= Oral traditions of the Soninke people =

The oral traditions of the Soninke people encompass narrative traditions such as oral history, epics, and folktales, along with non-narrative traditions such as proverbs, riddles, and songs. The oral history tradition continues to be upheld by gesere and jaare, who today maintain an important role in Soninke society even as literacy rates increase. The best known Soninke oral tradition in English is Gassire's Lute, although some have questioned its authenticity.

== Non-narrative oral traditions ==
=== Proverbs ===
Proverbs are an important part of the Soninke oral tradition, as in other oral traditions across the African continent. Here are a few proverbs in Soninke with French translations, and English translations of the French:

- "Maxa an kittidun ñexen wara ti an taadun ñexe." Ne lâche pas le poisson que tu tiens dans la main pour celui que tu as sous le pied. / Don't let go of the fish in your hand for the one under your foot.
- "Fare ga na an' danpu, an'xa ga na a danpu: xa su ña faru." Si un âne te donne une ruade et que tu la lui rends, vous devenez tous deux des ânes. / If a donkey kicks you and you kick him back, you both become donkeys.
- "Baanantara gana ti i ke da Alla wori, koxan katta a kutaana?" Si un solitaire soutient qu’il a vu Dieu, qui peut le contre-dire? (Se dit lorsqu’une personne semble parler en connaissance de cause.) / If a solitary maintains that he has seen God, who can contradict him? (Said when a person seems to speak with knowledge of the facts.)
- "Maxa an kitte ro yitten do i koromen naxa." Entre l’arbre et l’écorce, il ne faut point mettre le doigt. (Autrement dit, il ne faut jamais intervenir entre proches.) / Between the tree and the bark, one should not put one's finger. (In other words, one should never intervene between relatives.)
- "Kine gana yinbe ro angha, an ni bakka a da minne?" Si le crocodile te met le feu, comment te vengeras-tu? (C’est-à-dire, lorsqu’une personne beaucoup plus puissante que toi t’offense, tu ne peux en aucun cas te venger.) / If the crocodile sets you on fire, how will you take revenge? (That is to say, when a person much more powerful than you offends you, you cannot take revenge under any circumstances.)

For additional Soninke proverbs, see Soninkan Burujunu masalanu do taalinu by Oudiary Makan Dantioko, which contains 200 proverbs in Soninke with French translations; the author has published extensively on Soninke oral traditions. The SIL series of books documenting Soninke oral traditions includes a book of proverbs (in Soninke only): Taalin Kitaabe: Proverbes en langue soninkée.

=== Riddles ===
In her survey of oral literature in Africa, Ruth Finnegan emphasized the importance of riddles: "Riddles, however simple, involve a play of images, visual and acoustic, through which insights and comment can be expressed. In this way, even this very minor form of art, with its own stylistic peculiarities in different cultures, has its part to play in the richness of oral literature in African societies." These are some riddles in Soninke with French translations, and English translations of the French:

- "Yittitin gabe wa jiilagen na, na dari baane ga na yere jin di, a su bure. Ken ni mani yi? Ken ni yaaxayintun ya yi." "Il y a beaucoup d’arbres au bord de l’eau mais si une seule feuille tombe dans l’eau, ça fait mal. Que sont-ils? Ce sont les sourcils de l’œil. / There are many trees along the water but if only one leaf falls into the water, it hurts. What are they? These are the eyebrows of the eye." (#5)
- "Gunbulen tuurinten da fanŋen kara. Ken wure ni mani yi? Ken ni marafan ya yi, baawo nan toxo fanŋen falle, an ga n’a katu, a wa dangini." "Un taureau fou a traversé le fleuve. Cela veut dire quoi? C’est un fusil car quand tu tires en étant sur la rive d’un fleuve, la balle peut atteindre l’autre rive rapidement. / A mad bull crossed the river. What does that mean? It's a gun because when you shoot while being on the bank of a river, the ball can reach the other bank quickly." (#8)
- "N d’in sin wurundi n’a wurundi, n ma a taabatten wari. Ken wure ni mani yi? Ken wure ni futten ya yi." "J’ai fait courir mon cheval, je n’ai pas vu sa trace. Qu’est-ce que c’est? C’est une sueur. / I made my horse run, I did not see its track. What is this? It's sweat." (#27)

=== Songs ===
Songs also form part of the Soninke oral tradition. Moussa Diagana, a playwright and scholar born in 1946 in southern Mauritania, collected and studied the circumcision and marriage songs of the Soninke people in Kaédi, publishing the Soninke lyrics of the songs with French translations in Chants traditionnels du pays soninké. A reviewer praised the book for the fidelity of the French translations, concluding that "En sauvant de l'oubli un patrimoine menacé, il contribue à affirmer une identité culturelle pas toujours reconnue" ("By saving a threatened heritage from oblivion, it contributes to affirming a cultural identity not always recognized").

== Narrative oral traditions ==
=== Epics ===
==== History of recordation ====
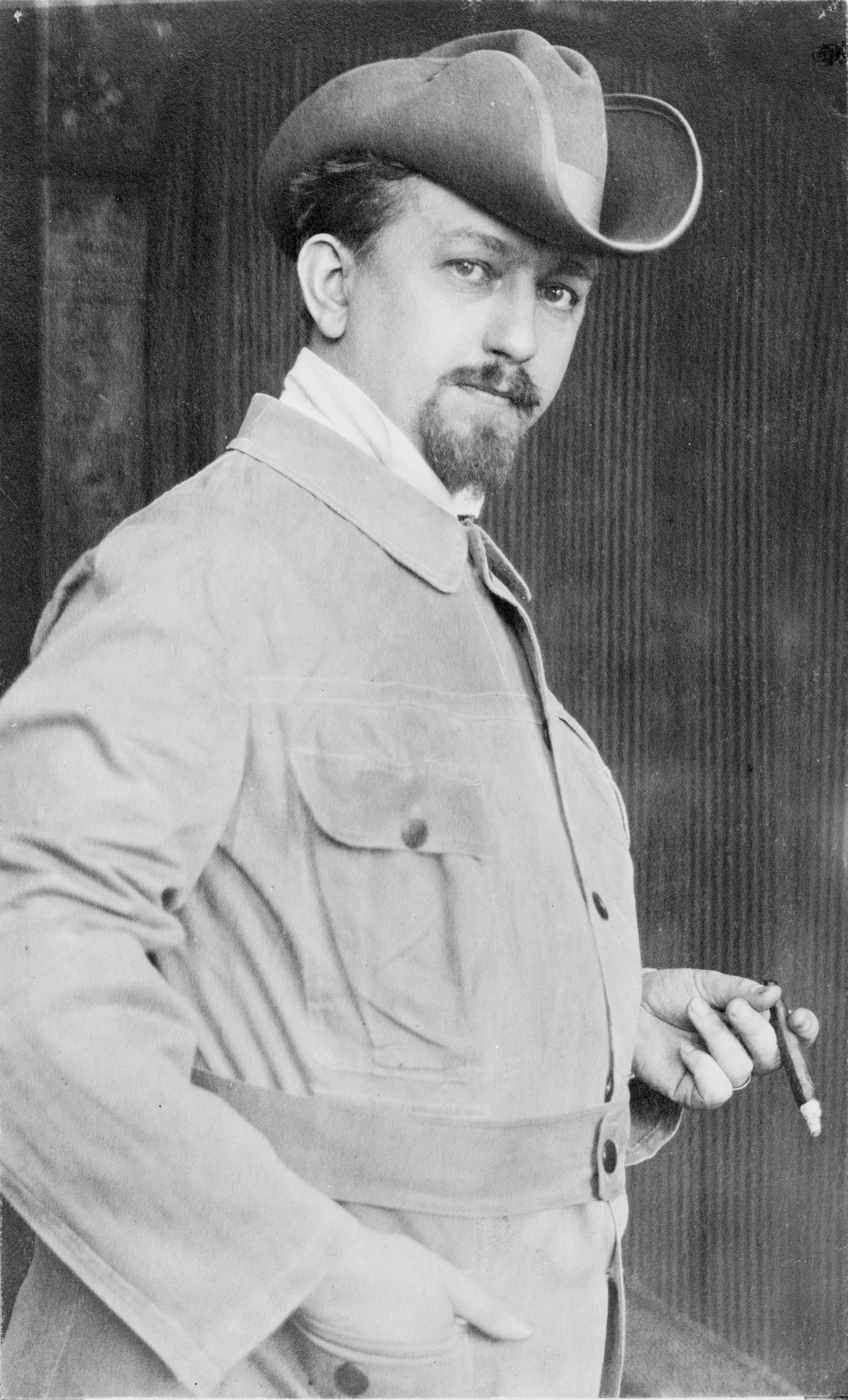
Leo Frobenius

In 1930, Leo Frobenius initiated his 12-volume series Atlantis: Folk Tales and Poetry of Africa, in which he published African Genesis (1936). The book contains the stories The Recovery of Wagadu and The Killing of the Bida Dragon, among others. A 1938 The Times review of the 1936 edition states that Frobenius's accounts of Gassire's lute and Samba Gana "can rank among the great folk tales of the world." At the same time, however, the reviewer cautions that the work was more for entertainment rather than rigorous anthropological study, mentioning that Frobenius never clarified whether the accounts were oral telling or translated manuscripts. Scholars continue to express doubts about the usefulness of Frobenius's contributions to the study of Soninke oral traditions: "He believed that he had uncovered a West African Heldenbuch, or book of heroes, but his sources, and indeed the language of his texts, are open to question." Belcher notes that Frobenius did not collect his Soninke stories in the Sahel but instead from a Soninke informant in Borgu, now northern Benin, and he recommends that Frobenius's materials are only of real value when they can be confirmed by independent sources such as modern recordings. When there is that confirmation, Frobenius can be regarded as providing evidence of an earlier version; without that corroboration, Frobenius's work is suspect. This is particularly true, Belcher observes, about Gassire's Lute, which Frobenius collected from an informant in Borgu and which, despite his best efforts, he was not able to find repeated in the Sahel.

In the 1930s, the Epic of Wagadu entered the European music scene via Wladimir Vogel's oratorio Wagadu Destroyed (1930), which is based on Frobenius's account. In 1935, it was translated into French by Hermann Scherchen and by May 1936 English by Nancy Bush. A performance conducted by Albert Coates and featuring soprano Laelia Finneberg, contralto Muriel Brunskill, baritone William Parsons, and chorus master Leslie Woodgate played on BBC Radio in May 1936. During the bombing of Berlin the original work was destroyed, but Vogel rewrote it using his notes, with it being revitalized in Lucerne, Switzerland on 4 September 1966 under Léonce Gras.

==== Origin myth ====
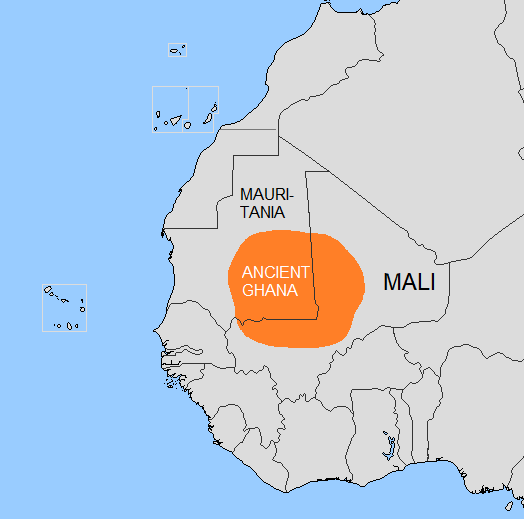
Territorial extent of the Ghana Empire (Wagadu)

The tradition of Wagadu (the native name for the Ghana Empire) is split into two parts, its foundation and its fall. They are thought to have been part of a much longer epic. According to griots, (Note: In Soninke society, the griot caste (nyaxamala) is divided into two groups: the jaare and gesere.) the Soninke trace their ancestry to Igo Khassé Dingka (big old man). Coming from the 'Land of Islam', (Note: Thought to be a later addition following the Soninke's conversion to Islam.) he journeyed to arrive in the modern-day territory of Mali, Mauritania, and Senegal, he conquered the Karos, an agricultural people. At this point, he and his soldiers had spears, swords, shields, and iron armor and were equestrians. To establish the Kingdom of Wagadu, Dingka negotiated with the seven-headed, black scaled, bat-winged, serpetine dragon Bida, who had ruled the area prior to his arrival. On the condition he submit the prettiest virgin to Bida every 7 years, he would receive gold and rain for agriculture. He then fathered children which would become the ancestors to the Soninke clans.

In some versions, Dinga arrives to region from the Middle East, and wins a battle of magic against a spirit-woman in order to gain access to a well. He bears three children who survive him: one half-human half-snake, and another two who contest over succession. The younger son, Djabe Cisse, is kind and of opposite character to his inconsiderate older brother but is exiled, however hears the message his father left with a vulture to go west to Koumbi. There he meets his half brother Bida living in a well, and they do a deal; every year Bida would receive a maiden and a horse, and in exchange Bida would rain gold over the land. In some versions Bida gave them four drums (copper, iron, silver, and gold). Only Djabe Cisse could lift the gold drum and so became king, establishing Wagadu.

By the founding of the Ghana Empire, the Soninke were a socio-politically and economically distinct ethnic group. By its collapse, which according to the oral history was caused by Bida's slaying, they were dispersed southwards throughout West Africa.

==== Rediscovery of Wagadu ====
Wagadu was lost for 7 years, but was found. However, she was then lost for 740 years. An old king named Mama Dinga stated she would return if war drum Tabele was beaten, but it had been tied to the sky by the djinns (devils). Mama Dinga still had a childhood bondsman, who was treated poorly by Mama Dinga's 6 eldest sons but kindly by the youngest, Lagarre. Mama Dinga was, due to age, blind to their treatment of the bondsman and could only distinguish his eldest son by his arm hair, arm ring, and the smell of his gown. One evening, he felt he was dying so he sent the bondsman to get his eldest son, but when he entered the son's house to speak with him he was kicked as he commonly was. Consequently, the bondsman sought Lagarre and asked if he could borrow the articles his father identified his eldest by. Lagarre then killed a goat to bear its rough and hairy hide on his arm, and borrowed his brother's gown and arm ring. Deceived, Mama Dinga spoke:

On the left bank of the stream stand four great Djalla trees. At the foot of these four trees lie nine jars. If you wash yourself in these nine jars and roll yourself in the dirt of the river bank you will always have plenty of followers. Wash yourself first in the first eight jars. And then in the ninth. Let the ninth go at first. But when you have washed yourself finally in this ninth jar, then you will be able to understand the language of the Djinns. Then you will know the language of all animals and also of the birds and will be able to speak with them. And then you can speak with the Djinns and ask them where the great Tabele, the great war drum is. The oldest Djinn will tell you, and when you have the great Tabele, then you will be able to find Wagadu again.

Lagarre left with soldiers and upon finding the jars followed his father's instructions. Meanwhile, at home the bondsman was compelled to admit his actions when the eldest son spoke with his father, explaining the sons' cruelty would lead him to destroy Wagadu and that he was ready for execution. Instead, the eldest son was told he would not be king soon and he rather should become a rainmaker so he would still have influence. Lagarre was pointed by the eldest Djinn to a forest containing Kuto, a being 7 years older than the Djinn. Kuto asked which people Lagarre belonged to, to which he replied he was the son of Dinga, and if he knew his paternal grandfather's name, which he did not, but Kuto revealed he did not know Dinga but rather it rather Kiridjo, Dinga's father. Kuto then directed Lagarre to Thurume, a jackal 17 years older than Kuto. Thurume revealed Lagarre's great-grandfather to be Kiridjotamani and directed him to Koliko, a buzzard 27 years older than Thurume. Koliko knew Kiridjotamani and the Tabele's location, but was too weak to fly from his branch. Accordingly, he had Lagarre slay a horse and donkey every morning for 7 days and feed him their hearts and livers in the night. After the 7 days the buzzard flew, but was too weak to break the thongs used to tie the Tabele. He demanded 3 more days of the routine, at the end of which he brought the Tabele. Per Koliko's instructions, Lagarre did not touch the Tabele for 2 days, but on the third beat it. That moment, he saw Wagadu reappear.

==== The Fight with the Bida Dragon ====
Koliko also told Lagarre that he would be confronted by the seven-headed serpentine dragon Bida. Lagarre's grandfather, (Note: In the story, he is referred to as Lagarre's "grandfather", but is the father of Kiridjotamani.) Wagana Sako, sacrificed ten maidens every year to him, but Koliko instructed Lagarre to refuse to do the same and instead bargain down to one. Bida was satisfied and expressed he would allow golden rain to fall over Wagadu three times a year.

Before, the four respected men of Wagadu were Wagana Sako, Dajabe Sise, Damangile (founder of the Djaora house from which the Soninke are descended), and Mamadi Sefe Dekote ("Sefe Dekote" means "he speaks seldom"). A jealous man, Sako had a doorless wall surround his court, which could only be entered by jumping the wall with the stallion Samba Ngarranja. He was fiercely guarded, as was his wife, by Sako, fearing his offspring would also be capable of jumping so high. Sako's uncle, Mamadi Sefe Dekote stole the stallion one night and bred a newly-bought mare. By age 3, the stallion could jump the wall. When Wagadu was at war and Sako away from home, Mamadi jumped the wall to speak and lay with Sako's wife. The same night, Sako returned to visit his wife. Noticing another stallion tied in the stables, Stako was apprehensive and eavesdropped on his wife and Mamadi's conversation. When a cat chasing a mouse frightened the couple, Mamadi admitted he was afraid of Sako. Consequently, Sako left for the frontlines. (Note: Frobenius and Fox (1937) clarify it was unchivalrous for Soninke to challenge men who admitted fear.) Mamadi left later and joined him by morning. Sako did not know the man was Mamadi, whom was unaware of Sako's eavesdropping, yet that evening they both played a lute and sang. First Sako, "Last night I heard a word and had I not heard it Wagadu would have been destroyed," and then Mamadi, "Had anyone heard what was said last night Wagadu would have been destroyed. But no one heard." After the people of Wagadu sang, "Let us return to Wagadu. For if, at the beginning of a campaign, people begin to quarrel then the matter can come to no good end," they returned home.

The people of Wagadu dictated the next firstborn, who was Sia Jatta Bari, would be sacrificed to Bida. Known for her beauty across Soninke society, (Note: Forbenius and Fox (1937) assert Soninke still invoked her name as a compliment.) Mamadi became her lover. However, one night she revealed to him the plans for her sacrifice. The next morning, Mamadi sharpened his sword and accompanied the procession to Bida's well next to the town. It was customary for Bida to show his head three times before eating the sacrifice, so as the people of Wagadu chanted Mamadi decapitated Bida on the third showing. The head then cursed Wagadu to never experience golden rain for the next 7 years, months, and days. Mamadi took Sia on his horse, heading to his mother's house in Sama-Markala, a town on the Niger River north of Segu; while the people closed in. The only horse that could catch Mamadi's was Samba Ngarranja. Accordingly, the people demanded Sako pursue Mamadi. Upon closing the gap, Sako threw his spear into the ground and explained he would not kill Mamadi since he was his uncle and that he should flee to his mother's. When the people caught up to Sako he claimed he missed and required their help to pull his spear from the ground. He repeated the charade twice. The fourth confrontation was outside Mamadi's mother's house. After Mamadi explained the situation, he was left there.

In Wagadu, Mamadi gave Sia mutukalle tamu in gold, (Note: Frobenius and Fox (1937) claim its estimated value was 1,000 francs.) but in Sama there was no gold-producing snake. As such, Sia had Mamadi cut off his little toe and finger for a purported headache. Afterward, she had a message delivered telling him she could not love someone with any less than ten toes and ten fingers. Mamadi fell into a rage so powerful he became deathly ill. He contracted an elderly woman to create a karté (tree butter) cake through Borri to smear on Sia's forehead. He then had the hairdresser Kumbadamba spread the karté on Sia's forehead. Thrice she went to Mamadi believing he called her and on the third time he told her to meet him at night. That night, Mamadi instead had his slave Blali sleep with her. In the morning, she was trembling having realized what transpired and that night went to her house and died from shame. Some versions end with the Soninke emigrating and dividing into three groups: "One went along the banks of the river/ One group headed toward the Sahel/ And the third left by the middle way."

===== Context and analysis =====
A wet period in the 3rd century CE in the Sahel is thought to have made certain areas newly habitable, and is thought to be when Wagadu was founded. Bida is stressed as a protective force by narrators; some versions have Bida descending from Dinga, with his children founding Wagadu. Pythons are most at home in grasslands near water, and likely came to be associated with the seasonal rains, with them rarely being seen during the dry periods. As such, snake deities feature prominently in West African traditional religions. Previous scholarship attributed Wagadu/Ghana's fall to Almoravid conquest, leading some to suggest the death of Bida symbolises the coming of Islam, however modern scholarship attributes it to a combination of climatic change and changing trade routes. The discovery of gold in Bure (mentioned in some versions) and growth of production there at the expense of Bambouk likely shifted trade epicentres south and east, weakening Ghana's core while strengthening their vassals, symbolised in some versions by Bida’s severed head falling in Bure. The gradual drying of the Sahel is said to have culminated in a 7 year long drought and famine; the generation of Soninke that survived the drought were called "it has been hard for them" ("a jara nununa") and given the family name Gumané. The mother of the noble who kills Bida could have been a woman of renown in Soninke society, and her inclusion a way of immortalising her. In Bambouk, gold was collected via alluvial deposits, so drought could have meant no new deposits.

==== Gassire's Lute ====
An excerpt that along with further lines appears both at the beginning and end:

"Four times Wagadu stood there in all her splendour. Four times Wagadu disappeared and was lost to human sight: once through vanity, once through greed, and once through dissension. Four times Wagadu changed her name. First she was called Dierra, then Agada, then Ganna, then Silla. Four times she turned her face. Once to the north, once to the west, once to the east and once to the south. For Wagadu, whenever men have seen her, has always had four gates: one to the north, one to the west, one to the east and one to the south. Those are the directions whence the strength of Wagadu comes, the strength in which she endures no matter whether she be built of stone, wood and earth or lives but as a shadow in the mind and longing of her children. For really, Wagadu is not of stone, not of wood, not of earth. Wagadu is the strength which lives in the hearts of men and is sometimes visible because eyes see her and ears hear the clash of swords and ring of shields, and is sometimes invisible because the indomitability of men has overtired her, so that she sleeps. Sleep came to Wagadu for the first time through vanity, for the second time through greed and for the fourth time through dissension. Should Wagadu ever be found for a fourth time, then she will live so forcefully in the minds of men that she will never be lost again, so forcefully that vanity, falsehood, greed and dissension will never be able to harm her. Hoooh! Dierra, Agada, Ganna, Silla! Hoooh! Fasa!"

Gassire is a prince of Wagadu and the future successor of his father, but his father, though old, just will not die and make way for his son. Gassire wants to be king very badly, and becomes a mighty warrior to demonstrate his strength. Gassire consults an old wise man who tells him that Gassire will abandon his quest to be king to play the lute. He also tells him that he will not be king and other people will become king after the death of his father, and the empire will fall. He hears the sound of the lute, and has one made for him because he loves the sound so much. When he tries to play the lute, it does not produce any sound. He hears that it can only be played if he goes into battle. He then hears that his sons must go to battle for the lute to play; in battle, seven of his sons die, but the lute will still not play. The people exiled him because of his violence and disregard for his family. He went into the desert with his one remaining son, his wives, and a few loyal friends. He finally can play the lute when he sings of the empire and the story provides lessons to all the people who listen.

===== Context and analysis =====
The epic is the only Soninke epic of Frobenius' collection that hasn't been corroborated, leading some to question its authenticity. It is reminiscent of Western Romanticism. The name Gassire is likely a variation on the Soninke word gesere, meaning griot, so the story is probably not a historical legend but instead an aetiological tale accounting for the word's origin. The four names given could refer to earlier settlements by the Soninke, possibly previous capitals of Wagadu/Ghana. Dierra could be Diarra, Agada Agadez, and Silla Silla. The Burdama warriors could refer to the Tuareg, and Boroma to the Fula.

==== Samba Gana ====
The beautiful and wise Annalja Tu Bari, the daughter of a prince who lived near Wagana, was highly sought as a bride; however, her demands were too high for every suitor. Once her father died of a bruised ego after losing a nearby village to another ruler, she inherited the town she lived in from him. Consequently, her demand for her hand in marriage was the reconquest of the village and 80 others. Years passed without a suitor and although she grew prettier, Annalja also grew melancholy each year; her knights, smiths, bards, and bondsmen could no longer laugh. In Faraka, the happy Samba Gana, son of Gana, defeated every prince in his region while accompanied by two bards, two servants, and his tutor Tararafe. He did not keep the towns of the defeated princes and after he heard of Annalja from Tararafe's singing while camped on the Niger River, he traveled days to meet her.

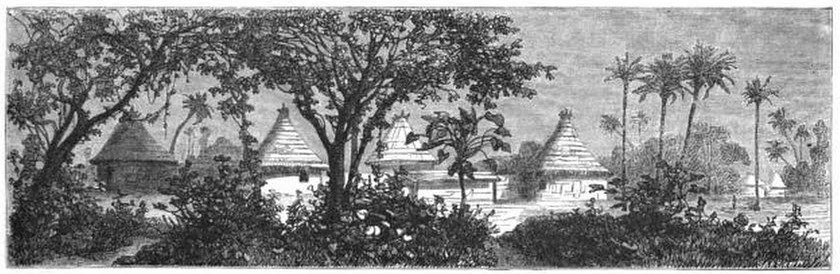
Soninke huts as depicted by Leon Jean-Baptiste Sabatier (1861)

Once pointed to the 80 towns, he left Tararafe with Annalja to make her laugh and went on to conquer each, sending the princes to inform Annalja of her ownership. Although when he returned she accepted him, he refused to marry until she laughed. Accordingly, Annalja directed him to the Issa Beer serpent, which Tararafe sang of, for it caused hunger, which prevented her laughter. He traveled through Koriume and Bamba before finding the serpent. He subsequently battled it for 8 years, breaking 800 lances and 80 swords while the Niger shifted and mountains gave way to chasms. Left with a blood-stained sword and lance, he gave the latter to Tararafe to "see if she laughs now". When Tararafe returned with her demand that he bring the serpent to her as a slave to "lead the river into my country", he declared "she asks too much" and impaled his breast with the sword. Tararafe drew and presented it to Annalja, stating it had combatants' blood and that Gana had his last laugh.

Summoning all princes and knights in her town, she rode to Gana's corpse. There she promulgated: "This hero was greater than all before him. Build him a tomb to tower over that of every hero and of every king." 8 times 800 people built his "tumulus-like pyramid" tomb outfitted with underground burial and ground-level sacrificial chambers. For 8 years Gana was commemorated everyday in song until his tomb reached high enough to see Wagana. One sunrise, Tararafe told Annalja he could see Wagana. She concurred and exclaimed the tomb was "as great as his name deserves". She laughed twice before sending the knights and 8 times 800 princes out to "become heroes like Samna Gana". After laughing once more, she died and was buried with Gana.

==== The Messenger to Maftam ====
An old man named Mamedi, who had a reputation for never lying, lived in Ogo. One day, Soninke chief Bahene had a discussion about him, which concluded with Bahene irritated that the man was an exaggeration and demanded Mamedi be brought to him. After Mamedi affirmed regardless of the circumstances he cannot lie, Bahene declared he would have Mamedi beaten if he was ever caught lying, expressing afterward to his councilors that Mamedi was arrogant and needed a lesson. Several days later, Bahene sent for Mamedi in the morning, asking him to tell his wife in Maftam that he and his hunting party would be there at noon and to prepare a large dinner. Pretending to begin while Mamedi ran away, Bahene and his party returned to his house and he revealed it was a rouse to make Mamedi lie and that they would beat him in the next morning. Once Mamedi arrived, he told Bahene's wife "It is likely, rather, or so it seemed, perhaps, possibly, or, on the other hand more or less certainly, probably less than more, or more than less, that Bahene went hunting." Having answered her subsequent questions the same way, she ended the conversation in frustration and Mamedi spent the night. The next morning, after Bahene's wife told him what occurred, he affirmed Mamedi could not lie, to which Mamedi agreed in the same manner he spoke to Bahene's wife.

==== Dama Ngile and the Kingdom of Diarra ====
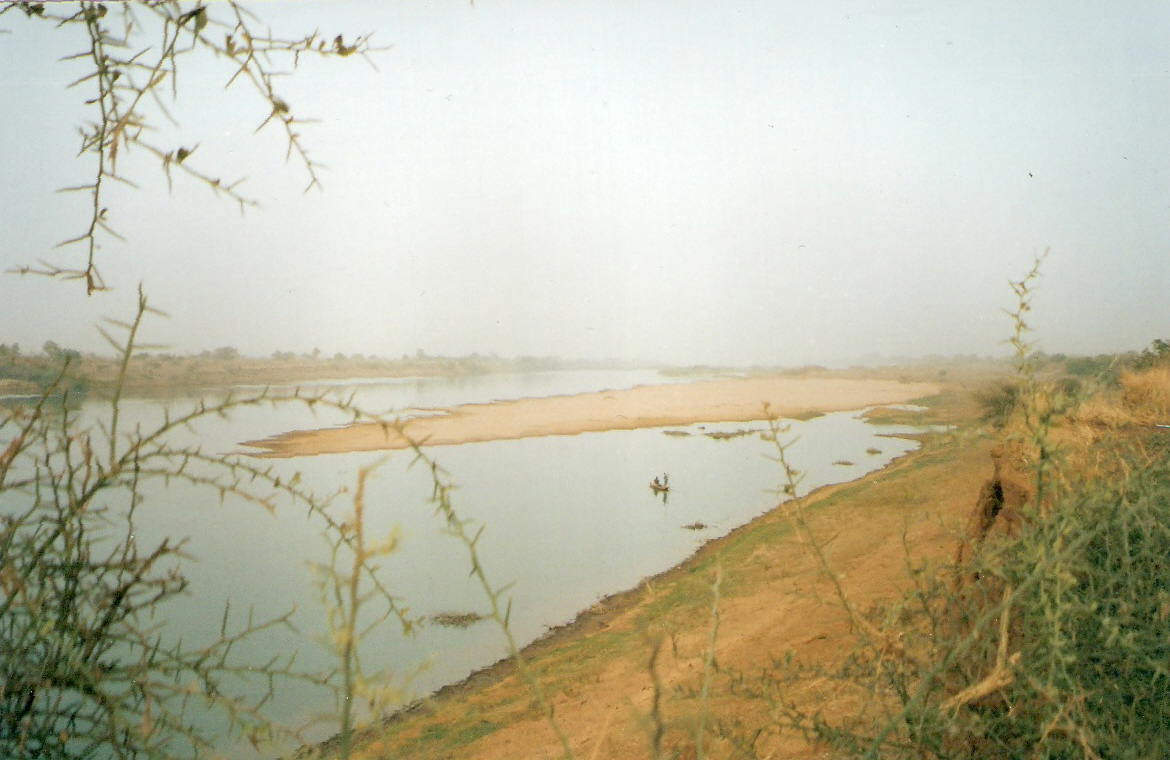
The Senegal River in the West African hinterlands (2002)

Dama Ngile hunted elephants and lived in the hinterlands, with a tanner being his only contact with humans. He met and entertained a Muslim holy man endeavouring on hajj however the holy man left behind his purse of gold. Dama Ngile caught up to the man and returned it; the holy man inquired about what he could give in reward. Dama Ngile asked for a blade able to decapitate elephants and buffaloes.

The holy man was about to return from Mecca when a greater holy man's question reminded him of Dama Ngile. He asked for a sword. The blade shone and represented royalty. He brought the blade back to Manden and left it with Sundiata, the ruler of Mali, to give to Dama Ngile. Sundiata wished to keep it. Eventually Dama Ngile came to ask for his blade. Sundiata had another one made, however each time his servant went to give Dama Ngile the fake one, the real one appeared in his hand. Sundiata accepted the inevitable and ordered Dama Ngile to leave the kingdom.

Dama Ngile wandered and fathered a son, Fie Mamadou. Fie Mamadou came to the Kingdom of Diarra, ruled by the Niakhate dynasty. He overthrew the tyrannical rulers using magic and established the Diawara dynasty. The migrations of the Fulbe, led by Koli Tenguella, are mentioned towards the end of the story.

===== Context and analysis =====
The Kingdom of Diarra was a kingdom centred on the city of Diarra, Mali, and experienced periods of independence and vassalage. The story uses the regional building blocks of foundation legends. The Diawara dynasty is legitimised in three ways by being recognised by Sundiata, being blessed by Islam, and having moral superiority over their predecessors.

==== The dispersal of the Kusa ====
Garaghe Makhan ruled the Kusa. His rule was tyrannical, and contrasted with a neighbouring leader, Touma Damba, who was very generous. (Note: Touma Damba, when listing his gifts, says "This world will come, it will pass. Other worlds will come after, worlds of confusion and strife.") Maren Jagu was born and disguised as a girl after Garaghe Makhan had killed his father, Bincigi, a Kusa leader. Maren Jagu grew up fast and even came into conflict with the tyrant. (Note: Garaghe predicts: "What you hear today will bring trouble tomorrow. For tomorrow, when trouble appears, the sons of the Kusa will prefer death to life.")

He left to learn skills of the mystical and supernatural (in some versions stress is placed on Maren Jagu learning magical knowledge of Islam), murdering each teacher he had until he met Dinga, who avoided the same treatment and taught him. Having sworn to sacrifice the first thing he met on his return home, he encountered his sister, Haintainkourabe. She had to pierce her wrap-around cloth with an awl before he could kill her. He sacrificed her, however found her alive on his return home. Together they deposed Garaghe Makhan, however Maren Jagu proved to rule in the same fashion, and after some time the Kusa left him and dispersed.

===== Context and analysis =====
The Kusa are a Soninke group from the Nioro and Jara regions of Mali. Dinga is the founder of Wagadu. The tradition espouses a pessimistic worldview. It possibly alludes to the recent political history of the region in that Maren Jagu becomes too easily what he overthrew.

=== Folktales ===
==== Animal tales ====
The hyena and the hare are important characters in the Soninke animal tale tradition. The SIL series of books documenting Soninke oral traditions includes a collection of Soninke tales with French translations: Dangamaanu: Les contes soninké, which features 10 animal tales, most of them about the hare and/or the hyena. Here are two examples:

- In "Tangira," or "La Partie de Pêche / The Fishing Trip," the hare and the hyena go fishing together. When they catch one fish only, the hare tells the hyena to choose: the one fish now, or the two fish they might catch the next day. The hyena eagerly asks for two fish the next day. But the next day they don't catch any fish, and the hyena goes hungry again.
- In "Yellisagaraye," or "A la Recherche des Oeufs / In Search of Eggs," the hare and the hyena gather chicken eggs into their bags. Then when the hare wants to walk in front, the hyena protests: "I'm oldest; I'll walk in front." The hare then cuts a hole in the hyena's bag and gathers the eggs as they fall out. When they reach home, the hyena cries, "My bag has eaten the eggs," and the hare replies, "My bag has laid more eggs."

Stories about the hyena and the hare can also be found in Fernand Daniel's 10 Soninke tales (published in French translation only). For example, the story of "Le Lion, l’Hyéne et le Liévre / The Lion, The Hyena, and the Hare," is a version of the lion's share folktale type, which is well documented in Africa. In this Soninke version, the lion, hyena, and hare go hunting, and when the lion tells the hyena to divide the spoils, the hyena gives the biggest portion to the lion, the middle portion to himself, and the smallest portion to the hare; enraged, the lion kills the hyena. He then tells the hare to divide the spoils, and the hare gives it all to the lion. "How did you learn to do this?" asks the lion; "From the hyena," says the hare.

Charles Monteil's Soudan français. Contes soudanais contains a French translation of a Soninke hyena story: "Le Lion, La Panthère et L'Hyène / The Lion, the Panther, and the Hyena." The lion, panther, and hyena debate who is most capable. The lion boasts of his strength, the panther of his agility, while the hyena claims to be both strong and agile and also cunning. The hyena then proposes that try to steal a dog that is sleeping by a fire in the village where people have gathered to tell stories. The lion tries and gives up, saying it's impossible to steal the dog while the people are there around the fire; the panther also fails. The hyena then creeps up to the fire, hiding in the shadows cast by the people; next, the hyena jumps into the fire, scattering the burning firebrands onto the people's clothes. While the people are distracted, the hyena snatches the dog and runs off, winning the contest.

For a study of the significance of tales about the hyena for Soninke society, see Fadiga Samba's Littérature orale soninke: le conte.

==== Tales of people ====
Most of the Soninke folktales in Monteil's Soudan français. Contes soudanais are stories about people. The 8 stories appear in French translation; one of those stories, "Samba le Lache," can be found in English in Andrew Lang's Olive Fairy Book as "Samba the Coward." Samba is born a prince, but he's a coward, and when the people mock his cowardice, he runs away. The princess of a neighboring kingdom falls in love with him, and they marry. She hopes he'll be brave in battle, but he tells her that he's afraid; when the time for battle arrives, he hides in the cellar. His wife finds him there, takes his armor, and rides into battle, disguised as her husband. She triumphs, and everyone cheers "Samba" as a hero. The princess's brother, however, is suspicious. In the next battle, the prince wounds "Samba" in the leg. The princess returns home and tells Samba to wound himself in the same way; he refuses, so she wounds him and summons a physician, but her brother is still suspicious. In the third battle, the princess's wound prevents her from fighting; she tells Samba he must fight now. She prods his horse so that it charges into battle, and Samba has no choice but to fight. He turns out to be a good fighter, defeating the enemy. When the king praises him, Samba responds that the praise should be for the princess who turned him into a brave man.

== Sources ==
=== Bibliography ===
- Bathily, Abdoulaya (1975). "Discussion of the Traditions of Wagadu with Some Reference to Ancient Ghana". Bulletin de l'Institut fondamental d'Afrique noire. 37 (1): 1–49. ISSN 0018-9642.
- Belcher, Stephen (22 October 1999). Epic Traditions of Africa. Bloomington: Indiana University Press. ISBN 978-0-253-21281-8.
- Conrad, David C.; Fisher, Humphrey J. (1983). "The Conquest That Never Was: Ghana and the Almoravids, 1076. II. The Local Oral Sources". History in Africa. 10. Cambridge: Cambridge University Press: 53–78. doi:10.2307/3171690. ISSN 1558-2744. JSTOR 3171690. S2CID 162867483.
- Courlander, Harold (1975). A Treasury of African Folklore: The Oral Literature, Traditions, Myths, Legends, Epics, Tales, Recollections, Wisdom, Sayings and Humor of Africa (1 ed.). New York City: Crown Publishers. ISBN 9780517516706. OCLC 1204348. Oral traditions of the Soninke people at the Internet Archive.
- Frobenius, Leo; Fox, Douglas C. (1937). African Genesis: Folk Tales and Myths of Africa. New York City: Stackpole Sons. OCLC 41531781.
- Jablow, Alta (1984). "Gassire's Lute: A Reconstruction of Soninke Bardic Art". Research in African Literatures. 15 (4). Indianapolis: Indiana University Press: 519–529. ISSN 0034-5210. JSTOR 3819348. S2CID 162759007.
- Johnson, John William; Hale, Thomas A.; Belcher, Stephen, eds. (1 March 1997). Oral Epics from Africa: Vibrant Voices from a Vast Continent. Indiana University Press. ISBN 978-025-333257-8.
- Scheub, Harold (2000). A Dictionary of African Mythology: The Mythmaker as Storyteller. Oxford University Press. ISBN 0-19-512456-1.
