= History of the Soninke people =

The Soninke people are a West African ethnic group that is spread widely over the Sahel region. Their history, as recorded in oral traditions, medieval Arab writings, and modern archaeological and linguistic studies, extends into the first millennium BCE. The Soninke were the founders and rulers of the Ghana Empire, also known as Wagadou, as well as several smaller states such as Gajaaga, Guidimakha, and Kaarta.

== Origins ==
=== Legends ===
The first ruler of this empire was said by Sonnike Griots to be the semi-divine Dingha Cisse. He was sometimes said to have come with his people from "the East", Aswan, Egypt or Mali, and created a coalition against the neighboring tribes and “nomadic raiders”. In order to take power he had to kill a goblin, and then marry his daughters, who became the ancestors of the clans that were dominant in the region at the time. Upon Dinga's death, his two sons Khine and Dyabe contested the kingship. Dyabe, humiliated, made an accord with Bida, the giant, black, bat-winged serpent or dragon with seven heads. He promised to sacrifice a virgin to the snake once every year in return for victory over his brother. He fulfilled his promise to Bida until his death.

=== Archaeological Findings ===
In 1969 Patrick Munson excavated at Dhar Tichitt (a site associated with the ancestors of the Soninke), which clearly reflected a complex culture that was present by 1600 BC and had architectural and material cultural elements similar to those found at Koumbi Saleh in the 1920s. The earliest proto-polity ancestral to Ghana likely arose from a large collection of ancient proto-Mande agro-pastoralist chiefdoms that were spread over the western-most portion of the Niger River basin for over a millennium roughly spanning 1300 BCE – 300 BCE. Munson theorized that, around 700 BCE Libyco-Berbers raiders destroyed this burgeoning state. The opening of this route across the desert, however, eventually changed the economic calculus from raiding to trade, and the native Soninke reasserted themselves around 300 BCE. Saharan trade and the arrival of ironworking technology were crucial in the development of the state. Work in Dhar Tichitt, Dhar Nema and Dhar Walata has shown that, as the desert advanced, the local groups moved southward into the still well-watered areas of what is now northern Mali.

== Ghana Empire ==
The Ghana Empire, also known by the Soninke name of Wagadou, thrived from approximately 300CE to 1100CE. Control over the trade routes transporting gold, silver copper and other products, such as salt, textiles, beads, and finished goods, made the empire rich. Eventually Islam became widely adopted. The rising power of the Almoravids and debilitating droughts caused the imperial core to weaken at the expense of former vassal states in the 12th century.

=== Oral Legend of the Fall of Wagadu ===
For the Soninke people, the decline of their empire was due to the legend of Wagadu and the rupture of the pact between the empire and the black snake. This happened after the nobles chose Siya Yatabare as the annual sacrifice. She was the most beautiful and “cleanest” virgin girl in that year, but she was also engaged to be married. Her fiancé, Maadi, was the son of Djamere Soukhounou whose unique quality was that he always did what he promised. When Maadi was told him what would happen, that his fiancée would be given to “Bida” - the black serpetine dragon of Wagadu, he promised Siya that she would not die in the well of Wagadu.

Siya tried to convince him that it is her destiny, that he should let her to be the gift to the snake in order to save the Empire, but Maadi refused. Within days, he asked his friend, the blacksmith of his village named Bomou, to sharpen his saber. When the day came, Maadi set on his way in the direction of the well of Wagadu. Siya Yatabare was well dressed and her hairstyle was in plaited with gold. The praise-singer encouraged her, as did her family. When they left, she saw Maadi and they both fell in tears. Siya told him that if he killed the snake, Wagadu would not have any more rain and the empire would be destroyed forever. Maadi refused, saying their destinies are ratified. He left her and hid himself nearby to wait for the snake.

The snake of Wagadu had seven heads. When the snake took out his first head, Maadi cut it. He did the same to all the others. When the snake took out his last head, the one in silver, the night became clear like the day. The snake said, “I swear by the lord of seven head, during seven years and seven bad years, and during seven months and seven bad months, during seven days and seven bad days, Wagadu will not receive any rain and any piece of gold”. Maadi did not mind, and cut the last head. The snake died. Maadi gave to Siya his shoes, the sheath of his saber, his ring, his “danan koufoune” cap. He told her that, if tomorrow they ask you some clarifications, give them those things. Maadi went to his village and told all the details to his mother. She said “you are my only son and it is because of your fiancée that you killed the “Bida”, however, the nobles of Wagadu will try to punish you. I swear in the memory of your father that I will do everything to protect you from Wagadu.”

When the sun came up, the nobles asked the praise-singer to go check the well of Wagadu. When they saw Siya, and the heads of the snake in the well, they asked her what happened. As an answer, she gave them the shoes and all the things that Maadi gave her. The nobles of the 99 villages called everybody to come and try to wear the articles of clothing. When Maadi wore the shoes, the bonnet and the ring, everything fit. People knew that he killed the snake. They were going to take him when his mother intervened and said: “I thought there were men in Wagadu, but I do not see any. You are afraid of the prediction of the snake even before you die. But there is something sure, nobody will kill my son because of a snake. I do not see any men here. You will know that my loincloth is better than all your trousers accumulated here. During those seven bad years and seven bad months and seven bad days, the needs of wagadu would be in my charge as an exchange of my son’s life and his marriage with Siya Yatabare.”

With shame, the notables of Wagadu concluded the agreement. After Djamere Shoukhouna died, the nobles of Wagadu met and decided that she did what she promised and the agreement was at end and the destiny of the nation would be accomplished. Wagadu went from fertile to dry, and there was no more rain. The children of Dingha, the Soninke, were forced to leave that place which became inhospitable. Thus every family went to their destiny.

== Soninke Diaspora ==
After the fall of Wagadou, the Soninke dispersed throughout West Africa searching for more hospitable terrain. They merged with various ethnicities that they met, creating the Marka people, the Yarse, the Diakhanke and others. Some even made it as far as the lands of the Akan people in modern-day Ghana, and to what is now northern Nigeria. The Soninke successor kingdoms of Gajaaga and Kaarta survived, however. The Soninke diaspora has played an important role in the history of many polities in West Africa ever since.

== See also ==
- Ghana Empire
- Kaya Magan Cissé
