= Kaniaga =

Region located in West Africa

Kaniaga is a historical region in western Mali and southern Mauritania between the upper Senegal River and the Niger bend, derived from a Malinke term which means 'north'. Defined broadly, it includes all the Soninke-inhabited lands, including Wagadou, Bakhounou, Kingui, Guidioume, Diafounou, Guidimakha and Gajaaga.

Depending on the historical period being discussed, the term can be used in various different ways. In chronological order, it can refer to the Sosso Empire, a province of the Mali Empire, the semi-independent Kingdom of Diarra, a province between Wagadou proper and Beledougou, or to the western part of Khasso.

Kingui is the Pulaar term for the region.
