= Diabe Cissé =

First ruler of Wagadou

- Kaya Maghan, Ghana
- Predecessor: Dinga
- Dynasty: Cisse dynasty
- Father: Dinga
- Mother: Katana Boro

Diabe Cissé was the possibly legendary first ruler of the Soninke empire of Wagadou, also known as the Ghana Empire.

According to legend, he tricked his dying father into giving him the birthright of his elder brother Xiine Sukuna in a manner similar to the biblical story of Jacob and Esau. He fled into the bush, where he received a magic drum and was led to a place called Kumbi. There he concluded a pact with Bida the python god to sacrifice a virgin every year in exchange for plentiful rains and gold.
