= Gassire's Lute =

Epic of the Soninke people

Gassire's Lute is an epic by the Soninke people of West Africa. It was collected by Leo Frobenius and published in 1921. An English prose translation was made by Douglas Fox, published in African Genesis (first printed 1937).

This lyrical epic narrative tells the story of a prince who gives up his ambition to become king, and instead becomes a diari, the Soninke equivalent to a griot, a bard/singer. While the story has enchanted readers since it first appeared, it should be approached with caution. Frobenius attributes it to the Soninke people of West Africa, the people associated with the Empire of Wagadu or Ghana. The name Gassire is likely a variation on the Soninke word gesere, meaning griot, so the story is probably not a historical legend but instead an aetiological tale accounting for the word's origin. This is the only Soninke epic included by Frobenius that hasn't been corroborated, leading some to question its authenticity.

== Summary ==
Gassire is a prince of Wagadu and the future successor of his father, but his father, though old, just will not die and make way for his son. Gassire wants to be king very badly, and becomes a mighty warrior to demonstrate his strength. Gassire consults an old wise man who tells him that Gassire will abandon his quest to be king to play the lute. He also tells him that he will not be king and other people will become king after the death of his father, and the empire will fall. He hears the sound of the lute, and has one made for him because he loves the sound so much. When he tries to play the lute, it does not produce any sound. He hears that it can only be played if he goes into battle. He then hears that his sons must go to battle for the lute to play; in battle, seven of his sons die, but the lute will still not play. The people exiled him because of his violence and disregard for his family. He went into the desert with his one remaining son, his wives, and a few loyal friends. He finally can play the lute when he sings of the empire and the story provides lessons to all the people who listen.

== Analysis ==
The epic is reminiscent of Western Romanticism. The four names given are thought to refer to earlier settlements by the Soninke, possibly previous capitals of Wagadu/Ghana. Dierra could be Diarra, Agada Agadez, and Silla Silla. The Burdama warriors could refer to the Tuareg, and Boroma to the Fula.

== Manuscript and editions ==
The poem was collected by Leo Frobenius in 1909, who published a prose translation of the poem in his collection Speilmanns-Geschichten der Sahel (vol. 6, 1921). Frobenius regarded the poem as a fragment from a much longer epic tradition, a view maintained also by Alta Jablow, a scholar who presented a paper on the poem in 1978, which was subsequently published in the journal Research in African Literatures. Jablow published an English translation of Frobenius's original in 1971, illustrated by Leo and Diane Dillon, and with a six-page glossary. That edition was republished in 1991 by Waveland Press, with the 1978 essay included.

Regarding Jablow's unquestioning adoption of Frobenius's work, Stephen Belcher observes: "Alta Jablow has erected a vision of Soninke epic art on the basis of this one narrative, perpetuating the romantic vision that inebriated Frobenius himself, but she has done so without consideration of the related historical and ethnographic material."

The story was set to music by Wladimir Vogel as Wagadus Untergang durch die Eitelkeit (1930, reconstructed in 1948).
