= Tenkamenin =

Tenkamenin may refer to:

- Tha Realest (rapper)
- Tunka Manin, ancient king of Ghana
