= Ghana Bassi =

Ruler of the Ghana Empire from 1040 to 1062

Bassi
- Kaya Maghan, Ghana
- Successor: Manin
- Died: 1063
- Issue: Qanmar
- Dynasty: Cisse dynasty

Bassi was the ghana (king) of Wagadu, also known as the Ghana Empire, in the middle of the 11th century, during a time of conflict with the Almoravids. His existence is attested only in the writings of al-Bakri.

According to al-Bakri, Bassi became king at the age of 85. He was a righteous ruler who was friendly to Muslims. Towards the end of his life he became blind, but concealed this disability from his subjects and relied heavily on advisors.

In 1056, the Almoravids sacked the important commercial city of Awdaghost, targeting it due to the inhabitants' loyalty to Ghana.

Upon his death in 1063, Bassi was succeeded by Manin, the son of his sister, in accordance with matrilineal custom. Bassi may have been the father of Qanmar, the king of the vassal kingdom of Alukan (or Alwakan) and a secret Muslim. Some historians have speculated that Qanmar was passed over for the royal succession due to his Muslim faith, as Basi attempted to strengthen internal resistance to the Almoravids' Islamic pressure. This in turn may have provided an opportunity for Almoravid intervention supporting pro-Islam candidates for the throne.
