= Gajaaga =

Kingdom in West Africa

Kingdom of Gajaaga Gajaaga
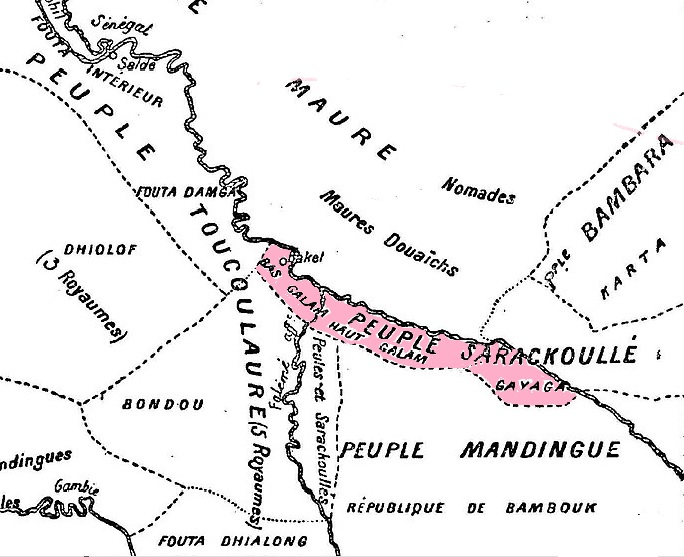
- Location in pink of Kingdom of Galam
- Location: Modern day Senegal
- Capital: Makhana Tuyaabu
- Common languages: Soninke language
- Religion: Traditional African Religion, syncretic Islam
- Government: Monarchy
- Tunka
- History
  - Bacili dynasty founded: before 1000CE
  - Annexed by the French Colonial Empire: 1858
- Currency: cloth, silver, gold
Preceded by	Succeeded by
Ghana Empire	French conquest of Senegal

Gajaaga, also known as Galam, was a Soninke kingdom on the upper Senegal River in West Africa that existed from before 1000 CE to 1858. The kingdom was mainly located in present-day Senegal and some parts of Mali. It was sometimes referred to as the Land of Gold, which it exported in large quantities, and 'Galam' in fact means "gold" in Wolof. In the middle of the 17th century, Gajaaga was perhaps the most powerful state in the upper Senegal River region. It controlled both banks of the river from the area of Kayes downstream to Bakel.

== History ==
The Bacili dynasty established a successor state to the Ghana Empire, preserving the traditional snake cult of Wagadu. They came to the region from the Inner Niger Delta sometime between the 8th and 11th centuries CE and conquered the native 'Gaja' Soninke people, but their control was only truly cemented in the 13th century. At some point Gajaaga became a tributary of the Mali Empire, remaining so until 1506, when Songhai attacks broke Malian power in the Sahel.

With the rise of the Deniankes in Futa Toro, Gajaaga became a nominal tributary state in the late 16th century.

In 1690, Fula Torodbe cleric Malick Sy came to Gajaaga seeking a place to practice his interpretation of sharia. The tunka gave him control over a town and eventually the entire sparsely populated area of Bundu. In the 18th century, however, Bundu's power increased as they captured land from their former overlords, and Gajaaga declined. Gajaaga also lost land to the kingdoms of Khasso and Guidimakha. At the beginning of the 18th century, they suffered raids by the Trarza Moors and Kaarta.

The French built a fort in Gajaaga in 1700, from which came most of the slaves traded out of Saint-Louis in the decades following. The penetration of the slave trade and the rising influence of Moroccan Orman forces in the Senegal River valley created widespread social upheaval that affected Gajaaga as much as its neighbors. Beginning in 1700 the kingdom saw frequent succession disputes and civil wars, destroying the confederation's internal unity. These culminated in a 1750 invasion by Kaarta and Khasso which, though defeated, signaled Gajaaga's weakness.

After a long absence during the French Revolution and Napoleonic Wars, the French re-established a fort at Bakel in 1820 and gave a monopoly on river trade to the 'Companie de Galam' in 1824, all to try and divert trade away from the British posts along the Gambia River. While remaining nominally neutral in local conflicts, the French pressured rulers by increasing or decreasing custom payments and gifts, creating rivalries between factions and villages. The two tunka of Gooy and Kamera competed for the Gajaaga throne from 1833 to 1841 with the French playing a prominent role as they tried to weaken the powerful state of Kaarta. In 1844 the French signed separate treaties with the leaders of the two provinces Gooy and Kamera, recognizing their de facto separation.

The 1848 abolition of the Companie's monopoly led to an explosion of new trading posts and even more conflicts between local leaders for control of the trade and resulting customs revenue, which the French "cannonade politics" did little to assuage. Merchants in Saint-Louis increasingly demanded conquest as a way to establish order. The threat of El Hadj Omar Saidou Tall gave French governor Louis Faidherbe the excuse he needed to do as they requested. In 1855 he annexed Bakel and Medine, where he built another fort. Tall's 1857 failure to capture this fort confirmed French power in the region. In 1858 they annexed half of Gooy and made the rest a protectorate, bringing an end to a millennium of Bacilli rule in Gajaaga.

== Government and society ==
The core of the state was two provinces, Gooy and Kamera, with their capitals at Tiyabu and Makhaana respectively. Each was led by a tunka, the oldest of whom ruled the entire kingdom. The tunka was commander-in-chief of the army and administrator of justice and had the right to tax the population, although villages retained considerable autonomy at least until the arrival of Europeans. The ruling class or dambe were supported by sakko griots who memorized and recited their illustrious lineage.

Gajaaga society was marked by a complex series of hierarchies. One involved nobles, freemen, and slaves; another cleavages distinguished between natives and strangers, Muslims and animists, job groups, or degree of servitude and status of the master or patron in question. Some slaves were allowed to maintain their names and inheritance over generations; others were chattel tasked with domestic work; others were destined for the slave trade. Different social groups lived in designated villages. The most prominent were the animist warrior aristocracy and the marabouts, with each family among the latter linked in a patronage relationship to one among the former.

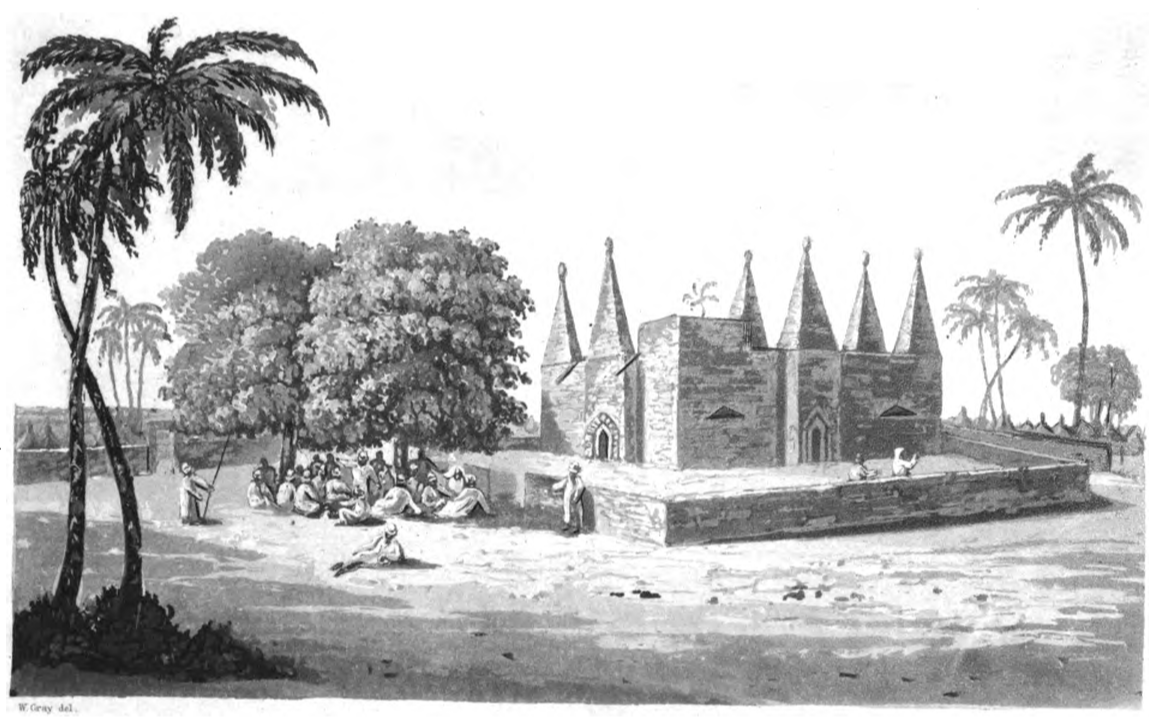
The mosque and public square of Dramane in Upper Gajaaga in 1820

Over time the economic and social disruptions created by European penetration and the slave trade led to near-constant warfare, much of it civil. The aristocracy's monopoly on guns led to increased oppression for the lower classes and a winner-take-all attitude in succession disputes. The decline of the slave trade in the early 19th century took away Gajaaga's most important export, further weakening the state and paving the way for formal colonization.

== Economy ==
Gajaaga was a riverine state, and much of the economy rested on a dual agricultural system where one crop was planted in the uplands during the rainy season, while another was grown in the floodplain as the Senegal River's annual flood tapered off during the dry season. This gave the inhabitants insurance against inconsistent rains. The ruling class, marabouts, and well-off free men had slaves to work their fields.

By the 17th century Gajaaga was the center of an extensive Soninke trading diaspora linking it with Diarra and Timbuktu to the east, southeast to Segou, and south to Tanda and Wuli on the upper Gambia River. Marabout jula families traded ivory, slaves, gold, and cloth woven by slaves that also functioned as currency.

Gajaaga in the 18th century was one of the states most connected to European commerce. Every year when the water rose trading ships would leave Saint-Louis at the mouth of the river, arriving in Gajaaga around September. The trading season lasted a few months, at which point the merchants would return downriver and the local jula would begin stocking and preparing for the next year. Slaves, captives from the wars of the Bamana Empire and the Imamate of Fula Djallon or locals captured by raiders from the Sahara, were the most important trade item. Gajaaga provided most of the slaves shipped out of Saint-Louis, as well as many of the slaves sold to the British along the Gambia River.

During the 17th and early 18th centuries European competition and the insecurity created by constant slave-raiding and warfare gradually strangled the domestic cloth manufacturing and ironworking industries, but a domestic gunpowder industry arose in its place.

== Sources ==
- Bathily, Abdoulaye (1986). "La Traite Atlantique des Esclaves et ses Effets Économiques et Sociaux en Afrique: La Cas du Galam, Royaume de l'Hinterland Sénégambien au Dix-Huitième Siècle". Journal of African History. 27 (2): 260–293. doi:10.1017/S0021853700036677. JSTOR 181136. S2CID 162342876.
- Barry, Boubacar (1998). Senegambia and the Atlantic slave trade. Cambridge, UK: Cambridge University Press.
- Curtin, Philip D. (1975). "The uses of oral tradition in Senegambia : Maalik Sii and the foundation of Bundu". Cahiers d'études africaines. 15 (58): 189–202. doi:10.3406/cea.1975.2592. JSTOR 4391387.
- Chastanet, Monique (October 1987). "De la traite à la conquête coloniale dans le Haut Sénégal : l'état Soninke du Gajaaga de 1818 à 1858" (PDF). Cahiers du C.R.A. 5: 87–108.
- Gomez, Michael (2002). Pragmatism in the Age of Jihad: The Precolonial State of Bundu (2nd ed.). UK: Cambridge University Press. ISBN 9780521528474.
- Green, Toby (2020). A Fistful of Shells. UK: Penguin Books.
