= Charles Monteil =

French civil servant

- Born: 22 February 1871; Paris, France
- Died: 20 April 1949 (aged 78); Tulle, Corrèze, France
- Occupations: Civil servant, ethnologist

Charles Monteil (22 February 1871 – 20 April 1949) was a French civil servant who combined a career in administration with studies in the ethnology, languages, and history of French West Africa.

== Career ==
=== Early years (1871–1893) ===
Charles Monteil was born in Paris on 22 February 1871. He was the brother of Parfait-Louis Monteil (1855–1925), a French colonial military officer and explorer. He was admitted to the military academy of Saint-Cyr in 1892.

=== French West Africa (1893–1902) ===
Monteil's brother Louis-Parfait took him to French West Africa in 1893, where he began work as a native affairs clerk, and later rose through several administrative levels and held many positions. At one time he was the deputy of Maurice Delafosse in the Ivory Coast. In 1898 Monteil was the first to have collected a soninké version of the legend of Wagadu on the founding of the Mandingo Empire, published in 1967 in an edition edited by Abdoulaye Bathily. He wrote the answer to the Questionnaire concerning the legal customs of the natives of Africa issued by the Berlin-based International Union of Law and Political Economy and transmitted by the French Colonial Union. He was promoted to head of the Djenné cercle in May 1901. Between then and December 1902 he recorded 800 interviews with the educated people of the city, published in Dakar in 1965.

=== Later career (1902–1949) ===
Monteil was head of the French Sudan economy and trade office at the Colonial Office in Paris for two years. He was a senior writer at the Caisse des dépôts et consignations in Paris from 1904 to 1911. He also lectured in Sudanese languages at the National School of Living Oriental Languages (École nationale des langues orientales vivantes) from 1904 to 1909. He graduated with a degree in law in 1911. He was a receiver of finance until 1936. He worked with the Comité des études historiques et scientifiques de l’AOF and the Institut d’Afrique Noire in Dakar, Senegal. Monteil died in Tulle on 20 April 1949. His son, Vincent M. Monteil, was also the author of many works about Africa.

== Awards ==
Monteil received awards from the National Agricultural Society of France in 1903, the Geographical Society of Paris in 1916 and 1924 (gold medal), and the Institute of France (Academy of Moral and Political Sciences) in 1917 and 1925. He was made a Chevalier of the Legion of Honour and Officer of the Academy. He was a holder of the Colonial Medal (Ivory Coast). He was elected a corresponding member of the Academy of Colonial Sciences from its foundation in 1923.

== Publications ==
Monteil published many books and articles on the languages, history, and ethnography of French West Africa.

In an article on La Legende du Wagadu. D'après Tudo Yaresi (1953) Monteil discusses the origin of Dinga, founder of the Ghana Empire, who came from lands in the direction of Mecca, spent some time in Djenné, and had many descendants from three marriages. Monteil suggests that Dinga's family came from Jerusalem and he was descended from Solomon by Yuba (Job). He was born in Lulami or Durame, spent his youth in Masya, went to Uruguntu where his mother died, and arrived in Louti where he acquired power over the rain, before coming to Djenné.

In a posthumous article on Problems of Western Sudan Monteil presents the hypothesis that modern blacksmiths and singers in West Africa are descended from Judaised blacks, which he bases on the idea of a period of Jewish hegemony in the Maghreb before the Arabs arrived. These Jews would have first reached Mali as gold traders. Later, the Judaised Berbers would have fled from the Arabs and then from the Muslim Berbers, moving first to the Adrar of Mauritania and then south of the Senegal River. The theory is based only on a text by the Arab geographer Muhammad al-Idrisi (1100–65), and on Sudanese local traditions about the origins of the blacksmiths.

His works include:

- Charles Monteil (1903), Soudan français. Monographie de Djenné, cercle et ville, Tulle: impr. de J. Mazeyrie, p. 360
- Charles Monteil (1905), Soudan français. Contes soudanais, Preface by René Basset, Paris: E. Leroux, p. 205
- C. Pierre; Charles Monteil (1905), L'Élevage au Soudan, Preface by Jean Dybowski, Paris: A. Challamel / Bibliothèque d'agriculture coloniale, p. 204
- Charles Monteil (1915), Les Khassonké : monographie d'une peuplade du Soudan français, Paris: E. Leroux, p. 528
- Charles Monteil (1924), Les Bambara du Ségou et du Kaarta (Publications du Comité d'études historiques et scientifiques), Rochefort-sur-Mer / Paris: Impr. Nobertine / Emile Larose, libr.-éditeur
- Charles Monteil (1927), Le Coton chez les noirs, Rochefort-sur-Mer / Paris: Impr. A. Thoyon-Thèze / libr. Emile Larose / Comité d'études historiques et scientifiques de l'Afrique occidentale française, p. 100
- Charles Monteil (1930), Les empires du Mali (Etude d'histoire de sociologie soudanaises) (Extr. du : "Bull. Com. d'études hist. et scientif. de l'A.O.F". t. XII, N° 3-4, juillet-décembre 1929), Paris: Librairie Larose, p. 160
- Charles Monteil (January–June 1931), "La divination chez les Noirs de l'Afrique occidentale française", Bull. Comité d'études historiques et scientifiques de l'A.O.F., XIV (1–2): 27–136
- Charles Monteil (1932), Une Cité soudanaise, Djénné, métropole du delta central du Niger, Paris: Société d'éditions maritimes et coloniales, p. 304 Second edition published in 1971 by Anthropos and the Institut International Africain with a preface by his son Vincent Monteil.
- Charles Monteil (1932), La langue des Bozo, population de pêcheurs du Niger (Extr. de : "Bull. Com. d'études hist. et scientif. de l'A.O.F.", Paris, t. XV, Nos 2-3, avril-sept. 1932, p. 261-399)
- Charles Monteil (1939), "La langue azer", L'étude du Sahara occidental Fasc. II, Paris: Larose, p. 344
- Charles Monteil (1951), Les "Ghâna" des géographes arabes et des européens (Extr. de : Hesperis. 1951. XXXVIII. 441-452)
- Charles Monteil (1951), Problèmes du Soudan occidental : Juifs et judaîsés (Extr. de : Hesperis. 1951. XXXVIII. 265-298), Annotated by Vincent-Mansour Monteil

== Sources ==
- Abbey, M.T. Rosalie Akouele (2011-12-07), Customary Law and Slavery in West Africa, Trafford Publishing, ISBN 978-1-4269-7119-8
- Camara, Sory (1992), Gens de la parole: essai sur la condition et le rôle des griots dans la société malinké (in French), KARTHALA Editions, ISBN 978-2-86537-354-3
- Charles Monteil (1871-1949) (in French), BnF: Bibliotheque nationale de France
- Dulucq, Sophie (2009), Ecrire l'histoire de l'Afrique à l'époque coloniale: XIXe-XXe siècles (in French), KARTHALA Editions, ISBN 978-2-8111-0290-6
- Koné, Sixeau Daouda (2015), Le peuplement ancien en Basse-Guinée: XIIe-XIXe siècles (in French), L'Harmattan, ISBN 978-2-343-06087-3
- MONTEIL Charles (in French), Académie des sciences d'outre-mer, 2010, archived from the original on 2018-06-18
- Monteil, Vincent (1984), "Charles Monteil (1871-1949)", Hommes et destins : Dictionnaire biographique d'outre-mer (in French), vol. 5, Académie des sciences d'outre-mer, ISBN 2-900098-05-X
- Richard-Molard, Jacques (July–October 1949), "In memoriam : Charles Monteil", Bulletin de l'Institut français d'Afrique noire (in French), 11 (3–4)
