= Dinga (ruler) =

Soninke founder of Wagadou

- Kaya Maghan
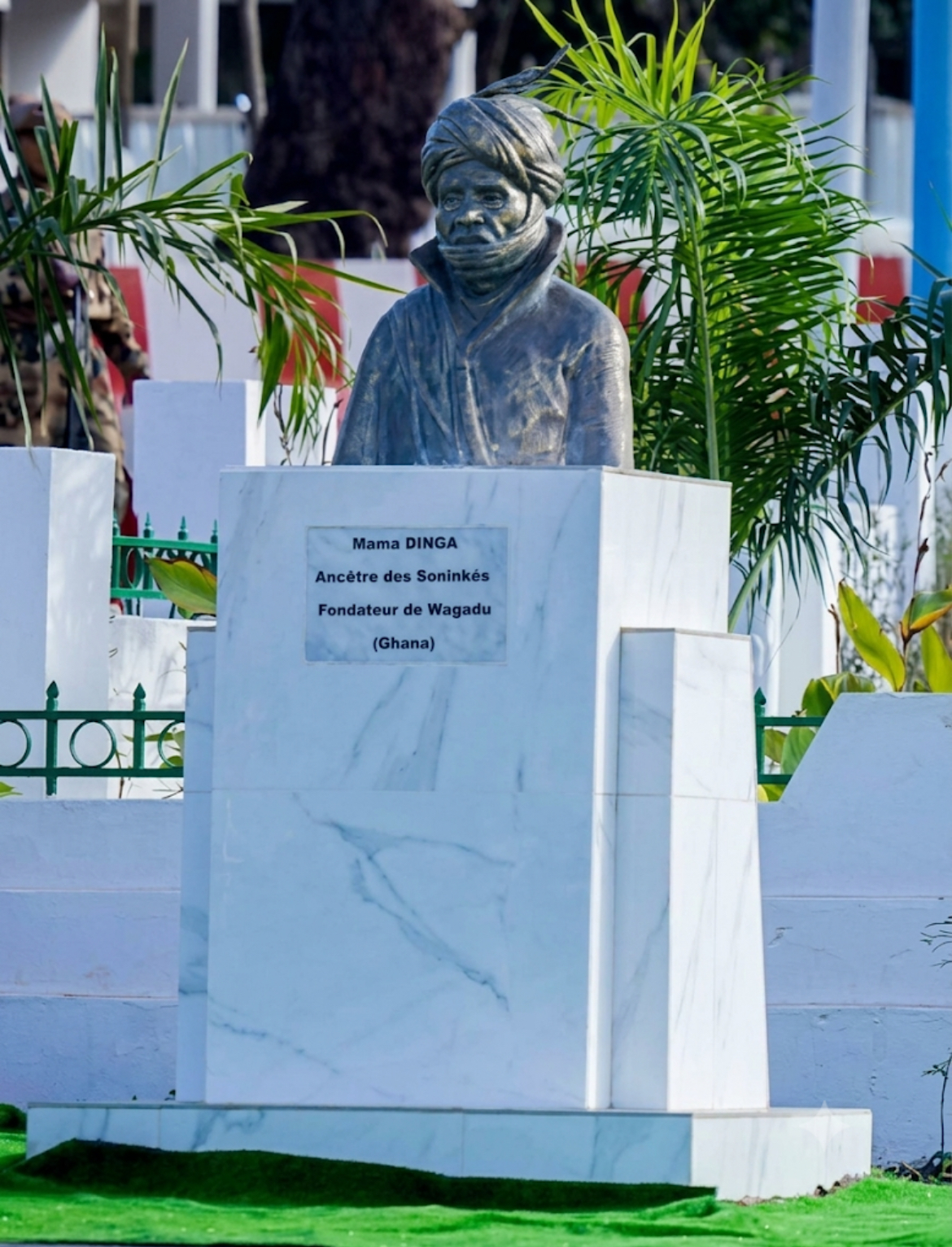
- Bust of Dinga
- Reign: 4th century CE
- Predecessor: None
- Successor: Diabe Cisse
- Dynasty: Cisse dynasty

Dinga, also known as Dinka, Dinga Cissé or Kaya Maghan (meaning ruler of gold) (c. 300) was the possibly legendary Soninke founder of Wagadou, also known as the Ghana Empire. He founded the Cissé dynasty which ruled the empire from the 4th century CE to the end of the 11th century.

According to Soninke oral traditions, Dinga immigrated westwards from the east, sometimes specified as Yemen, a theme commonly found in West African ethnogenesis legends. His first wife was barren, but he took four others, each of whom was mother to various different Soninke clans. His third wife, Diangana-Boro, gave birth to six children; the last of them was the mythical snake, Bida. His fourth wife, Kantana-Boro, gave birth to five Cissé kings of Wagadou. The first of these, Diabe Cissé, concluded a pact with Bida to sacrifice a virgin to the snake every year in exchange for plentiful rains and gold.

The legend of Dinga is also widespread among the Songhai people.
