= Ghana Empire =

Empire in West Africa from c. 200s to c. 1200s

Coordinates: 15°40′N 8°00′W

Ghana Empire Wagadu
- c. 300–mid-13th century
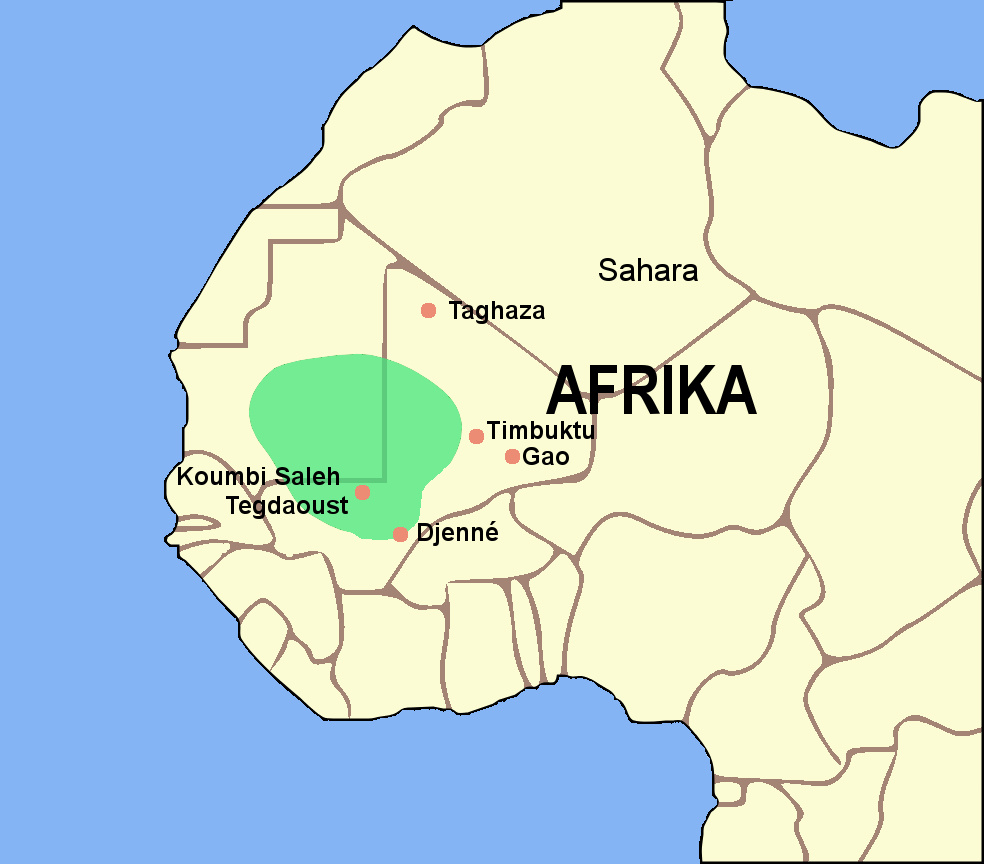
- The Ghana Empire at its greatest extent
- Capital: Koumbi Saleh (likely a later capital)
- Common languages: Soninke, Berber Malinke, Mande
- Religion: African traditional religion Later Islam
- Government: Monarchy
- History
  - Established: c. 300
  - Conversion to Islam: 11th century
  - Conquered by Sosso/Submitted to the Mali Empire: mid-13th century

Area
- 1000: 650,000 km^{2} (250,000 sq mi)
Preceded by
Tichitt culture
Djenné-Djenno
Succeeded by
Sosso Empire
Kingdom of Diarra
Méma
Pre-imperial Mali
Gajaaga
- Today part of: Mali; Mauritania; Senegal

The Ghana Empire (Arabic: غانا), also known as simply Ghana, Ghanata, or Wagadu, was an ancient western-Sahelian empire based in the modern-day southeast of Mauritania and western Mali.

It is uncertain among historians when Ghana's ruling dynasty began. The first identifiable mention of the imperial dynasty in written records was made by Muḥammad ibn Mūsā al-Khwārizmī in 830. Further information about the empire was provided by the accounts of Cordoban scholar al-Bakri when he wrote about the region in the 11th century.

After centuries of prosperity, the empire began its decline in the second millennium, and would finally become a vassal state of the rising Mali Empire at some point in the 13th century. Despite its collapse, the empire's influence can be felt in the establishment of numerous urban centers throughout its former territory. In 1957, the Gold Coast, under the leadership of Kwame Nkrumah named itself Ghana upon independence.

== Etymology ==
The word Ghana means warrior or war chief, and was the title given to the rulers of the kingdom. Kaya Maghan (king of gold) was another title for these kings. The Soninke name for the polity was Ouagadou. This meant the "place of the Wague", the term current in the 19th century for the local nobility or may have meant 'the land of great herds'.

== Origin historiography ==
=== Oral traditions ===
According to oral traditions, although they vary much amongst themselves, the legendary progenitor of the Soninke was a man named Dinga, who came "from the east," after which he migrated to a variety of locations in western Sudan, in each place leaving children by different wives. In order to take power, he had to kill a serpent deity (named Bida) and then marry his daughters, who became the ancestors of the clans that were dominant in the region at the time. Some traditions hold he made a deal with Bida to sacrifice one maiden a year in exchange for rainfall, and other versions add a constant supply of gold. Upon Dinga's death, his two sons Khine and Dyabe contested the kingship, and Dyabe was victorious, founding Wagadu.

Bida is stressed as a protective force by narrators; some versions have Bida descending from Dinga, with his children founding Wagadu. Pythons are most at home in grasslands near water and likely came to be associated with the seasonal rains, with them rarely being seen during the dry periods. As such, snake deities feature prominently in West African traditional religions. The Bida tradition details Wagadu's founding and fall. This tale appears to have been a fragment of what once was a much longer narrative, now lost, however the legend of Wagadu continues to have a deep-rooted significance in Soninke culture and history. The tradition of Gassire's lute mentions Wagadu's fall.

The traditions of the Hassaniya Arabs and Berbers in Mauritania maintain that the earliest occupants of areas such as the Adrar and Tagant were Black. These regions, part of the core of Wagadu, remained largely Soninke until at least the 16th century.

According to the Mandingo tradition, Ghana empire was ruled by «White» (Berber) rulers from about 5th to about 7th centuries. However, then came a change of dynasty and new line of Berber kings ruled until about 850.

=== Medieval Arab writers and a Berber origin ===
The earliest discussions of Ghana's origins are found in the Sudanese chronicles of Mahmud Kati (the Tarikh al-Fattash) and Abd al-Rahman as-Sadi (the Tarikh al-Sudan). Addressing the rulers' origin, the Tarikh al-Fattash offers three different theories: that they were Soninke; or Wangara (a Soninke/Mande group), which the author considered improbable; or that they were Sanhaja Berbers, which the author considered most likely. The author concludes that "the nearest to the truth is that they were not black." This interpretation derived from his opinion that the rulers' genealogies linked them to the Berbers. The Tarikh al-Sudan further states that "In origin they were white, though we do not know to whom they trace their origin. Their subjects, however, were Wa'kore [Soninke]." Chronicles by al-Idrisi in the 11th century and Ibn Said in the 13th noted that rulers of Ghana traced their descent from the clan of Muhammad, either through his protector Abi Talib or through his son-in-law Ali.

French colonial officials, notably Maurice Delafosse, concluded that Ghana had been founded by the Berbers and linked them to North African and Middle Eastern origins. Delafosse produced a convoluted theory of an invasion by "Judeo-Syrians", which he linked to the Fulbe (who actually co-founded Takrur).

Trade routes of the Western Sahara c. 1000–1500. Goldfields are indicated by light brown shading: Bambuk, Bure, Lobi, and Akan.

This idea of a foreign origin for Wagadu is generally disregarded by modern scholars. Levtzion and Spaulding, for example, argue that al-Idrisi's testimony should be looked at skeptically due to serious miscalculations in geography and historical chronology. The archaeologist and historian Raymond Mauny argues that al-Kati's and al-Saadi's theories were based on the presence (after Ghana's demise) of nomadic Berbers originally from Libya, and the assumption that they were the ruling caste in an earlier age. Earlier accounts such Ya'qubi (872 CE), al-Masudi (c. 944 CE), Ibn Hawqal (977 CE), al-Biruni (c. 1036 CE), and al-Bakri (1068 CE) all describe the population and rulers of Ghana as "negroes". Delafosse's works, meanwhile, have been harshly criticised by scholars such as Charles Monteil, Robert Cornevin and others for being "unacceptable" and "too creative to be useful to historians", particularly in relation to his interpretation of West African genealogies.

=== Modern archaeology and a local origin ===
Beginning in the mid 20th century as more archeological data became available, scholars began to favor a purely local origin for Ghana. These works bring together archaeology, descriptive geographical sources written between 830 and 1400 CE, the Tarikhs from the 16th and 17th centuries, and the oral traditions. In 1969 Patrick Munson excavated at Dhar Tichitt (a site associated with the ancestors of the Soninke), which clearly reflected a complex culture that was present by 1600 BCE and had architectural and material cultural elements similar to those found at Koumbi Saleh in the 1920s.

The earliest proto-polity ancestral to Ghana likely arose from a large collection of ancient proto-Mande agro-pastoralist chiefdoms that were spread over the western-most portion of the Niger River basin for over a millennium roughly spanning 1300 BCE – 300 BCE. Munsun theorized that, around 700 BCE Libyco-Berbers raiders destroyed this burgeoning state. Their opening of a trade route north, however, eventually changed the economic calculus from raiding to trade, and the native Soninke reasserted themselves around 300 BCE. This trade and the development of ironworking technology were crucial in the formation of the state. Work in Dhar Tichitt, Dhar Nema and Dhar Walata has shown that, as the desert advanced, the local groups moved southward into the still well-watered areas of what is now northern Mali.

=== Niger Bend theory ===
Historian Dierk Lange has argued that the core of Wagadou was not Koumbi Saleh but in fact lay near Lake Faguibine, on the Niger Bend. This area was historically more fertile than the Tichitt zone, and Lange draws on oral traditions to support his argument, contending that dynastic struggles in the 11th century pushed the capital west.

== History ==
=== Origins ===
Towards the end of the 3rd century CE, a wet period in the Sahel created areas for human habitation and exploitation which had not been habitable for the best part of a millennium, resulting in Wagadu rising out of the Tichitt culture. The introduction of the camel to the western Sahara in the 3rd century CE and pressure from the nomadic Saharan Sanhaja served as major catalysts for the transformative social changes that resulted in the empire's formation. By the time of the Muslim conquest of North Africa in the 7th century, the camel had changed the ancient, irregular trade routes into a network running between North Africa and the Niger River. Soninke tradition portrays early Ghana as very warlike, with horse-mounted warriors key to increasing its territory and population, although details of their expansion are extremely scarce. Wagadu made its profits from maintaining a monopoly on gold heading north and salt heading south, despite not controlling the gold fields themselves. It is possible that Wagadu's dominance on trade allowed for the gradual consolidation of many smaller polities into a confederated state, whose composites stood in varying relations to the core, from fully administered to nominal tribute-paying parity. Based on large tumuli scattered across West Africa dating to this period, it has been proposed that relative to Wagadu there were many more simultaneous and preceding kingdoms which have been lost to time.

=== First apogee and early Arab records ===
Information about the empire's origins and when it was at its height are sparse. Suggestions by later North African visitors to Ghana mention twenty rulers before the coming of Muhammad. According to Kati's Tarikh al-Fettash, in a section probably composed around 1580 but citing the chief judge Ida al-Massini who lived somewhat earlier, twenty kings ruled Ghana before the advent of Islam. Al-Sadi purports that approximately 18 through 34 ancient Kaya (kings) ruled before the Hijra and 24 more kaya (kings) ruled afterward.

In 734 the Umayyad Caliphate launched an expedition, commanded by Habib ibn Abi Ubayda al-Fihri, against the Sous and Sudan. While the location and outcome of this expedition to the Sudan is unknown, Al-Bakri writing in the 11th century noted that the descendants of these troops, called the Hunayhin, could still be found within the Ghana Empire and that they were now following the native religion. At this time, when Muslim merchants first crossed the desert, Ghana was the most powerful state in the Sahel.

The earliest mention of Ghana is in an Arabic source of 788–93. By the time Arab writers started describing the Ghana Empire in the 8th century it was already regarded as a wealthy state that Muḥammad ibn Ibrāhīm al-Fazārī lists as being equal in size to the Idrisid state of Morocco while also coining it the "Land of Gold." And in 833 was featured on Al-Khwarizmi's world map. It had developed a trade route that led directly to Egypt and was recorded to have also been used by Egyptian and Nubian merchants to visit the Sudan, but it was closed during the reign of Ahmad ibn Tulun (r. 868–84), due to safety concerns.

About 850, a revolution took place in Ghana. People put a black dynasty, of the Soninke clan, upon the throne. The Berber king was killed. Probably the Arab conquest of the Mahgrib had upset the Berber states north of the Sahara. This might have reduced trade across the desert for a time, and weakened Berber control of the Sudan. Many Berbers fled from Ghana.

The 9th century historian Al-Ya'qubi describes its king as very powerful and mentions the gold mines and the number of vassals under their authority. Al-Masudi, writing in the first half of the 10th century, refers to the King of Ghana as supreme with vassals under him and describes the kingdom itself as being of great importance because of its gold trade. Adding to the newly gained prestige of Ghana, Ibn Hawqal writing during the 970s proclaimed the King of Ghana as the "wealthiest king on the face of the earth," who also maintained relations with the king of Aoudaghost. In 990, presumably for commercial and economic reasons, the Ghana Empire conquered Awdaghust and installed its own governor.

Written sources are vague as to the empire's maximum extent. Oral traditions indicate that, at its height, the empire controlled Takrur, Jafunu, Jaara, Bakhunu, Neema, Soso, Guidimakha, Guidimé, Gajaaga, as well as the Awker, Adrar, and Hodh to the north. It also had some degree of influence over Kaniaga, Kaarta, and Khasso. Diabe, supposedly the son of Dinga, is sometimes given credit for driving the Mandinka out of the Gajaaga. Two other Soninke groups to the south, the Gaja and the Karo, were dominated by the Wagu.

During the 1060s they were at war with Silla as reported by Al-Bakri. At this time the ruler of Ghana was Tunka Manin, who had succeeded Ghana Bassi in 1063. He makes mention of scholars, jurists, salaried imams, and muezzins there, and that the kings interpreters, the official in charge of the treasury, and the majority of the kings ministers were Muslim. Tunka Manin was also in written correspondence with Yusuf ibn Tashfin and the Almoravids during this decade.

=== Almoravids ===
Given the scattered nature of the Arabic sources and the ambiguity of the existing archaeological record, it is difficult to determine when and how Ghana declined. With the gradual drying of the Sahel, the all-important epicenters of trade began to move south to the Niger River and west to the Senegal River. This gradually strengthened Ghana's vassals while weakening the core. Awdaghost, at the time a seat of the king, fell to the Almoravids in 1054.

Ghana Bassi died in 1063, and was succeeded by his nephew Tunka Manin. This may have created a succession dispute with Bassi's son Qanamar, providing an opportunity for the Almoravids to intervene in the empire, promoting pro-Islam candidates for the throne.

A tradition in historiography maintains that Ghana was conquered by the Almoravid dynasty in 1076–77, but this interpretation has been sharply questioned by modern scholars. Conrad and Fisher (1982) argued that the notion of any Almoravid military conquest at its core is merely perpetuated folklore, derived from a misinterpretation or naive reliance on Arabic sources. Dierke Lange agrees but argues that this does not preclude Almoravid political agitation, claiming that Ghana's demise owed much to the latter.

The first to hint of a supposed conquest was Ibn Khaldun who was writing 300 years after and even then doesn't outright claim any Almoravid conquest of Ghana. Al-Ghazali, a contemporary of the Almoravids at the peak of their size and the alleged conquest, explicitly references the Almoravids as only bordering the Ghana Empire and the land of the Franks. In the 16th century many notables of the Saadi Kingdom of Morocco, in an attempt to dissuade al-Mansur from fighting Songhai, argued that none of the previous Moroccan dynasties had ever attempted such an expedition into the Sudan. Indicating that such a conquest wasn't known in their history. Furthermore, the archaeology of ancient Ghana does not show the signs of rapid change and destruction that would be associated with any Almoravid-era military conquests.

Sheryl L. Burkhalter in 1992 suggested that there were reasons to believe that there was conflict between the Almoravids and the empire of Ghana. Ibn Khaldun, a 14th-century North African historian who read and cited both al-Bakri and al-Idrisi, reported an ambiguous account of the country's history as related to him by 'Uthman, a faqih of Ghana who took a pilgrimage to Mecca in 1394, according to which the power of Ghana waned as that of the "veiled people" grew through the Almoravid movement.

=== Second apogee ===
Whether the Almoravids conquered Ghana or not, the country certainly did convert to Islam around 1076. This conversion and its accompanying rejection of the earlier, more accommodating Islam may have pushed the Wangara diaspora throughout the region. In 1083, Ghana requested the help of the Almoravids to attack and conquer Tadmekka, Silla, an unidentified town named NSLA, and may have reached Gao, helping to spread Sunni orthodoxy there as well. Zafun is implied to have also fallen under Ghana's authority around this time too, although without Almoravid help.

Yaqut al-Hamawi, writing in 1220, recounting an event that occurred sometime during the first half of the 12th century, records an interaction between the Almoravids and the king of Zafun, a province within the Ghana Empire or possibly a reference to the king of Ghana himself:

The king of Zafun is stronger than the latter and more versed in the art of kingship. The veiled people acknowledge his superiority over them, obey him and resort to him in all important matters of government. One year this king, on his way to the Pilgrimage, came to the Maghrib to pay a visit to the Commander of the Muslims, the Veiled King of the Maghrib, of the tribe of the Lamtuna. The Commander of the Muslims met him on foot, whereas the [King of] Zafun did not dismount for him. A certain person who saw him in Marrakeh on the day he came there said that he was tall, of deep black complexion and veiled. The whites of his eyes were bloodshot as if they were two glowing coals, and the palms of his hands were yellow as if tinted with saffron. He was wearing a cut (maqtu) garment enveloped in a white cloak. He entered the palace of the Commander of the Muslims mounted, while the latter walked in front of him.

Al-Idrisi, whose account was written in 1154, has the country fully Muslim by that date. He describes an empire as powerful as it had been in the days of al-Bakri, 75 years earlier. In fact, he describes its capital as "the greatest of all towns of the Sudan with respect to area, the most populous, and with the most extensive trade." This capital may not be the same city as the one described by al-Bakri, however. More places during this time are mentioned as being under Ghana's authority such as the land of Wanqara, Tiraqqa, Madasa; A berber region and town, the region of Saghmara; A berber nomadic area near Tadmekka, Samaqanda, Gharbil, and Ghiyara. Ghana was the master of an extensive trade system in the Senegal river valley, first established by Takrur in the 10th century, that exported salt from Awlil throughout the region. It also controlled the gold mines of Bambuk. During this period it was fully Islamized, and the judicial system had shifted to something more closely resembling Sharia.

Al-Sharīshī, writing in the late 12th century mentions the spread of Islam among its inhabitants and makes note their schools.

=== Sosso occupation ===
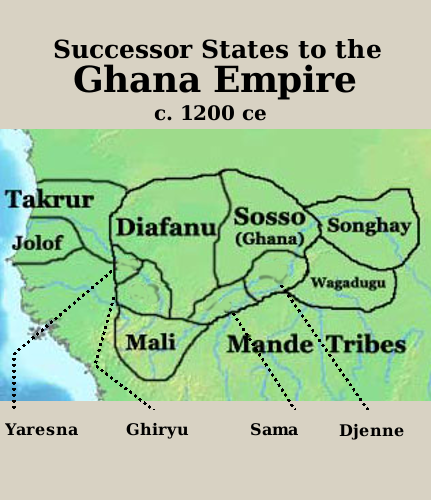
Map of successor states to the Ghana Empire

This resurgence did not last, however. By 1203, the Sosso had risen against their masters and conquered Ghana, establishing a short-lived empire. Soninke traditions attribute Ghana's fall to a noble who killed Bida in order to save a maiden from sacrifice (against her wish), unleashing a curse which caused a 7 year-long drought and famine, (Note: The generation of Soninke that survived the drought were called "it has been hard for them" ("a jara nununa") and given the family name Gumané.) with some traditions including the discovery of gold at Bure and an increase in production there while supply decreased at Bambuk. (Note: In Bambuk, gold was collected via alluvial deposits, so drought could have meant no new deposits.)

According to much later traditions, from the late nineteenth and twentieth centuries, Diara Kante of Sosso took control of Koumbi Saleh and established the Diarisso dynasty. His son, Soumaoro Kante, succeeded him and forced the people to pay him tribute. The Sosso also managed to annex the neighboring Mandinka state of Kangaba to the south, where the important goldfields of Bure were located.

=== Vassal of Mali ===
In his brief overview of Sudanese history, Ibn Khaldun related that "the people of Mali outnumbered the peoples of the Sudan in their neighborhood and dominated the whole region." He went on to relate that they "vanquished the Susu and acquired all their possessions, both their ancient kingdom and that of Ghana." According to a modern tradition, this resurgence of Mali was led by Sundiata Keita, the founder of Mali and ruler of its core area of Kangaba. Delafosse assigned an arbitrary but widely accepted date of 1235 to the event.

This tradition states that Ghana Soumaba Cisse, at the time a vassal of the Sosso, rebelled with Kangaba and became part of a loose federation of Mande-speaking states. After Soumaoro's defeat at the Battle of Kirina in 1235 (a date again assigned arbitrarily by Delafosse), the new rulers of Koumbi Saleh became permanent allies of the Mali Empire. As Mali became more powerful, the Ghana's role as an ally declined to that of a submissive state, although he was still accorded prestige as the leader of an ancient and storied state. According to a detailed account of from al-Umari, written around 1340 but based on testimony given to him by the "truthful and trustworthy" shaykh Abu Uthman Sa'id al-Dukkali, Ghana still retained its functions as a sort of kingdom within the empire, its ruler being the only one allowed to bear the title malik and "who is like a deputy unto him."

Koumbi Saleh was abandoned sometime in the 15th century.

== Economy and Trade ==
Since the 6th–7th centuries CE, the Ghana Empire was in charge of trade in central West Africa. They had their own precious resources such as gold, copper, ivory, and salt. Their control of regional trade led to West African trading with North African merchants that brought camel caravans across the Sahara. This established Trans-Saharan trade. Important gold trade routes passed through the capital of Ancient Ghana, Koumbi Saleh. Trade extended throughout the Sahara to kingdoms in southern Europe, which had a very high demand for the precious metal. Demand was also high because Muslim states used gold coins (dinar) as currency. This is what linked Ghana to the Middle East and Europe.

Most of the information about the economy of Ghana comes from al-Bakri. He noted that merchants had to pay a tax of one gold dinar on imports of salt, and two on exports of salt. Other products had fixed dues; al-Bakri mentioned both copper and other goods. However, there is no evidence to suggest that the trade of gold was taxed. Exports probably included products such as textiles, ornaments, and other materials. Many of the hand-crafted leather goods found in present-day Morocco also had their origins in the empire. al-Bakri also mentioned that Muslims played a central role in commerce and held court appointments.

Ibn Hawqal quotes the use of a cheque worth 42,000 dinars. The main centre of trade was Koumbi Saleh. The king claimed as his own all nuggets of gold, and allowed other people to have only 'gold dust'. In addition to the influence exerted by the king in local regions, tribute was received from various tributary states and chiefdoms on the empire's periphery. The introduction of the camel played a key role in Soninke success as well, allowing products and goods to be transported much more efficiently across the Sahara. These contributing factors all helped the empire remain powerful for some time, providing a rich and stable economy based on trading gold, iron, salt and slaves.

In its last centuries, Ghana increasingly lost control of the gold trade to the Mali Empire and relied on slave raiding and trading as a principal economic activity.

== Government ==
Kingship was based on matrilineal descent, and traditionally passed to the son of the king's sister. Testimony about ancient Ghana depended on how well disposed the king was to foreign travelers, from whom the majority of information on the empire comes. Islamic writers often commented on the social-political stability of the empire based on the seemingly just actions and grandeur of the king. Al-Bakri, a Moorish nobleman living in Spain questioned merchants who visited the empire in the 11th century and wrote of the king:

He sits in audience or to hear grievances against officials in a domed pavilion around which stand ten horses covered with gold-embroidered materials. Behind the king stand ten pages holding shields and swords decorated with gold, and on his right are the sons of the kings of his country wearing splendid garments and their hair plaited with gold. The governor of the city sits on the ground before the king and around him are ministers seated likewise. At the door of the pavilion are dogs of excellent pedigree that hardly ever leave the place where the king is, guarding him. Around their necks they wear collars of gold and silver studded with a number of balls of the same metals.

Ghana appears to have had a central core region and was surrounded by vassal states. One of the earliest sources to describe Ghana, al-Ya'qubi, writing in 889/90 (276 AH) says that "under his authority are a number of kings" which included Sama and 'Am (?) and so extended at least to the Niger River valley. These "kings" were presumably the rulers of the territorial units often called kafu in Mandinka.

The Arabic sources are vague as to how the country was governed. Al-Bakri, far and away the most detailed one, mentions that the king had officials (mazalim) who surrounded his throne when he gave justice, and these included the sons of the "kings of his country" which we must assume are the same kings that al-Ya'qubi mentioned in his account of nearly 200 years earlier. Al-Bakri's detailed geography of the region shows that in his day, or 1067/1068, Ghana was surrounded by independent kingdoms, and Sila, one of them located on the Senegal River, was "almost a match for the king of Ghana." Sama is the only such entity mentioned as a province, as it was in al-Ya'qubi's day.

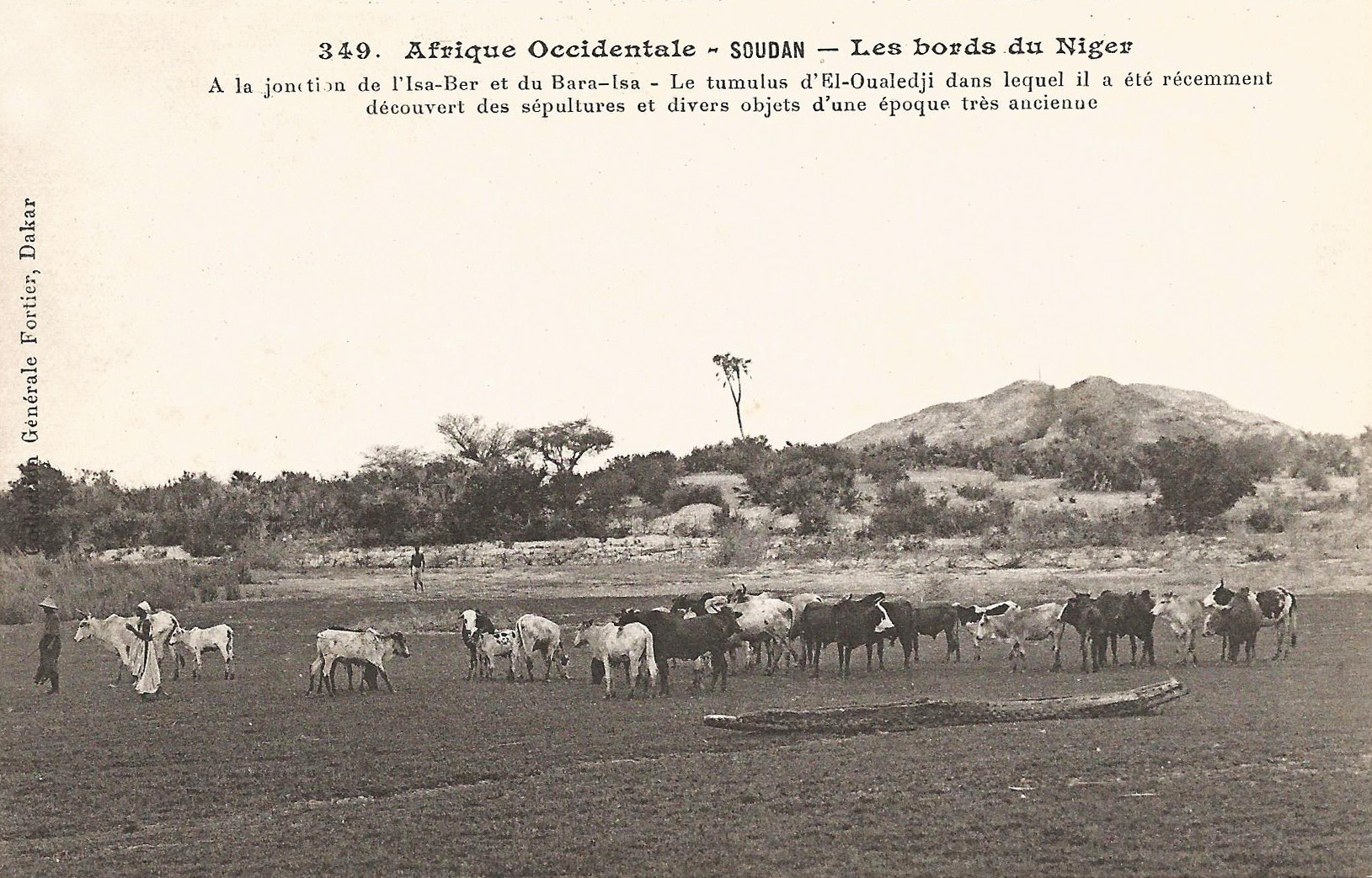
Tumulus of El-Oualedji near Tindirma

In al-Bakri's time, the rulers of Ghana had begun to incorporate more Muslims into government, including the treasurer, his interpreter, and "the majority of his officials." Rulers were buried in tumuli after having lay in state for several days, and accompanied by home comforts and all the eating and drinking utensils he had used, filled with offerings.

=== List of rulers ===
There is no generally-accepted regnal list of Wagadu, with various sources reporting different names. The Tarikh al-Sudan has 22 rulers ruling the empire before the time of the Prophet Muhammad, and 22 after, without naming any of them. The Tarikh al-fattash places 20 unnamed kings before Muhammad, and claims that the last one, Kanissa'ay, lived during the prophet's time.

Dinga is universally cited as an important ancestor of the Wagadu rulers, while Diabe Cisse is unanimously named the founder of the dynasty. The most comprehensive and well-known regnal list is that collected by Charles Monteil in the 1890s in Goumbou and published in 1953. His version of the Wagadu legend names six kings who were sons of Dinga (Dyabe Sise, Kuya Sise, Kuyate Kuya Sise, Tane Sise, Fankante Sise, Soki-mira Sise), as well as the last sovereign of Wagadu, Ture Khankhedyaba. Another version collected near Nioro in 1903 names Diabe, Tane, Tane Fankante, Mamadou and Komma.

Maurice Delafosse collected the following list in Nioro du Sahel, publishing it in 1913: Diabe Sisse, Tane Sisse, Tane Fankante Sisse, Mamadi Sisse, and Kaya Sisse.

Louis Frédéric Tautain collected another list in the 1880s near Goumbou. It includes a Cisse dynasty and then, without mentioning a decline or exodus, a Jariso royal lineage. Some of the names he includes under the Cisse are assigned to provincial governors in other sources, and may simply be a catch-all of names.

- Cisse
  - Khaya Makha Sise' (Wagadu Makha)
  - Wakane' Sakho
  - D'amera Sokhna
  - Gumane Fade
  - Sero Khumma
- Jariso
  - Kambine Diaresso
  - Suleiman
  - Bannu Bubu
  - Wagadu Makha
  - Gane
  - Musa
  - Biramu

Written sources are almost non-existent. Al-Bakri names two ruling Ghanas from his time: Bassi (10??–1063) and Tunka Manin (1063–?). Oral histories also remember Soumaba Cisse as a king of Wagadu and an ally of Sundiata Keita in the 1300s.

== Military ==
Little is known about the military structure of the Ghana Empire, but contemporary sources indicate that it was very infantry reliant due to the various references to swords, spears, archers, and shields. Cavalry before the 13th century would've been used mostly for raids and skirmishes. Al-Dimashqi, recorded a shipyard in Ghana's capital that built warships.

== Koumbi Saleh ==
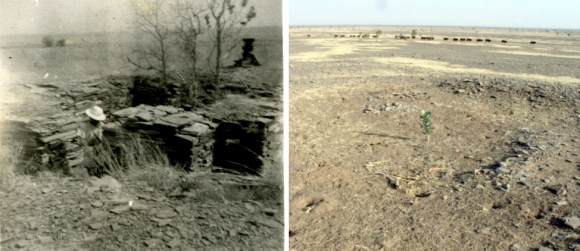
Central mausoleum in 1951 (left) and 2007 (right)

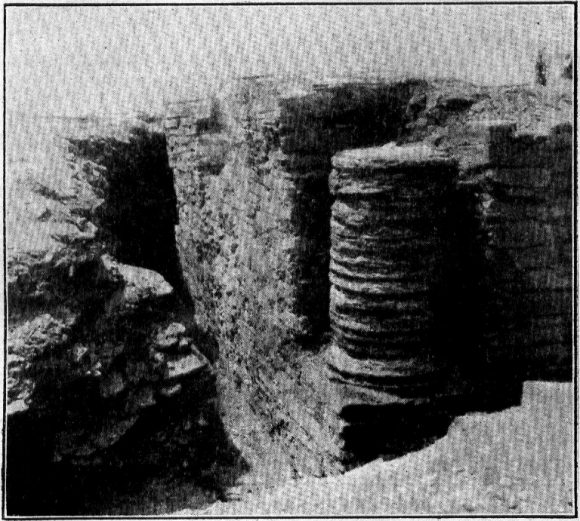
Column Tomb with remains of the corner columns still intact

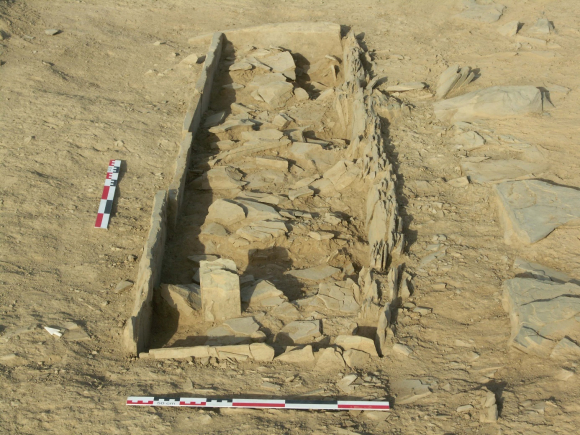
Individual burial from the Column Tomb with isolated stele placed at the head

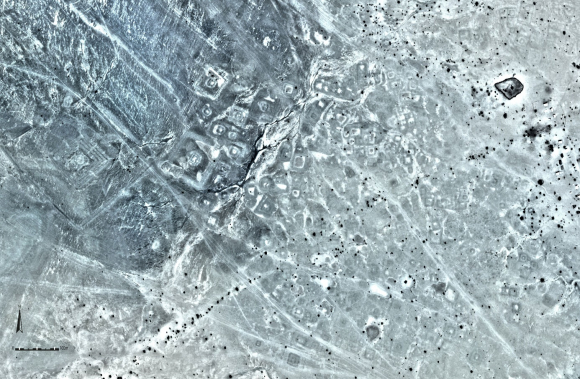
Western necropolis of Koumbi Saleh showing the density of funerary structures

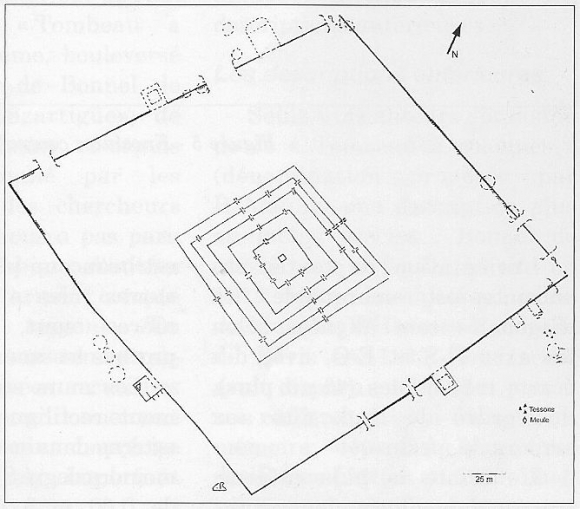
Funerary complex of the Column Tomb

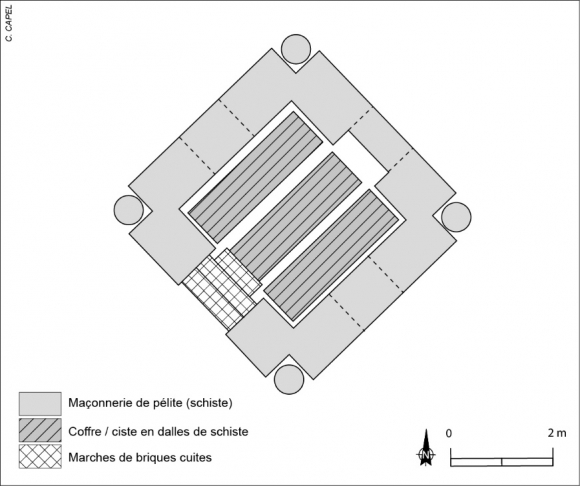
Central mausoleum (the qubba) of the Column Tomb

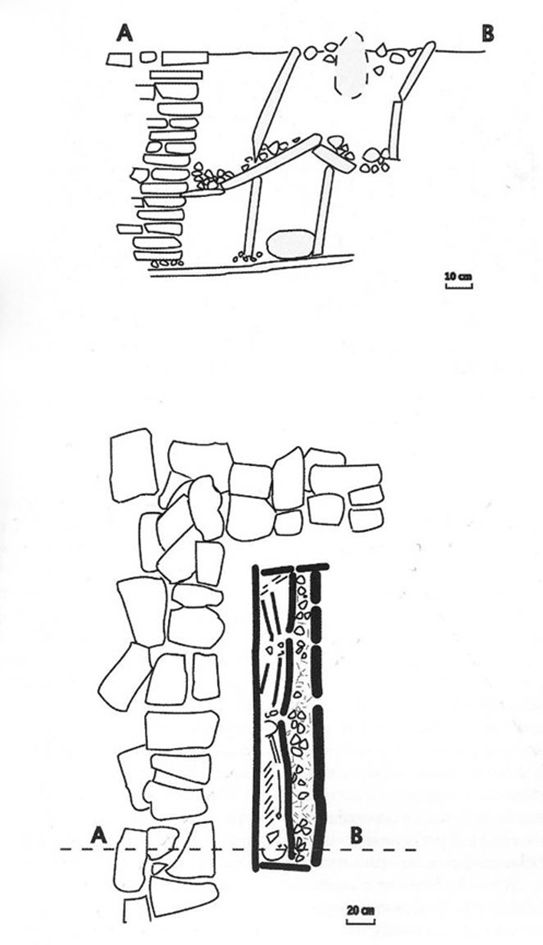
Burial excavation showing the over-pit system and surface arrangements

A 17th-century chronicle written in Timbuktu, the Tarikh al-fattash, gave the name of the empire's capital as "Koumbi". According to the description of the town left by Al-Bakri in 1067/1068, the capital actually consisted of two cities 10 kilometres (6 mi) apart but "between these two towns are continuous habitations", so that they might be said to have merged into one. The most common identification for this capital is the site of Koumbi Saleh on the rim of the Sahara desert.

=== El-Ghaba ===
According to al-Bakri, the major part of the city was called El-Ghaba and was the residence of the king. It was protected by a stone wall and functioned as the royal and spiritual capital of the Empire. It contained a sacred grove of trees in which priests lived. It also contained the king's palace, the grandest structure in the city, surrounded by other "domed buildings". There was also one mosque for visiting Muslim officials. (El-Ghaba, coincidentally or not, means "The Forest" in Arabic.)

=== Muslim district ===
The name of the other section of the city is not recorded. In the vicinity were wells with fresh water, used to grow vegetables. It was inhabited almost entirely by Muslims, who had with twelve mosques, one of which was designated for Friday prayers, and had a full group of scholars, scribes and Islamic jurists. Because the majority of these Muslims were merchants, this part of the city was probably its primary business district. It is likely that these inhabitants were largely black Muslims known as the Wangara and are today known as Jakhanke or Mandinka. The separate and autonomous towns outside of the main governmental center is a well-known practice used by the Jakhanke tribe of the Mandinka people throughout history.

=== Archaeology ===
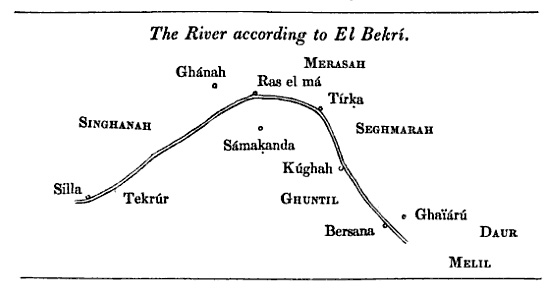
The Western Nile according to al-Bakri (1068)

Beginning in the 1920s, French archaeologists excavated the site of Koumbi Saleh, although there have always been controversies about the location of Ghana's capital and whether Koumbi Saleh is the same town as the one described by al-Bakri. The site was excavated in 1949–50 by Paul Thomassey and Raymond Mauny and by another French team in 1975–81. The remains of Koumbi Saleh are impressive, even if the remains of the royal town, with its large palace and burial mounds, have not been located.

=== Contested identification ===
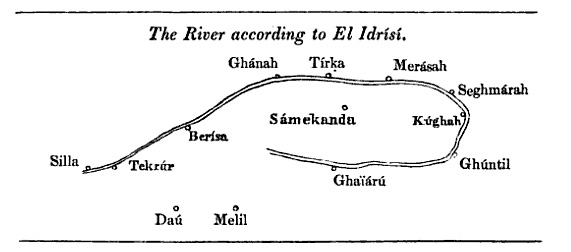
The Western Nile according to Muhammad al-Idrisi (1154)

In recent years, the identification of Koumbi Saleh with the 'city of Ghana' described in the sources has been increasingly disputed by scholars. al-Idrisi, a twelfth-century writer, described Ghana's royal city as lying on a riverbank, a river he called the "Nile." This followed the geographic custom of his day, which confused the Niger and Senegal Rivers and believed that they formed a single river often called the "Nile of the Blacks". Whether al-Idrisi was referring to a new and later capital located elsewhere, or whether there was confusion or corruption in his text is unclear. However, he does state that the royal palace he knew was built in 510 AH (1116–1117 CE), suggesting that it was a newer town, rebuilt closer to the river than Koumbi Saleh.

== Society ==
The empire was populated by ancient Mande tribes and would come under unity through the Soninke tribe of the greater Mande ethnic group, with its citizens living in deeply established patrilineal/paternal clans and family structures. The clothing of the people consisted of panther skins, robes of cotton, silk, and brocade, waist wrappers, loincloths, mantles, and fire proof clothing made from a special plant.

Ghana had developed higher learning institutions by the 11th century, with the first reference coming from Al-Bakri who mentioned the empire's scholars and jurists. Al-Zuhri stated that some of their scholars and lawyers had come to Al-Andalus and highly regarded them as being "preeminent." The most well known of these was the West African poet and grammarian Abu Ishaq Ibrahim al-Kanemi, who is recorded as having received his education in the Ghana Empire. Further mentions of their schools were made during the later part of the 12th century.

== See also ==
- History of the Soninke people
- Islam in Africa
- Mandé peoples
