= Silla (Senegal River Valley) =

Ancient town in the Senegal river valley

Silla or Silli was an ancient town in the Senegal River Valley. Its exact location is debated. Possible identifications include the site of Sinthiou Bara in the Matam Region of Senegal, the village of Silla near Kaedi in Mauritania, or a site closer to the juncture of the Senegal and Faleme rivers.

In the 11th century Silla was the prominent trading centre on the Senegal River. Al-Bakri described Silla as the capital of a ‘vast kingdom’ led by a ruler almost as grand as Ghana's/Wagadu's, but modern scholars tend to view it as a powerful city-state often politically dependent on its neighbors rather than a kingdom. The people converted to Islam during the time of War Jabi, king of neighboring Takrur and waged war against the pagan 'Lamlam' to the south. Like many trade cities in the Western Sudan at the time, Silla was a city in two parts, split by the Senegal River.

The inhabitants of Silla may have been converted to Maliki Sunni Islam following war with Wagadu, who had asked the Almoravids for assistance, in the 1080s. Silla was eclipsed by Takrur in the 12th century.

Ibn Khaldun reported that Silla was a part of the Mali Empire in the 14th century.

In the Soninke epic Gassire's Lute, Silla is mentioned as a previous "appearance" of Wagadu.
