= Diarra, Mali =

Coordinates: 15°19′03″N 9°19′17″W

- Commune and town
- Interactive map of Diarra, Mali
- Country: Mali
- Region: Kayes Region
- Cercle: Nioro du Sahel Cercle
- Founded: late 11th century

Population (1998)
  - Total: 6,794
- Time zone: UTC+0 (GMT)

Diarra is a small town and commune in the Cercle of Nioro du Sahel in the Kayes Region of south-western Mali. In 1998, the commune had a population of 6794.

== History ==
Local histories recount that the village was founded by two brothers, Mana Maga and Fata Maga. They were starving, and Mana Maga gave some of his own flesh to his brother to keep him alive. His wound healed, and the place of convalescence was named 'Diara' meaning 'healing' in the Soninke language. It was founded in the aftermath of the 1076 Almoravid attack on the Wagadu Empire.

Diarra was for centuries the center of an eponymous kingdom, sometimes referred to as Kingui, ruled by the Niakhate and later Diawara clans.
