= Tunka Manin =

Ruler of the Ghana Empire beginning in 1063

Manin
- Tunka, Kaya Maghan, Ghana
- Reign: 1063-1076?
- Coronation: 1063
- Predecessor: Bassi
- Died: 1076?
- Dynasty: Cisse dynasty

Manin or Menin (c. 1010-c.1076) was a ruler of Wagadu, also known as the Ghana Empire, who was crowned in 1063 and possibly ruled until 1076. Preceded by Ghana Bassi, Manin was the last ruler of the Ghana Empire before the supposed Almoravid conquest. Accounts of Manin come from Al-Bakri who described him as a "lover of justice and favorable to Muslims". He calls him Tunka Manin, collating the Soninke title 'Tunka', meaning 'king', with a possible corruption of the name 'Manna'.

Manin succeeded his maternal uncle Bassi in 1063 on the throne and like him had maintained his traditional religion rather than converting to Islam. This succession may have followed longstanding matrilineal precedent, or may have been part of a political strategy to sideline Qanmar, Bassi's son, due to his Muslim faith. This in turn may have provided an opportunity for Almoravid intervention supporting pro-Islam candidates for the throne.

Scholars debate whether or not the Almoravids conquered Ghana in 1076, though if they did it likely came during Manin's reign, with the shift in power coming at his expense.
