= Koumbi Saleh =

- Site of medieval town and Commune
- Location within Mauritania
- Coordinates: 15°45′56″N 7°58′07″W
- Country: Mauritania

Area
  - Total: 1,484 km^{2} (573 sq mi)

Population (census 2023)
  - Total: 15,084
  - Density: 10.16/km^{2} (26.33/sq mi)
  - Ethnicities: Soninke

Koumbi Saleh, or Kumbi Saleh, is the site of a ruined ancient and medieval city in south east Mauritania that may have been the capital of the Ghana Empire. It is also a commune with a population of 15,084 (census 2023).

From the ninth century, Arab authors mention the Ghana Empire in connection with the trans-Saharan gold trade. Al-Bakri who wrote in the eleventh century described the capital of Ghana as consisting of two towns 10 kilometres (6 mi) apart, one inhabited by Muslim merchants, and the other by the king of Ghana. The discovery in 1913 of a 17th-century African chronicle that gave the name of the capital as Koumbi led French archaeologists to the ruins at Koumbi Saleh. Excavations at the site have revealed the ruins of a large Muslim town with houses built of stone and a congregational mosque but no inscription to unambiguously identify the site as that of capital of Ghana. Ruins of the king's town described by al-Bakri have not been found. Radiocarbon dating suggests that the site was occupied between the late 5th and 14th centuries, with the urban period extending approximately from the 11th to the 14th centuries.

== Arabic sources and the capital of the Ghana Empire ==
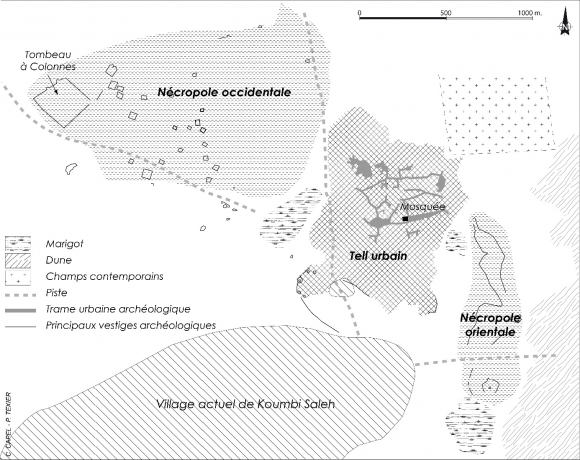
Archaeological site of Koumbi Saleh

The earliest author to mention Ghana is the Persian astronomer Ibrahim al-Fazari who, writing at the end of the eighth century, refers to "the territory of Ghana, the land of gold". The Ghana Empire lay in the Sahel region to the north of the West African gold fields and was able to profit from controlling the trans-Saharan gold trade. The early history of Ghana is unknown but there is evidence that North Africa had begun importing gold from West Africa before the Arab conquest in the middle of the seventh century.

In the medieval Arabic sources the word "Ghana" can refer to a royal title, the name of a capital city or a kingdom. The earliest reference to Ghana as a town is by al-Khuwarizmi who died in around 846 AD. Two centuries later a detailed description of the town is provided by al-Bakri in his Book of Routes and Realms which he completed in around 1068. Al-Bakri never visited the region but obtained his information from earlier writers and from informants that he met in his native Spain:

The city of Ghāna consists of two towns situated on a plain. One of these towns, which is inhabited by Muslims, is large and possesses twelve mosques, in one of which they assemble for Friday prayer. ... In the environs are wells with sweet water, from which they drink and with which they grow vegetables. The king's town is six miles [10 km] distant from this one and bears the name of Al-Ghāba. Between these two towns are continuous habitations. The houses of the inhabitants are of stone and acacia wood. The king has a palace and a number of domed dwellings all surrounded with an enclosure like a city wall. In the king's town, and not far from his courts of justice, is a mosque where Muslims who arrive in his court pray. Around the king's town are domed buildings and groves and thickets where the sorcerers of these people, men in charge of the religious cult, live.

The descriptions provided by the early Arab authors lack sufficient detail to pinpoint the exact location of the town. The much later 17th-century African chronicle, the Tarikh al-fattash, states that the Malian Empire was preceded by the Kayamagna dynasty which had a capital at a town called Koumbi. The chronicle does not use the word Ghana. The other important 17th-century chronicle, the Tarikh al-Sudan mentions that the Malian Empire came after the dynasty of Qayamagha which had its capital at the city of Ghana. It is assumed that the "Kayamagna" or "Qayamagha" dynasty ruled the empire of Ghana mentioned in the early Arabic sources.

== Contested identification ==
In recent years, the identification of Koumbi Saleh with the 'city of Ghana' described in the sources has been increasingly disputed by scholars. No inscription has been found to unambiguously link the ruins with the Muslim capital of Ghana described by al-Bakri. Moreover, the ruins of the king's town of Al-Ghaba have not been found.

Al-Idrisi, a 12th century writer, described Ghana's royal city as lying on a riverbank, a river he called the "Nile." This followed the geographic custom of his day, which confused the Niger and Senegal Rivers and believed that they formed a single river often called the "Nile of the Blacks". Whether al-Idrisi was referring to a new and later capital located elsewhere, or whether there was confusion or corruption in his text is unclear. However, he does state that the royal palace he knew was built in 510 AH (1116–1117 AD), suggesting that it was a newer town, rebuilt closer to the river than Koumbi Saleh. This has led to the suggestion that at some point the capital may have been moved south to the Niger River.

In the French translation of the Tarikh al-fattash published in 1913, Octave Houdas and Maurice Delafosse include a footnote in which they comment that local tradition also suggested that the first capital of Kayamagna was at Koumbi and that the town was in the Ouagadou region in Mali, northeast of Goumbou on the road leading from Goumbou to Néma and Oualata.

Ann Kritzinger, relying on a re-reading of ibn Battuta and other Arabic writers, has argued that the archaeological site of Koumbi Saleh in fact represents the Berber town of Awdaghost, and that the capital of the Ghana Empire was Djenne. According to the archaeologist Kevin MacDonald:

"Koumbi Saleh has a relatively sparse archaeological hinterland in an arid landscape, appearing to archaeological eyes as more of an Arab–Berber trade entrepôt than an indigenous capital. Indeed, Berthier’s (1997) excavations failed to locate ‘urbanized’ remains (i.e. earthen or stone buildings) dating before the late 11th century."

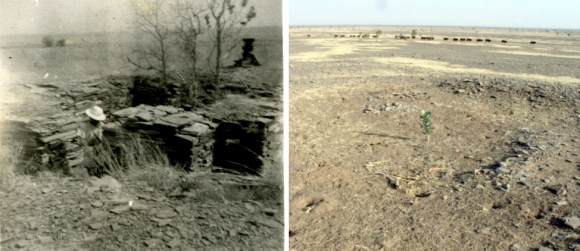
Central mausoleum in 1951 (left) and 2007 (right)

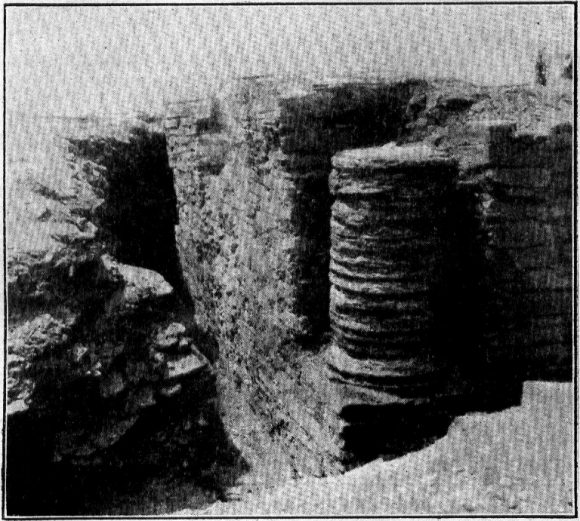
Column Tomb with remains of the corner columns still intact

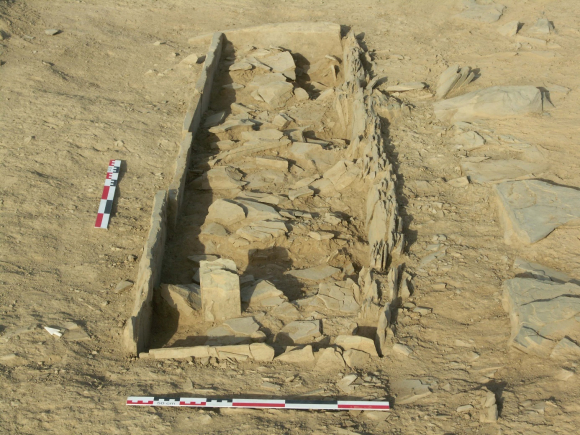
Individual burial from the Column Tomb with isolated stele placed at the head

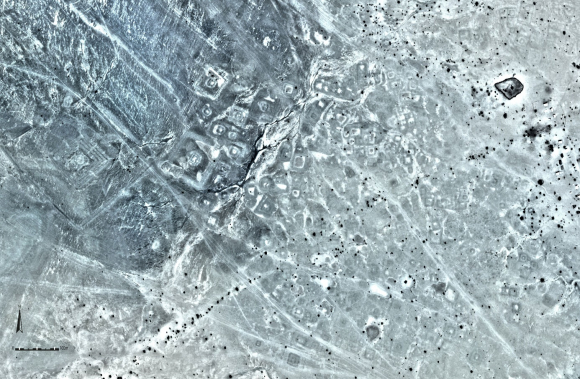
Western necropolis of Koumbi Saleh showing the density of funerary structures

== Archaeological site ==
Trade routes of the Western Sahara desert c. 1000–1500. Goldfields are indicated by light brown shading: Bambuk, Bure, Lobi, and Akan.

=== Dig history ===
The extensive ruins at Koumbi Saleh were first reported by Albert Bonnel de Mézières in 1914. The site lies in the Sahel region of southern Mauritania, 30 km north of the Malian border, 57 km south-southeast of Timbédra and 98 km northwest of the town of Nara in Mali. The vegetation is low grass with thorny scrub and the occasional acacia tree. In the wet season (July–September) the limited rain fills a number of depressions, but for the rest of the year there is no rain and no surface water.

Beginning with Bonnel de Mézières in 1914, the site has been excavated by successive teams of French archaeologists. Paul Thomassey and Raymond Mauny excavated between 1949 and 1951, Serge Robert during 1975-76 and Sophie Berthier during 1980–81.

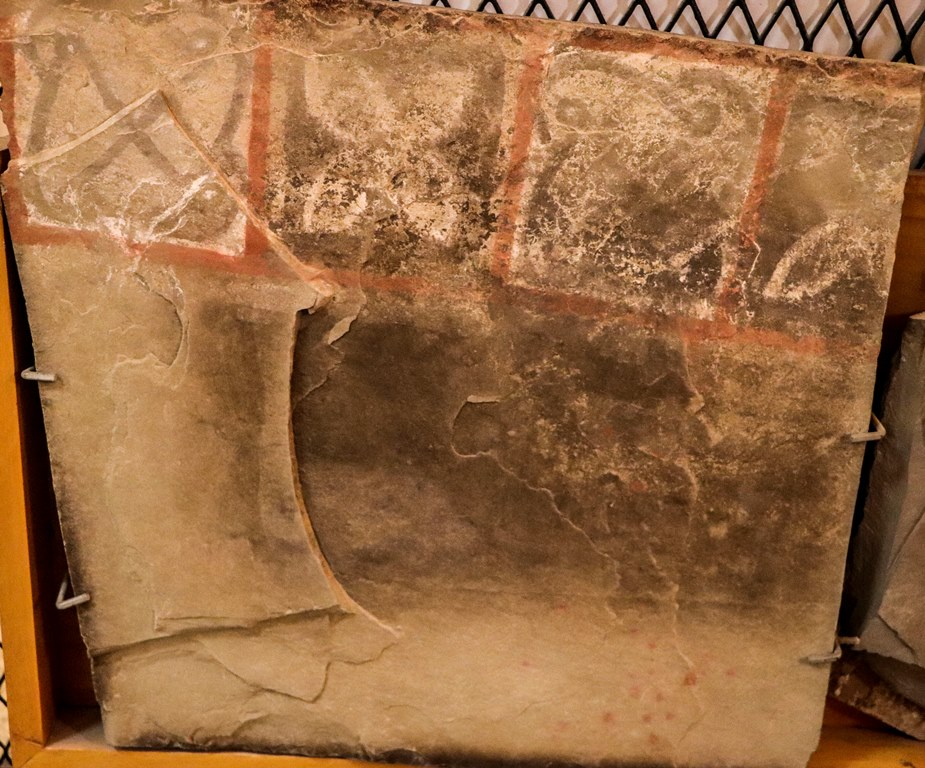
Epigraphic shale plate from Koumbi Saleh bearing religious formulae and geometric decorations exposed at the National Museum Nouakchott

=== Site description ===
The urban planning of Koumbi Saleh was complex and well-organized. Connah (2008) notes that the city was divided into two main areas: the royal palace and the commercial district. The palace was located on a raised platform and was surrounded by a moat. The commercial district consisted of a large central market and numerous smaller markets that specialized in specific goods. Insoll (1997) suggests that the layout of the city was influenced by Islamic urban planning principles, such as the use of mosques and the orientation of streets towards Mecca.

The main section of the town lay on a small hill that nowadays rises to about 15 m above the surrounding plain. The hill would have originally been lower as part of the present height is a result of the accumulated ruins. The houses were constructed from local stone (schist) using banco rather than mortar. From the quantity of debris it is likely that some of the buildings had more than one storey. The rooms were quite narrow, probably due to the absence of large trees to provide long rafters to support the ceilings. The houses were densely packed together and separated by narrow streets. In contrast a wide avenue, up to 12 m in width, ran in an east–west direction across the town. At the western end lay an open site that was probably used as a marketplace. The main mosque was centrally placed on the avenue. It measured approximately 46 m east to west and 23 m north to south. The western end was probably open to the sky. The mihrab faced due east. The upper section of the town covered an area of 700 m by 700 m. To the southwest lay a lower area (500 m by 700 m) that would have been occupied by less permanent structures and the occasional stone building. There were two large cemeteries outside the town suggesting that the site was occupied over an extended period. Radiocarbon dating of charcoal fragments from a house near the mosque have given dates that range between the late 5th and the 14th centuries, with the main period of urbanization extending from the 11th to the 14th centuries.

=== Interpretation ===
The archaeology of Koumbi Saleh provides insight into the urbanization process of one of the earliest West African states. According to Es'andah (1976), the city was either founded or greatly expanded upon in the 8th century AD with recent estimates in the last 2 decades of a possible foundation period as far back as the 2nd century to 1st century BC and as of the 8th century AD served as the primary epicenter of a vast trade network that spanned the Sahara Desert. Archaeological evidence suggests that the city was a hub for the exchange of gold, iron, salt, ivory, and other commodities. One of the most significant archaeological discoveries at Koumbi Saleh was the uncovering of large numbers of Islamic coins, ceramics, and glassware. This suggests that the city had extensive trading links with other Islamic regions such as North Africa, the Mediterranean, and the Middle East. The coins were minted in locations as far away as Baghdad, providing evidence of the far-reaching trade networks that once existed in West Africa.

The French archaeologist Raymond Mauny estimated that the town would have accommodated between 15,000 and 20,000 inhabitants, acknowledging that this is an enormous population for a town in the Sahara with a very limited supply of water ("Chiffre énorme pour une ville saharienne").

The archaeological excavations at Koumbi Saleh have provided valuable insights into the political, economic, and social structures of the Ghana Empire. The city's ruins and ancient artifacts have been recognized by UNESCO as a World Heritage Site, and ongoing research continues to shed light on the rich history of West Africa's ancient kingdoms.

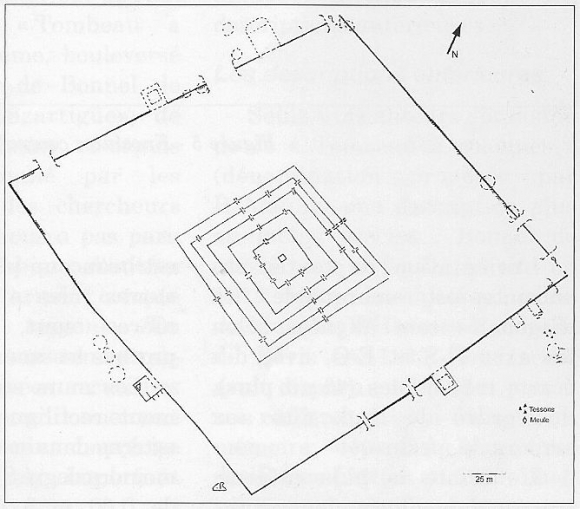
Funerary complex of the Column Tomb

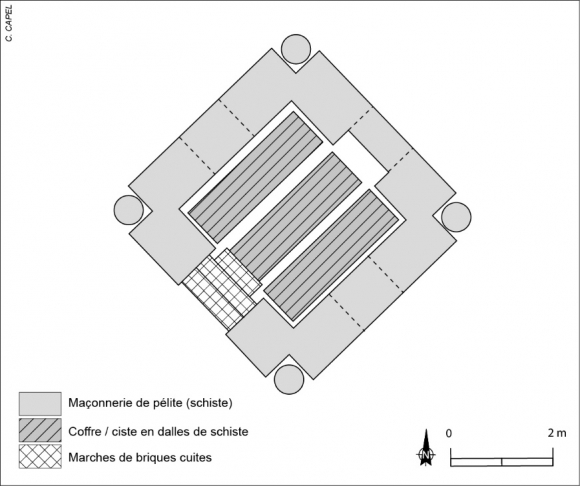
Central mausoleum (the qubba) of the Column Tomb

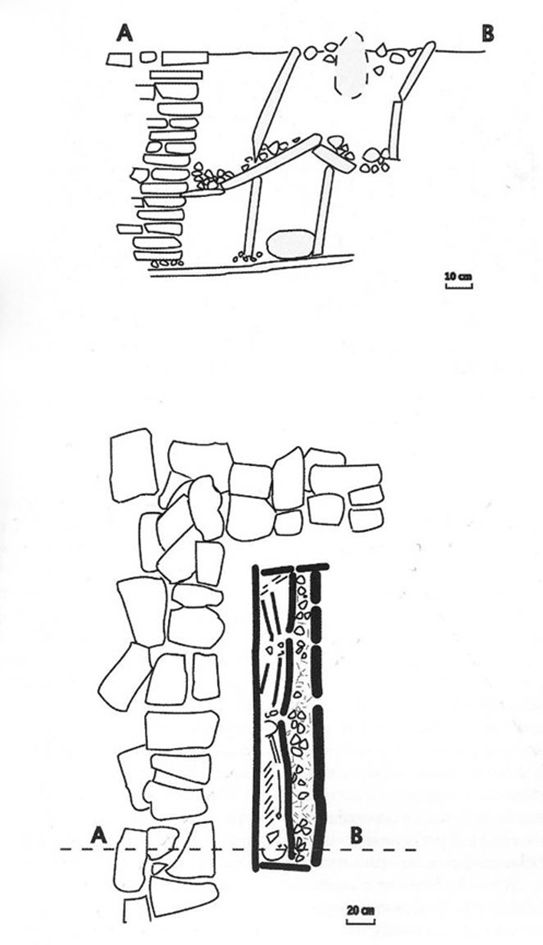
Burial excavation showing the over-pit system and surface arrangements

== World Heritage Status ==
The archaeological site was added to the UNESCO World Heritage Tentative List on June 14, 2001 in the Cultural category.
