= Maurice Delafosse =

French ethnographer and colonial official (1870–1926)

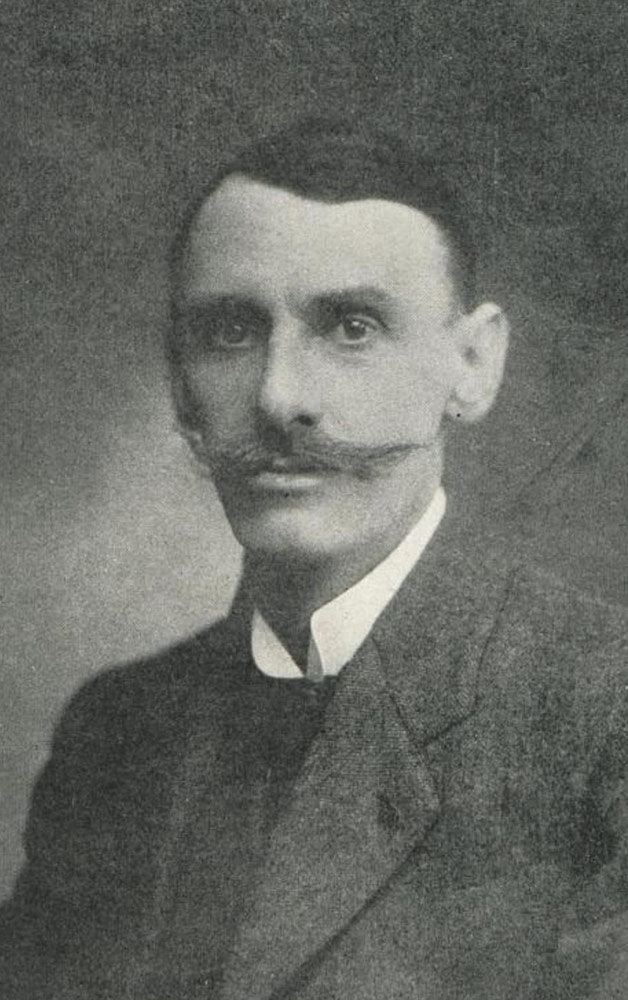
Delafosse in 1924

Maurice Delafosse (20 December 1870 – 13 November 1926) was a French ethnographer and colonial official who also worked in the field of the languages of Africa. In a review of his daughter's biography of him he was described as "one of the most outstanding French colonial administrators and ethnologists of his time."

== Career ==
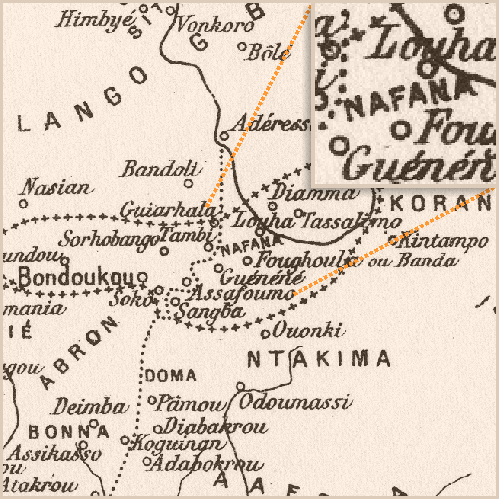
Fragment of Delafosse's (1904) linguistic map highlighting Nafaanra ('Nafana') in the borderland of Côte d'Ivoire and Ghana.

Delafosse was born on 20 December 1870 in the village of Sancergues in central France. He was the son of René Françoise Célestin Delafosse and Elise Marie Bidault and had five siblings.

Delafosse is known for his contributions to West African history and African languages. He began his study of Arabic in 1890 at the École des langues orientales with the renowned orientalist, Octave Houdas. He traveled to Algeria in 1891 with the Frères armés du Sahara, a Catholic organization concerned with combating the Trans-Saharan slave trade. Shortly afterwards, he spent one year in the French military as a zouave, second class, before returning to his formal studies at the École des langues orientales. After receiving his diploma, he was appointed as an assistant to Indigenous Affairs in the new French colony of Côte d'Ivoire. For a period the future ethnologist Charles Monteil was his assistant in the Côte d'Ivoire.

Delafosse had disagreements with the French government over the administration of French Africa, and, as a result, was "more or less banned from the colonies" for a large part of his life.

He served as one of the seven members of the Temporary Slavery Commission of the League of Nations in 1924–1925.

== Selected publications ==
- Hubert, Lucien; Delafosse, Maurice (1894), Tombouctou, son histoire, sa conquête (in French), Paris: Guillaumin.
- Delafosse, Maurice (1894), Manuel dahoméen : grammaire, chrestomathie, dictionnaire français-dahoméen et dahoméen-français (in French), Paris: E. Leroux.
- Delafosse, Maurice (1897), Essai sur le peuple et la langue sara (bassin du Tchad) (in French), Paris: J. André. Also available from the Internet Archive here.
- Delafosse, Maurice (1899), Les Vaï: leur langue et leur système d'écriture (in French), Paris: Masson. Also available from the Internet Archive here.
- Delafosse, Maurice (1901), Essai de manuel pratique de la langue mandé ou mandingue : étude grammaticale du dialecte dyoula, vocabulaire français-dyoula... étude comparée des principaux dialectes mandé (in French), Paris: E. Leroux. Also available from the Internet Archive here.
- Delafosse, Maurice (1901), Manuel de langue haoussa ou Chrestomathie haoussa; précédé d'un abrégé de grammaire et suivi d'un vocabulaire (in French), Paris: J. Maisonneuve.
- Delafosse, Maurice (1904), Vocabulaires comparatifs de plus de 60 langues ou dialectes parlés à la Côte d'Ivoire et dans les régions limitrophes (in French), Paris: E. Leroux. Also available from the Internet Archive here.
- Delafosse, Maurice (1908), Les frontières de la Côte d'Ivoire, de la Côte d'Or, et du Soudan, Paris: Masson. Also available from the Open Library.
- Delafosse, Maurice (1912), Haut-Sénégal-Niger: Le Pays, les Peuples, les Langues; l'Histoire; les Civilizations. 3 Vols (in French), Paris: Émile Larose. Gallica: Volume 1, Le Pays, les Peuples, les Langues; Volume 2, L'Histoire; Volume 3, Les Civilisations.
- Houdas, Octave; Delafosse, Maurice, eds. (1913), Tarikh el-fettach par Mahmoūd Kāti et l'un de ses petit fils (2 Vols.), Paris: Ernest Leroux. Volume 1 is the Arabic text, Volume 2 is a translation into French. Reprinted by Maisonneuve in 1964 and 1981. The French text is also available from Aluka but requires a subscription.
- Delafosse, Maurice (1916), "La question de Ghana et la Mission Bonnel de Mézières", Annuaire et Mémoires du Comité d'Études historiques et scientifique de l'AOF (in French): 40–61
- Delafosse, Maurice (1922), Les Noirs de l'Afrique (in French), Paris: Payot. Also available from the Internet Archive here.
- Delafosse, Maurice (1922), L'âme nègre (in French), Paris: Payot.
- Delafosse, Maurice (1927), Les nègres (in French), Paris: Rieder, archived from the original on 2017-09-07.
- Delafosse, Maurice (1928), "La numération chez les Nègres", Africa: Journal of the International African Institute (in French), 1 (3): 387–390, doi:10.2307/1155640, JSTOR 1155640.

== Sources ==
- Arnaut, Karel (2000). "Review of: Amselle, Jean-Loup & Sibeud, Emmanuelle, eds. — Maurice Delafosse. Entre orientalisme et ethnographie : l'itinéraire d'un africaniste (1870-1926). Paris, Maisonneuve & Larose, 1998". Cahiers d'Études africaines. 157: 141–143.
- Cohen, William B. (1978). "Review of: Maurice Delafosse, le Berrichon Conquis par l'Afrique by Louise Delafosse, Paris: Société Française d'Histoire d'Outre-Mer". International Journal of African Historical Studies. 11 (2): 302–305. doi:10.2307/217447. JSTOR 217447.
- Delafosse, Louise (1976). Maurice Delafosse: le Berrichon conquis par l'Afrique (in French). Paris: Société Française d'Histoire d'Outre-mer. ISBN 978-2-85970-000-3. A biography by his daughter.
- Dulucq, Sophie (2009). Ecrire l'histoire de l'Afrique à l'époque coloniale: XIXe-XXe siècles (in French). Karthala Editions. ISBN 978-2-8111-0290-6.
