= Research in African Literatures =

- Discipline: Literature
- Language: English
- Edited by: Kwaku Larbi Korang

Publication details
- History: 1970-present
- Publisher: Indiana University Press (United States)
- Frequency: Quarterly

Standard abbreviations
- ISO 4: Res. Afr. Lit.

Indexing
- ISSN: 0034-5210 (print); 1527-2044 (web)
- LCCN: 72224835
- JSTOR: reseafrilite
- OCLC no.: 924728175

Links
- Journal homepage; Journal access at Project MUSE

Research in African Literatures is a triannual peer-reviewed academic journal covering African literary studies. It was established in 1970 and is published by Indiana University Press. The editor-in-chief is Kwaku Larbi Korang (Ohio State University).

== Abstracting and indexing ==
The journal is abstracted and indexed in:

- Arts & Humanities Citation Index
- Current Contents/Arts & Humanities
- EBSCO databases
- ProQuest databases
