= Kingdom of Diarra =

Kingdom in Mali, 1054 to 1860

Diarra
- 1054–1860
- Capital: Diarra, Mali
- Common languages: Soninke language
- Religion: Traditional African Religion
- History
  - Established: 1054
  - Conquered by Elhadj Omar Saido Tall: 1860
- Currency: Cowries
Preceded by	Succeeded by
Ghana Empire	Toucouleur Empire

Diarra, also referred to as Kingui, Diafunu, or Kaniaga, was a Soninke state in what is now northwestern Mali, centered around the town of Diarra. Founded in the 11th century, it was occasionally independent but frequently under the domination of a series of Sahelian empires until its final destruction by the Toucouleur Empire in the 19th century.

== Names ==
The kingdom has many different names, which are used in different contexts. Diarra (also spelled Jaara or Zara) is the name of the capital, and so applied to the state as a whole. Kingui is the Pulaar term for the region. Kaniaga is a Soninke term for land between the upper Senegal River and the Niger bend, derived from a Malinke term which means 'north'; it is sometimes applied to Diarra, and sometimes to the Sosso Empire, as both were located to the north of the Manding region. Diafunu is a region west of the town of Diarra that paid tribute to the kingdom.

== History ==
Aoudaghost, a royal seat of the Ghana Empire (Wagadou), was captured by the Almoravid Empire in the second half of the 11th century, at which time Sain Demba, capital of Diafunu was supposedly destroyed and the city of Diarra was built. The Mana Maga, as the kings of Diarra were known, broke away and established an independent state under the Niakhate dynasty. The kingdom became wealthy through trans-Saharan trade, controlling much of the southern parts of the former Wagadu (Ghana) Empire, and conquering Takrur. Arabic written sources mention a kingdom named Zafunu, whose authority extended into the desert and beyond in this period. This is a transliteration of Diafunu, but may refer to the kingdom of Diarra.

Diarra fell under the Sosso Empire and the Mali Empire beginning in the early 13th century. The Niakhate dynasty, however, gained a reputation for cruelty and tyranny. In the early 15th century the last Mana Maga of the dynasty, Seriba Niakhaté, was driven out or fled Diarra for the area around Bamako, leaving power to Daman Guilé Diawara, a renowned hunter originally from Mande. Under the new dynasty Diarra thrived as a center for the caravan trade, charting a course increasingly independent of Malian influence. Daman Guilé Diawara was succeeded as king by his son Kouria Mamadou, who took the title 'Faren,' meaning 'governor,' who was followed by his son Silamaghan. After Silamaghan's death the country was divided between his sons, who frequently fought amongst each other.

In 1501 the Songhai Empire conquered the Malian province of Diafunu, to the south of Diarra proper. The Fula warlord Tenguella invaded Diarra in 1511, at which point the kingdom called for help from the Songhai Empire. Umar Komajago, a brother of the Askia Mohammad I, led a powerful force on a 2-month march through the desert, then in 1512 defeated and killed Tenguella in battle. After this, Diarra likely swore fealty to the Songhai.

In 1754, the Bambara kingdom of Kaarta conquered and vassalized the kingdom.

The last monarch of Diarra, Biranté Karounga Diawara, was captured and executed by Omar Saidou Tall on May 31, 1860.
