= Guidimakha =

Guidimakha, sometimes spelled Gidimaxa, was a Soninke dyamare (chiefdom or confederacy) in what is now southern Mauritania and western Mali. The Soninke presence in the region, particularly in the valleys of the Assaba Massif, dates back to the Tichitt period in the 1st millennium BC. Guidimakha itself was older than the neighboring, and much better known, Wagadu Empire. It was founded by the legendary ancestor Maxam Malle Duho, ancestor of the Soumare clan. Guidimakha did eventually become part of Wagadu. The Moors drove the Kamara clan en masse out of their home in the Tagant Plateau and into Guidimakha, where they eventually overwhelmed the Sumare by force of numbers and took the title of Tunka (king).
