= Epic of Bamana Segu =

Epic of Bamana Segu (or Epic of Bambara Segu) is one of the longest epics recorded in Africa. The epic was composed by Bambara people in the 19th century. The epic reflects on political and military events which occurred during the reign of three rulers of the second dynasty of Segu Bambara State: Ngolo Diarra, his son Monzon Diarra and grandson Da Monzon Diarra.

The epic became a part of Bambara oral tradition and was continuously performed by Malian griots. Among prominent performers of the epic was Banzumana Sissoko. The epic was first recorded in the 20th century, first published in French in 1972, and subsequently in English in 1990.
