= Sultanate of Massina =

Sultanate in West Africa

- Capital: Keke, then Ouronguia
- Common languages: Maasina Fulfulde
- Fondoko, Ardo Mawdo
  - c. 1400: Maghani
  - 1801-1818: Hamadi-Diko
- History
  - Established: c. 1400
  - Battle of Noukouma: 1818
Preceded by	Succeeded by
Mema; Mali Empire	Massina Empire
- Today part of: Mali

The Sultanate of Massina was a state covering much of the Inner Niger Delta in what is now Mali. From its founding around 1400 CE, it was generally a tributary of larger states, including the Mali Empire (14th century), the Songhai Empire (15th-16th centuries), the Arma (Moroccan) pashas of Tomboctou (17th century), and the Segou Empire (18th century). In 1818 the Sultanate was overthrown by a jihad led by Ahmadu Lobbo, who established the Caliphate of Hamdullahi.

== Etymology ==
There are multiple theories for the origin of the name 'Massina'. One is that it was the name of a lake close to Keke, the first capital of the Sultanate near modern-day Tenenkou. Alternatively, 'Massina' could be related to the Imasna, an Afro-Berber group and the oldest ethnic strata within the population of Tichitt. 'Maasina' is an old Fula term for the Dhar Tichitt-Walata-Néma region in the Aoukar basin.

== History ==
Fulani pastoralists began to enter the Inner Niger Delta in the 13th century, during the heyday of the Mali Empire, coming from the old Maasina. Circa 1400 a group arrived from the Termess region, part of Kaniaga. They were led by Maghani, who brought his followers southeast after a dispute with his brother the sultan. They were welcomed by the Baghana-fari, governor of Bakhounou, and allowed to settle in the region between Mema and the Niger River. The Fula clans that migrated were the Jallobe and later the Sangare.

=== Under the Songhai ===
During the reign of Alioun II (1466–1480), Sonni Ali attacked Massina but was unable to subdue it. In 1494 Demba Dondi, brother of the reigning Fondoko Nia, allied with the Mali Empire against the Songhai, but was killed. Under Nia's rule Songhai authority was extended over Massina, and he transferred his capital from Keke to the Guimbala region. The Massina-mondyo was in charge of collecting taxes and tribute in the region on behalf of the Askia, and ensuring the loyalty of the leaders.

In 1582, brigands from Massina attacked a flotilla of boats belonging to the Songhai prince Al-Hajj, pillaging his belongings. Al-Hajj's older brother, Kurmina-fari Muhammad Benkan, devastated the region in revenge, killing many prominent Muslim clerics. The reigning Askia Daoud died soon after. Fondako Bubu Maryam was accused of plotting against the new Askia, Al-Hajj, and taken to Gao. He managed to convince the Askia of his loyalty, but remained in the capital to serve the ruler personally. Hammad-Amina was named Fondako in his place. Bubu Maryam would eventually die at the Battle of Tondibi in 1591.

=== Under the Arma ===
After Songhai's fall to the Moroccan invaders, Hammad-Amina had to navigate complicated and dangerous political waters. When Djenne came under attack from the Baghana-fari Bukar, he aided the Moroccans in suppressing the city's revolt and repelling the resistance. In late 1598, the Moroccan Pasha arrested the family of a prominent Islamic scholar who had been killed by the Moroccan troops. Hammad-Amina came to Timbuktu to try and intercede on their behald, but was himself arrested and imprisoned for a period. Upon his return home, he began ignoring Moroccan demands, and so a force of Arma arquebusiers, supported by the army of the puppet Askia, marched on Massina. Hammad-Amina recruited an army of Bambara mercenaries, but were defeated at Thulu Fina. Much of the fondako's family fell into Moroccan hands, but he and his generals managed to retreat to Diarra.

In April 1599, Mansa Mahmud IV of the Mali Empire, looking to take advantage of the chaos in the Niger river valley, attacked Djenne, with Hammad-Amina supporting him. Although the Malians were defeated, the victors focused on punishing the king of N'Goa, leaving Hammad-Amina free to find reinforcements. He defeated the Djenne garrison and the forces of his nephew, who the Arma had put in charge of Massina, at Tiyi, and forced them to accept his return to the throne.

In 1610 the Songhai government in exile made another stab at dislodging the Arma. Dendi-fari Bukar won a series of battles and made significant gains in Massina, prompting a series of rebellions against Moroccan rule in nearby cities. The fondoko refused to join in, though the region suffered heavily from Moroccan reprisals nevertheless.

In 1627, Hamadou-Amina II became ardo and two years later refused to submit to the Moroccans. The Moroccan pasha led a military expedition against the Fulbe, but was defeated by Hamadou-Amina's guerilla tactics. He agreed to recognize Hamadou-Amina II as ardo if he would pay tribute, but the latter refused. In 1644, another pasha invaded. Hamadou-Amina won a victory at Saye, but was defeated and forced to flee. After rebuilding his forces he returned to defeated his cousin, who the Moroccans had installed as ardo, and ruled until 1663.

=== Under the Bambara ===
In the early 1700s, Biton Coulibaly conquered Massina and brought it under the sway of the Bambara Segou Empire. Over time the common people came to increasingly resent the combined oppression of the Bambara, the Fula warlords, and the religious elite in Djenne. Charismatic preacher Ahmadu Lobbo used this discontent to build up a large base of support. In 1817 the authorities attempted to expel him from Djenne. One of Lobbo's followers encountered Giɗaaɗo, son of the ruling Arɗo mawdo Aamadu, in a market, who insulted him. Another follower returned to the market the next week, and when Giɗaaɗo refused to apologize, killed him. This set off a civil war in Massina.

Ardo Amadu sought the support of Da Monzon Diarra, faama of Segou, and Gelaajo, the pereejo (chief) of the Sidibe military aristocracy of Kounari. On March 21st 1818, the Segou army attacked Lobbo's small force before their allies arrived and were defeated. The victory massively boosted Lobbo's prestige and recruitment, and paralyzed the Massina aristocracy. Lobbo had taken control of Massina by mid-May 1818, founding the Caliphate of Hamdullahi.

== Government ==
The Arma had little interest or capacity to govern the middle Niger valley, and left most affairs to the local leaders. In Massina, this meant Fulbe warlords known as ardo'en (sing.: ardo). The ardo mawdo functioned as the Sultan of Massina, hailed from the Dikko clan, and was based in Ouro Ngiya near Lake Debo.

=== Rulers ===
Time period	Person	Notes
c. 1400–1404	Maga Diallo	Founded Diallo dynasty.
1404–1424	Ibrahim	
1424–1433	Alioun	
1433–1466	Kanta	
1466–1480	Alioun II	
1480–1510	Nia Macina	Massina annexed by Songhay in 1494.
1510–1539	Soudi	
1539–1540	Ilo	Civil war.
1540–1543	Hamadou-Siré	Removed by Askia Ishaq I.
1543–1544	Hamadou-Pullo	
1544–1551	Boubou-Ilo	Revolt of the Fulbe of Nampala.
1551–1559	Ibrahim-Boyé	
1559–1583	Boubou Mariama	Accused of rebellion.
1583–1603	Hamadou-Amina	Moroccan invasion of western Sudan.
1603–1613	Boubou-Aissata	
1613–1625	Ibrahim-Boyé	
1625–1627	Silamaga-Aissata	
1627–1663	Hamadou-Amina II	Revolted against Moroccans.
1663–1673	Alioun III	Moroccans reassert control.
1673–1675	Gallo-Haoua	
1675–1696	Gourori	
1696–1706	Gueladio	
1706–1761	Guidado	
1761–1780	Hamadou-Amina III	
1780–1801	Ya-Gallo	
1801–1818	Hamadi-Diko	Overthrown by Ahmadu Lobbo
