= Boidie =

Coordinates: 13°12′48″N 6°56′29″W

- Commune and town
- Interactive map of Boidie
- Country: Mali
- Region: Ségou Region
- Cercle: Barouéli Cercle
- Elevation: 1,020 ft (311 m)

Population (1998)
  - Total: 17,645
- Time zone: UTC+0 (GMT)

Boidie or Boadie is a small town and commune in the Cercle of Barouéli in the Ségou Region of southern-central Mali. In 1998 the commune had a population of 17,645.It has an elevation of 311 meters above sea level.

The town was the seat of a minor kingdom ruled by kings from the Traore family, installed in the region of Dô by Biton Coulibaly, faama of the Segou Empire.
