= Battle of Madiongo =

- Part of the jihad of Seku Amadu
Date	1827
Location	Madiongo
Result	Massina Empire victory

Belligerents
Massina Empire	Bambara Empire -Bambara state of Saro

Commanders and leaders
Goura Malado Amirou Mangal (Dienné reinforcements)	Falé Tangala of Ndokoro

Strength
Unknown	Total : 11,500+ 10,000 infantrymen 1,500 cavalrymen

Casualties and losses
Heavy	Heavy (army captured)

The Battle of Madiongo was fought between in 1827 as part of the Jihad of Seku Amadu. It was fought between the forces of the Massina Empire and troops from the state of Saro allied to the Bamana Empire.

Following the Bamana Empire disastrous defeat at the battle of Noukouma, the King of Ségou, Da Monzon Diarra began to be particularly anxious about the rising power of the Fulani jihadists in the Macina. He assembled his chiefs of war in his residence and they tried to discuss about a strategy to defeat the Fulanis, they talked for six entire days and each new day they were more divided about the strategy to adopt than the one before. Da Diarra exasperated proposed to find someone else to deal with the Fulanis: "The Peul affair smells bad," he told his advisors. "We need to get rid of it by sending someone else in our place. Let each of you think until tomorrow about the means capable of winning Tyon, son of Saro Masa, and his war chiefs to our cause." A big delegation from Segu was sent to Saro and an alliance was formed, Falé Tangala of Ndokoro, a war chief of Tyon was designated to attack the Massina Empire.

== Battle ==
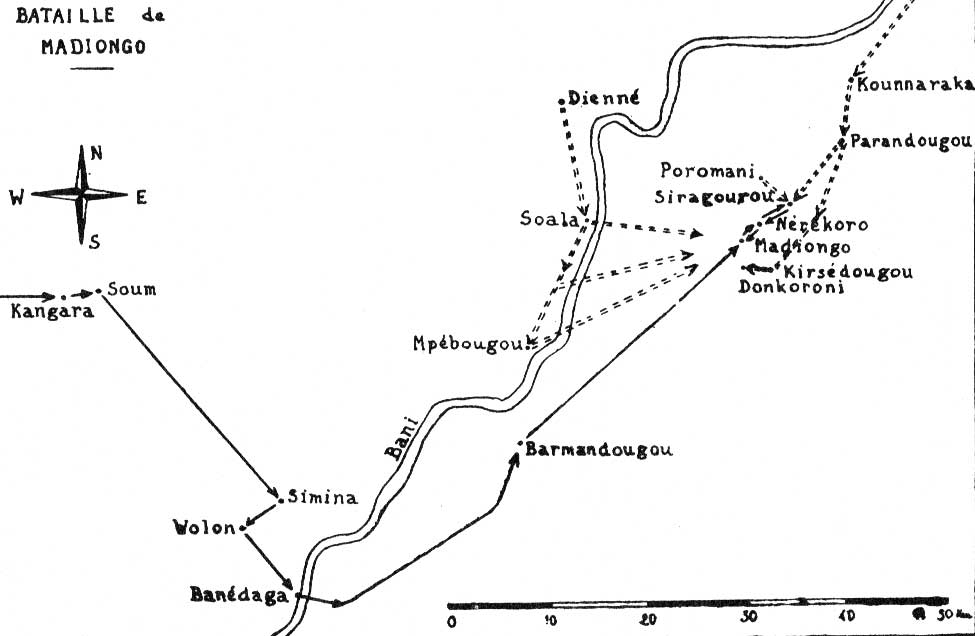
Battle of madiongo

Falé Tangala with a big contingent of Bambara troops from Segu and Saro marched against the Fulanis. He left Saro by Kangara, made provisions in the region of Soum and camped in Simina. With his army he traversed the Bani and marched on Barmandougou, Seku Amadu was informed of the enemy movements and a column was sent against Falé Tangala. Goura Malado who was patrolling the Fakala received orders to meet the enemy forces and a contingent from Hamdallay under Abdoukarim was dispatched and joined forces with Goura Malado at Kounnaraka, where was camping the Fulani Army. Falé Tangala convinced that the Fulanis had fled decided to camp at Madiongo, in the objective of razzier and pillaging the entire region of Poromani. Goura Malado sent a letter to Dienné asking Amirou Mangal to cut the retreat of the Bambara army, at the night a well-armed column left Dienné. Goura Malado decided to move in Poromani, on the way at Parandougou, he captured some Bambara soldiers who were pillaging and interrogated them, with the intel obtained he convened a war council and decided to modify his initial plan: Instead of proceeding directly to Poromani, where a garrison stood ready for any eventuality, he proposed an alternative route. His plan involved marching forcefully toward Kirsédougou, deploying shock troops along the entire path, attacking the Bambara from the flank, and driving them into the uninhabited marshy areas on the right bank of the Bani River. The Fulanis were encircling the bambara army, in Siragourou a portion of the Bambara army stationed there was already under attack. Realising the danger, Falé Tangala started to be worried and organised his defences in madiongo, all the bambara forces retranched in madiongo, the Massina troops from Dienné then started traversing the Bani and converged on madiongo, the battle was already raging for more than three days when they arrived. The exhausted men of Gouro Malado and those from Fallada, worn down by the march and numerous engagements, began to falter. With each sortie, Falé sowed death among the Peul ranks. He planted the heads of his victims in the ground, and their number reached several dozen when fresh troops from Dienné arrived. Madiongo was completely surrounded and assailed. During the battle a Fulani man named Guidado Modi Ali and a group of cavalrymen captured Falé Tangala, knowing his cause lost, he ordered his men to surrender.

== Aftermath ==
The prisoners and war booty were sent to Hamdallay, and the military tribunal condemned Falé Tangala to death. Before carrying out the sentence, the great council invited him to embrace Islam to save his life, but he proudly rejected the offer. The Bambara chiefs faced a choice: convert to Islam or face execution. All their men were to be executed as an example to discourage other Bambara states. However, thanks to the intervention of Ibrahima Amirou and Kembou Boubou, the prisoners were ransomed using the state treasury. They converted, were liberated, and granted land in the present-day Dérari region. These loyal individuals became precious auxiliaries of the Massina Empire.
