= Ali Coulibaly =

Ali Coulibaly (r. 1757 – c. 1759) was a king of the Bambara Empire of Ségou.

Son of empire founder Bitòn Coulibaly and brother to the previous king, Dinkoro Coulibaly, Ali took the throne following his brother's assassination. A devout Muslim, he attempted to convert his largely animist Bambara subjects. Ali became widely unpopular for his interference with local religious practices and his ban on millet beer, and was overthrown. His death triggered a decade of instability in the Bambara Empire until the 1766 ascension of Ngolo Diarra to the throne.
