= Barouéli =

- Commune and town
- Location in Mali
- Coordinates: 13°04′N 6°50′W
- Country: Mali
- Region: Ségou Region
- Cercle: Barouéli Cercle

Population (1998)
  - Total: 32,739
- Time zone: UTC+0 (GMT)

Barouéli is a town and commune and seat of the Cercle of Barouéli in the Ségou Region of southern-central Mali. In 1998 the commune had a population of 32,739.

== Administration ==
Barouéli is directly south of Ségou Cercle, and directly north of Koulikoro Cercle.

The Commune of Barouéli is composed of the town of Barouéli and forty surrounding villages, with an estimated population of 47000 in 2001 (15000 in Barouéli proper).

The Cercle of Barouéli contains the Communes of Barouéli, Boidié, Dougoufié, Guendo, Kalaké, Konobougou, N’Gassola, Sanando, Somo, Tamani and Tesserla.

== History ==
Baroueli was founded as a trading center by the Marka people in the 19th century. It was the site of the largest Hausa zongo in the region, due to its location at the intersection of a riverine trade route linking Bamako and Timbuktu on one hand with the overland route from Segou to Nioro and the Senegal River valley on the other.

Once located in the center of the Bambara Empire, the area's population today is overwhelmingly Bambara. The town's football club AS Bakaridjan de Barouéli, plays in the top level Malien Premiere Division.

== Environmental resources ==
It contains the forests of Barouéli, Tamani, and Boidié, which have come under pressure from overexploitation.

== Sister city ==
Vannes, France
