= Eugène Dervain =

Martinican-Ivorian playwright, lawyer and judge (1928–2010)

- Born: Émile Eugène André Dervain; February 4, 1928; Saint-Esprit, Martinique

Emile Eugène André Dervain (February 4, 1928 –2010) was a Martinican-Ivorian playwright, lawyer and judge.

== Life ==
Émile Eugène André Dervain was born on February 4, 1928, in Saint-Esprit in central Martinique. He married a woman from the west of the Ivory Coast, and was naturalized as Ivorian in 1967.

Dervain's Saran ou la Reine scélérate (1968) was a historical play set in the early nineteenth century, in Da Monzon's semi-legendary rule over the kingdom of Ségou, and drawing on oral epic tradition. A prologue invoked classical precedent:

The company that plays for you this evening wanted an African play to be written for them. And the author followed the Classical example. He drew on legend, but instead of seeing Ismene, Antigone or Creon debating Attic problems, you will see Queen Saran in love with a handsome prince, as only the women of Ségou know how to love. It is only a first attempt, but the store of legend is rich: we have our Cid, our Ruy Blas, our Curiace...

Dervain's 1969 one-act play Abra Pokou was based on Queen Pokou, the mythical founder of the Baoulé people of the Ivory Coast.

Trained as a lawyer, Dervain became a barrister at the Court of First Instance in Abidjan. From 1986 to 1988, he was president of the Bar Association in Abidjan. Dervain went on to serve as judge, prosecutor and investigating judge at the Court of First Instance. He was also President of the Côte d'Ivoire section of Amnesty International, and a member of the Academy of Sciences, Arts, African Cultures and African Diasporas (ASCAD).

== Works ==
- Saran: ou, La reine scélérate & La langue et le scorpion; pièces en trois et quatre actes [Saran: or, the villainous queen and The tongue and the scorpion: plays in three or four acts]. Yaoundé, Éditions Clé, 1968.
- Abra Pokou; pièce en un acte [Queen Pokou: a play in one act], Yaoundé: Éditions CLE, 1969.
- Termites: théâtre. Paris: P.J. Oswald, 1976.
- Une vie lisse et cruelle: poèmes [A smooth and cruel life: poems]. Abidjan: Edilis, 1999.
