= Triumph of the Human Spirit =

Sculpture in Manhattan, New York, U.S.

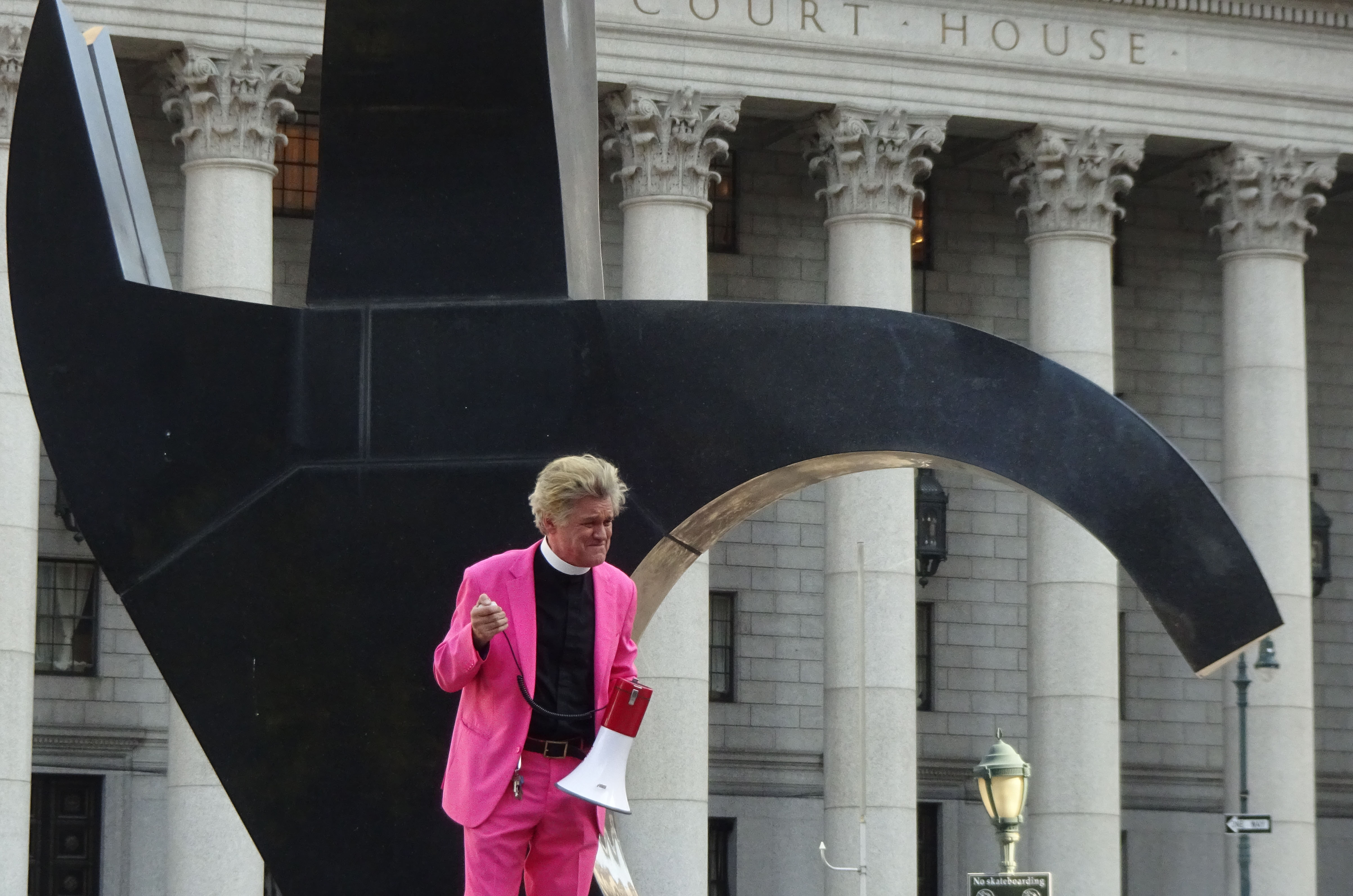
- The sculpture at Foley Square in 2022
- Artist: Lorenzo Pace
- Year: 2000
- Type: Sculpture
- Medium: Black granite
- Location: New York City, New York, United States; 40.71445°N 74.00289°W

Triumph of the Human Spirit is a 2000 black granite sculpture by Lorenzo Pace, installed at Manhattan's Foley Square, in the U.S. state of New York. According to the City of New York, the 50-foot-high (15.2 m), 300-short-ton (272.2 t), abstract monument is derived from the female antelope Chiwara forms of Bambaran art. The sculpture is sited near a rediscovered Colonial-era African Burial Ground, and its support structure alludes to the slave trade's Middle Passage. Following the 1991 discovery of the African Burial Ground, the work was commissioned by the New York City Government program Percent for Art. The work was dedicated on Columbus Day (October 12), 2000. Pace feels that Columbus Day is an inappropriate date to celebrate his "work that honors the slaves, immigrants, and Indians who were wronged in this nation's formative years." He and other African-Americans boycotted the unveiling because of the Columbus Day date, which was chosen as a rare day in which both New York City Mayor Rudy Giuliani and United States Senator Daniel Patrick Moynihan could synch their availability. The work was commissioned for $750,000 ($1.72 million in 2025), but took 8 years (including two rejections) to complete. The sculpture has received a lot of notoriety as a gathering place for demonstrations and rallies.

== See also ==
- 2000 in art
- African Burial Ground National Monument, Lower Manhattan
