= Lorenzo Pace =

American sculptor

Lorenzo Pace (born 1943) is an American artist best known for his African Burial Ground Memorial sculpture in New York City, Triumph of the Human Spirit.

== Biography ==
Pace, who had 12 siblings, was born in Birmingham, Alabama, where his father was a minister in the Church of God in Christ. He spent his youth in Chicago, except for a year spent abroad studying in Paris. By the time he returned to Chicago, he was determined to become an artist and soon was inspired by a wood carving of the Last Supper to pursue that specialty.

Pace had his first exhibition at the South Side Community Art Center, where a University of Illinois at Chicago (UIC) dean lured him to the UIC art school with a full scholarship. After one year there, he transferred to the School of the Art Institute of Chicago (SAIC), again on a scholarship, where he attained Bachelor of Fine Arts and Master of Fine Arts degrees.

He attended the Illinois State University’s (ISU) School of Art in Normal, Illinois after being introduced to chairman Fred Mills by SAIC president Donald Irving. At the outset of his dissertation defense, Pace performed a flute concerto by candlelight. Under thesis advisor Max Rennels, he obtained his doctorate in art education from ISU in 1978. After teaching at UIC, he moved to New York City where he became part of the Harlem arts community. Pace has also taught at Medgar Evers College and served as director of the Montclair State University art galleries, a position he was first appointed to in 1988.

In 2000, his black granite abstract monument, Triumph of the Human Spirit, was dedicated; it had been commissioned eight years earlier and rejected twice along the way. It was funded by New York City's Percent for Art to be the centerpiece of Foley Square in Lower Manhattan and as a memorial to the nearby rediscovered African burial ground located at what is now known as African Burial Ground National Monument. The top-level crown is based on the Chiwara female antelope forms in Bambaran art. The middle-level long form represents the Middle Passage slaves endured in the Atlantic slave trade. At the front, a replica of Pace's forefather Steve Pace's slave lock, a family heirloom, is embedded into the work.

Pace has exhibited at the Birmingham Civil Rights Institute in Birmingham, Alabama, as well as galleries in Brazil, China, France, Peru, Senegal, and Suriname.

Pace is also the author of Jalani and the Lock, a children's book which tells the story behind his ancestor's captive restraint which became a familial keepsake.

Pace works at the University of Texas Rio Grande Valley as a professor of art.
