= Victorine =

Victorine may refer to:

== People ==
- Victorine Q. Adams (1912–2006), American politician
- Victorine Brocher (1839–1921), Communard and anarchist
- Tory Dent (1958–2005), American poet, art critic and commentator on AIDS
- Victorine Foot (1920–2000), British painter
- Victorine Goddard (1844–1935), New Zealand homemaker and hotel-keeper
- Victorine du Pont Homsey (1900–1998), American architect
- Victorine Meurent (1844–1927), French model and painter
- Victorine Gboko Wodié, Ivorian lawyer, magistrate and politician
- Sasha Victorine (born 1978), American soccer player
- Victorines, a group of philosophers and mystics based at the School of Saint Victor
- Victorines, monks attached to the Abbey of St Victor, Marseille and its daughter houses

== Other uses ==
- Victorine, one of the Victorines
- Victorine (ship), missing Australian schooner
- USS Utowana (SP-951), also known as USS Victorine (SP-951), a fishing trawler used in World War I as a patrol craft
- Victorine Studios a French film studio located in Nice

== See also ==
- Louise-Victorine Ackermann (1813–1890), French poet
