= Museum of Art and History of West African Cultures =

- Established: 2018; 8 years ago
- Location: Djilor, Senegal
- Coordinates: 14.121054°N 16.660166°W
- Type: History and Art Museum
- Founder: Reginald Groux
- Website: mahicao.org

The Museum of Art and History of West African Cultures (French: Musée d’Art et d’Histoire des Cultures d’Afrique de l’Ouest), abbreviated as Mahicao, is a museum located in Djilor, Senegal. The museum is dedicated to exhibiting artifacts related to West African culture.

== History ==
The museum was inaugurated in 2018. The museum with its construction and collections has mobilized around five hundred million CFA francs. Part of the museum's West African art exhibits were collected by Reginald Groux. Groux began collecting artifacts from different African cultures since 2009. In 2020, the African Diplomatic Academy showed an interest in the museum. The building that houses the museum is based on Sudanese architecture. The founder of the museum, Reginald Groux said that one of the objectives of the creation of the museum is to promote the history of different regions of the continent to Africans.

== Collections ==
The museum's exhibits date from the Saharan Neolithic era to the mid-20th century. The museum contains terracotta statues dating fr\om the 6th century BC. In addition the museum contains objects used in ceremonies and masks. The museum contains exhibits on the geography and history of parts of the African continent such as the Lake Chad basin, in addition to the great empires of the Sahel region. In addition, he presents exhibits on Sudanese metallurgy dating back to the early 1500s BC. One of the oldest objects in the museum is prehistoric Saharan biface. The museum contains funerary neck rests of the Dogon people, Ibo throne from Nigeria, fertility dolls, carved tools as well as statues from Mali dating back to the 14th century. The museum also contains jewelry, musical instruments, textiles, and about 500 artifacts. In addition, the museum contains ancient ironworks and pottery, as well as masquerade dress. Also the museum exhibits Tyi Wara masks made of wood.
