= Dinkoro Coulibaly =

Dinkoro Coulibaly was the ruler of the Bambara Empire from 1755 to 1757. Successor and relative of empire founder Bitòn Coulibaly, Dinkoro soon lost control of the empire in a succession of military coups. Dinkoro was assassinated in 1757, and succeeded by his brother, Ali Coulibaly. The empire fell briefly into civil war before Ngolo Diarra seized control in 1766 and reasserted stability.
