= Konobougou =

- Commune and town
- Location in Mali
- Coordinates: 12°55′N 6°46′W
- Country: Mali
- Region: Ségou Region
- Cercle: Barouéli Cercle

Population (1998)
  - Total: 26,084
- Time zone: UTC+0 (GMT)

Konobougou is commune in the Cercle of Barouéli in the Ségou Region of southern-central Mali. As of 1998 the commune had a population of 26,084, growing to 37,236 in the 2009 census.
