= Dougoufie =

Coordinates: 13°18′54″N 6°37′52″W

- Commune and town
- Interactive map of Dougoufie
- Country: Mali
- Region: Ségou Region
- Cercle: Barouéli Cercle

Population (1998)
  - Total: 8,557
- Time zone: UTC+0 (GMT)

Dougoufie is a small town and commune in the Cercle of Barouéli in the Ségou Region of southern-central Mali. In 1998 the commune had a population of 8,557.
