= Kalake =

- Commune and town
- Location in Mali
- Coordinates: 12°57′N 6°51′W
- Country: Mali
- Region: Ségou Region
- Cercle: Barouéli Cercle

Population (1998)
  - Total: 11,239
- Time zone: UTC+0 (GMT)

Kalake is a small town and commune in the Cercle of Barouéli in the Ségou Region of southern-central Mali. As of 2009 the commune had a population of 16,306.
