= Sanando =

- Commune and town
- Location in Mali
- Coordinates: 12°58′N 6°24′W
- Country: Mali
- Region: Ségou Region
- Cercle: Barouéli Cercle

Population (1998)
  - Total: 24,033
- Time zone: UTC+0 (GMT)

Sanando is a small town and commune in the Cercle of Barouéli in the Ségou Region of southern-central Mali. As of 1998 the commune had a population of 24,033.
