= N'tomo mask =

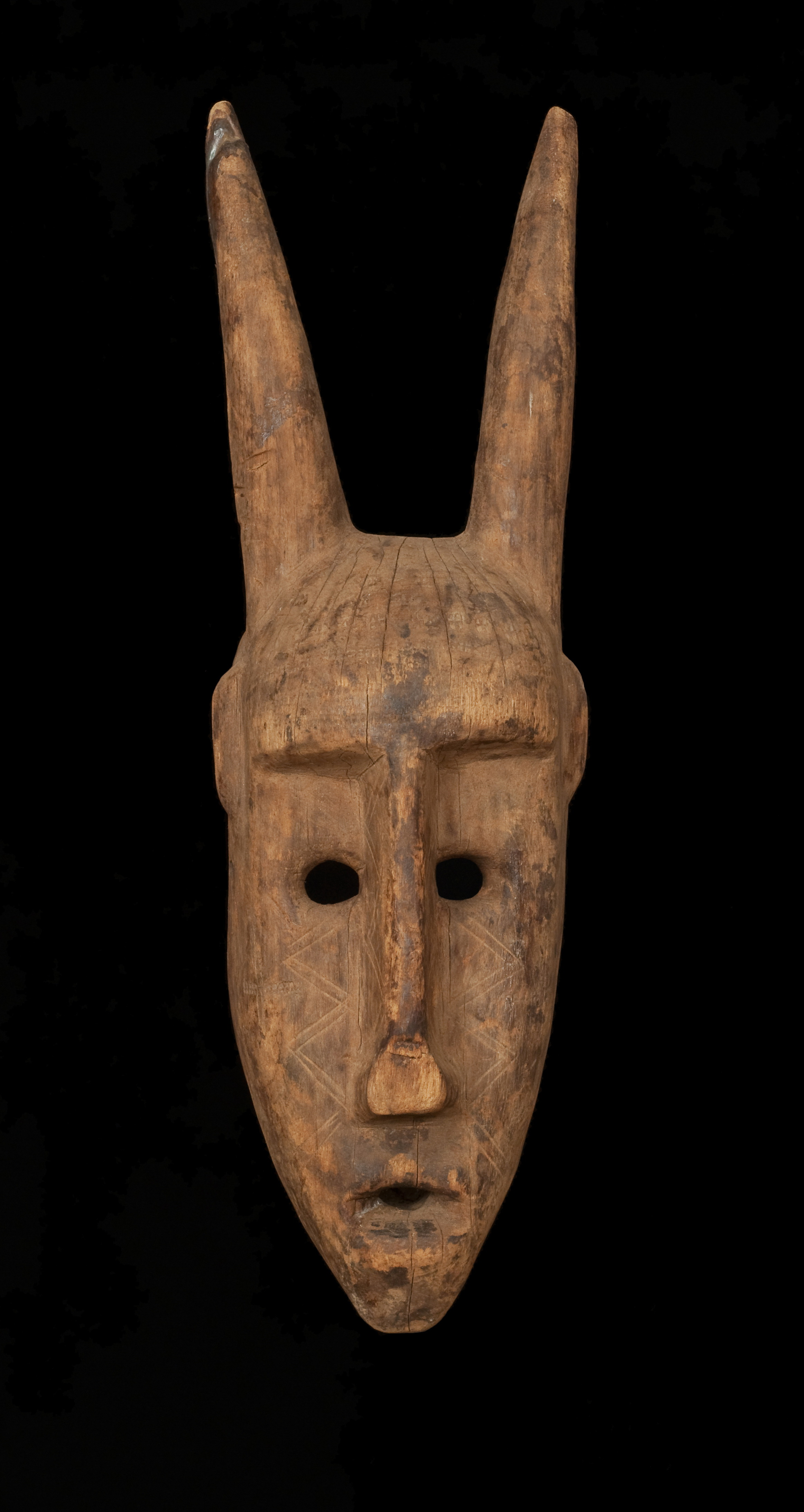
This is a photo of the Bambara mask on display at The Australian Museum. It is made out of carved wooden anthropomorphic and then overlaid with metal. It was donated to the Museum in 1979 by some Bambara people.

N'tomo masks are used by the Bambara people of West Africa. There are six male initiation societies that young males must pass through before becoming a man. N'tomo Dyo is the first of these through which boys pass before their circumcision. The mask represents the legendary ancestor of the Bambara and it is a symbol of protection.

The mask is made of wood and may be covered in shells, seeds or brass. The face, which is typically oval-shaped, may be more or less abstract, but is always topped by a row of vertical projections. The number of spikes indicates whether the mask is masculine, feminine or androgynous. Three, six or nine are male; four and eight are female; and two, five and seven are androgynous. The mask was also used at agricultural festivities and to prevent illness.

== History ==
Research indicates that the Bambara mask dates back to the early to mid-18th century. It was used for ceremonial purposes. Many rituals such as weddings, births, circumcisions and funerals were performed with these masks. The mask was given offerings and sacrifices and on specific cases were ritually buried when their uses were no longer and their character was lost. The mask is also used in agricultural rituals. The Bambara people are primarily concerned with agriculture, and the fertility of the land. They have a strong connection with the earth and believe the mask will ensure a good harvest and it celebrates an excellent farmer.

The Bambara people had six male societies and each society had its own unique mask. One of the societies called ‘jo’ is about initiation, a procedure that every boy had to go through to become a man. This initiation only stopped a few decades ago. At each stage of the procedure or initiation the young man is required to wear a mask. One of the procedures involves the young man going to live in the bush for one week. After this he would return to the village where he would perform in the mask the dances and songs he learnt in the bush and then be given small gifts from spectators. After that, they are ritually bathed which signals the end of their animal life and the beginning of their new life as ‘jo’ children. Another mask depicts the culture as well as the life of the tribe. Without this the tribe believed that chaos would come upon them as their crops wouldn't grow, and they couldn't perform weddings or initiations.

Today, the mask is still used for the same purposes in the tribe and also has a few extra ones. As well as its preexisting uses it is now used for educational, decorative and display purposes. People can now purchase the masks online. Commercially they can be sold for between $200 and $1,000. People place them in their house as decoration or to represent their love for African culture. They are put in museums for display and educational purposes. People can see them in the museum and learn about the history of the mask, as it depicts the culture and life of the tribe.

These masks play a significant role in the culture and spiritual world of the Bambara people. The masks are visually expressive and have high attention to detail. The masks illustrate the craftsmanship of the tribe and how this has been passed on to other generations. The masks allow the traditions of rites and ceremonies of the tribe to continue in some form today. There is clearly a special relationship between the Bambara people and their masks. The masks are more than just art to them; they represent the life of the tribe.
