= Marka people =

Mande people of northwest Mali

Marka
Languages
- Marka language

Religion
- Islam

Related ethnic groups
- Bambara people and Soninke people

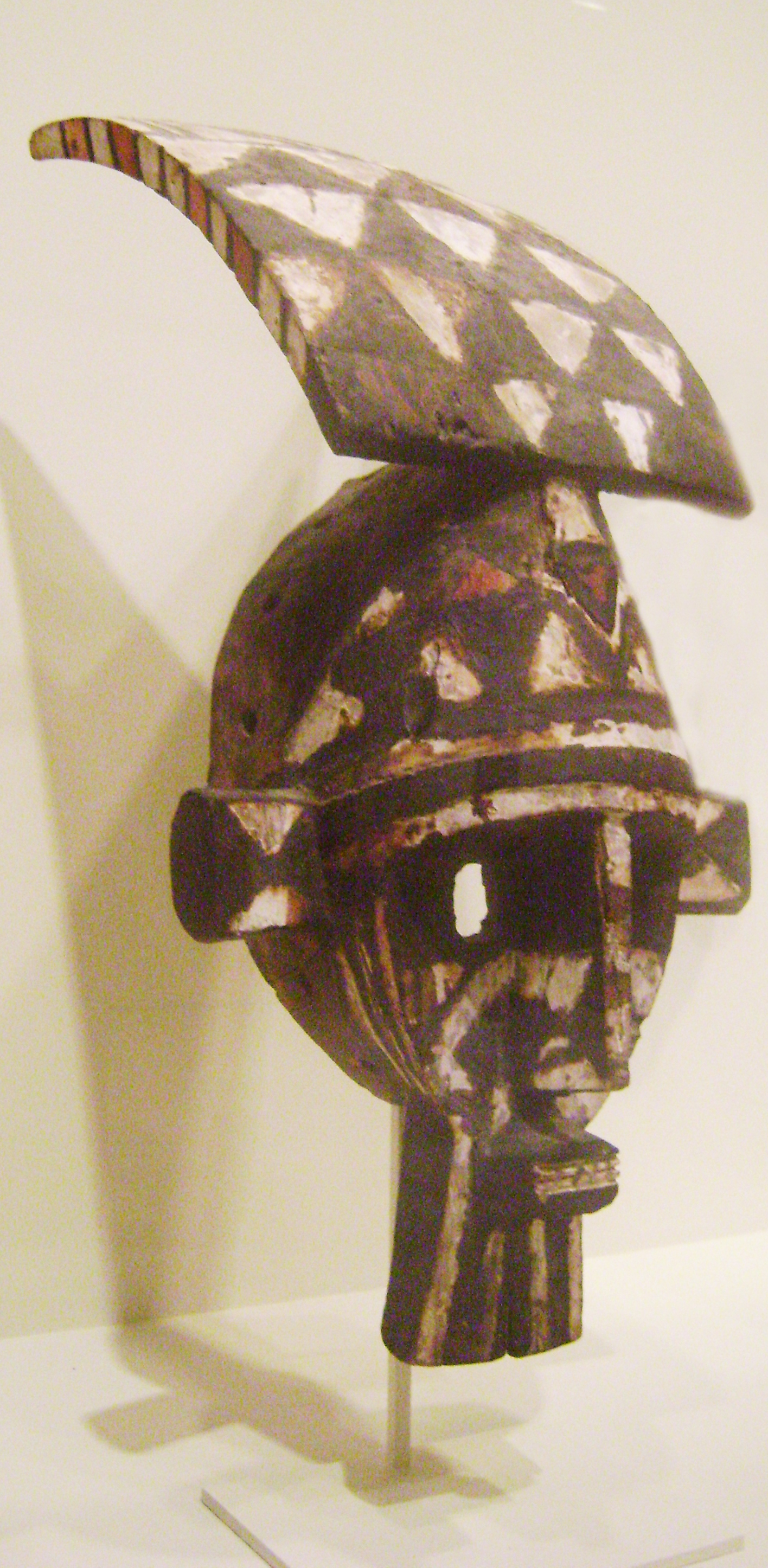
Wood pigment mid-20th-century face mask of the Marka people in Burkina Faso in the collection of the Cincinnati Art Museum

The Marka (also Marka Dafing, Meka, or Maraka) people are a Mande people of northwest Mali. They speak Marka, a Manding language. Some of the Maraka people are found in Ghana.

== History ==
The Marka originated from Soninke people from the Wagadu Empire who migrated to the middle Niger between the 11th and 13th centuries. The term 'Maraka' means 'men who rule' in Bambara, which may have originated as a term for the colonists from Wagadu or merely as a term of respect.

Relatively geographically constrained compared to other trading communities such as the Jakhanke and Dyula people, they founded Nyamina and Sansanding during this early period, and Barouéli and Banamba in the 19th century. All four were at various times prominent trading and religious centers.

Muslim merchant communities at the time of the Bambara Empire, the Maraka largely controlled the desert-side trade between the Sahel and nomadic Berbers and Moors of the Sahara. Their economy was based on slave plantation agriculture growing food and cotton to be traded. The Bambara integrated Maraka communities into their state structure, and Maraka trading posts and plantations multiplied in the Segu based state and its Kaarta vassals in the 18th and early 19th centuries. When the Bambara Empire (which practiced African spirituality) was defeated by the Maraka's fellow Muslim Umar Tall in the 1850s, the Maraka's unique trade and landholdings concessions suffered damage from which they never recovered.

== Today ==
Today there are only around 25,000 Marka speakers, and they are largely integrated amongst their Soninke and Bambara neighbors.

Among the peoples of the Inner Niger Delta, the Marka are "rice-growing specialists," successfully cultivating rice despite dramatic, unpredictable variations in seasonal flooding, many of their methods for dealing with which are kept secret from neighboring tribes.

== Culture ==
The Marka people are adherents of Islam.
