= Chiwara =

Ritual object representing an antelope, used by the Bambara ethnic group in Mali

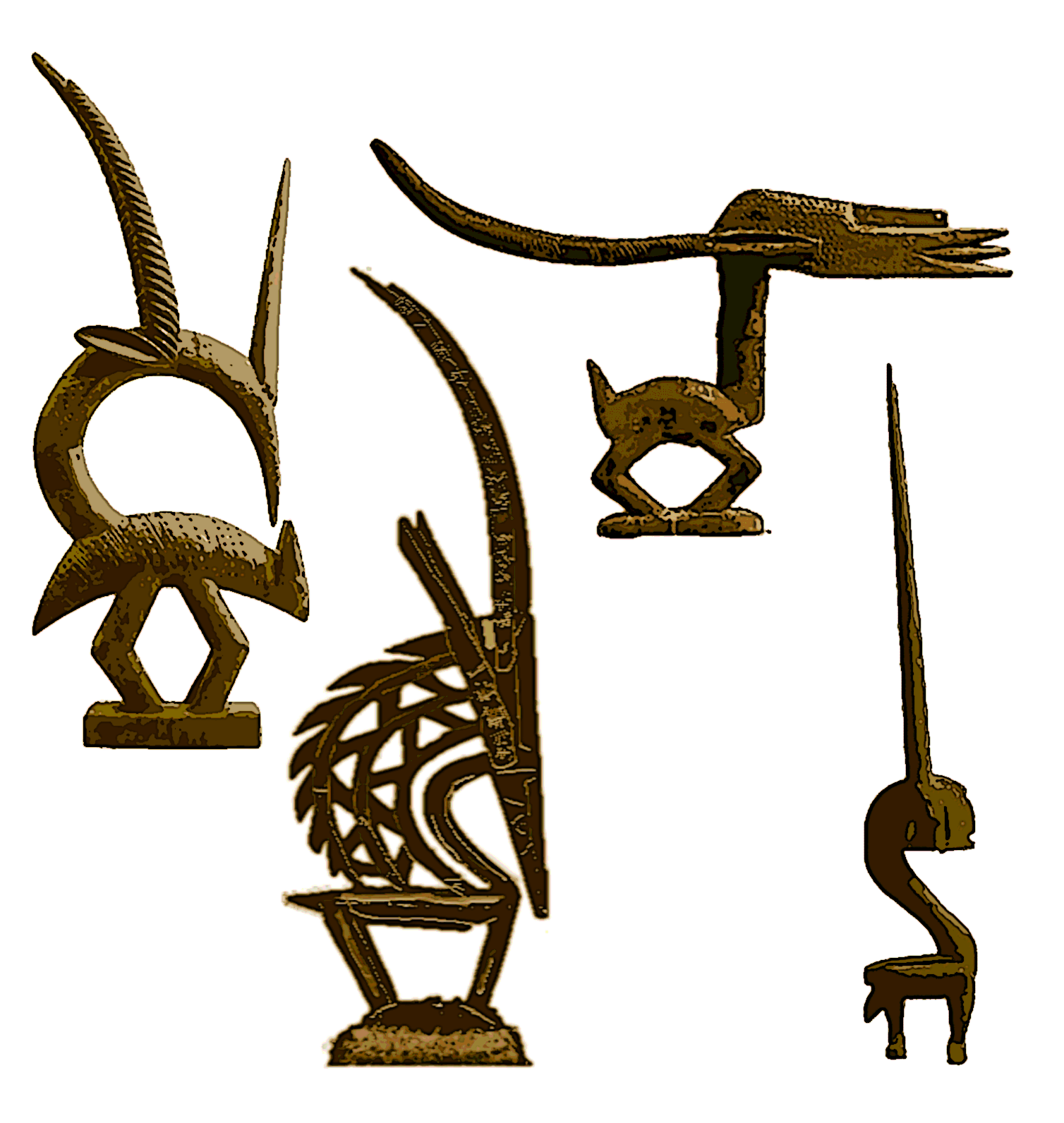
Comparison of the four major styles of the Chiwara mask of the Bambara people of Mali. Clockwise from top left: abstract, Bougouni/southern region, vertical/Segu/northern region, and horizontal/Bamako/Northern region

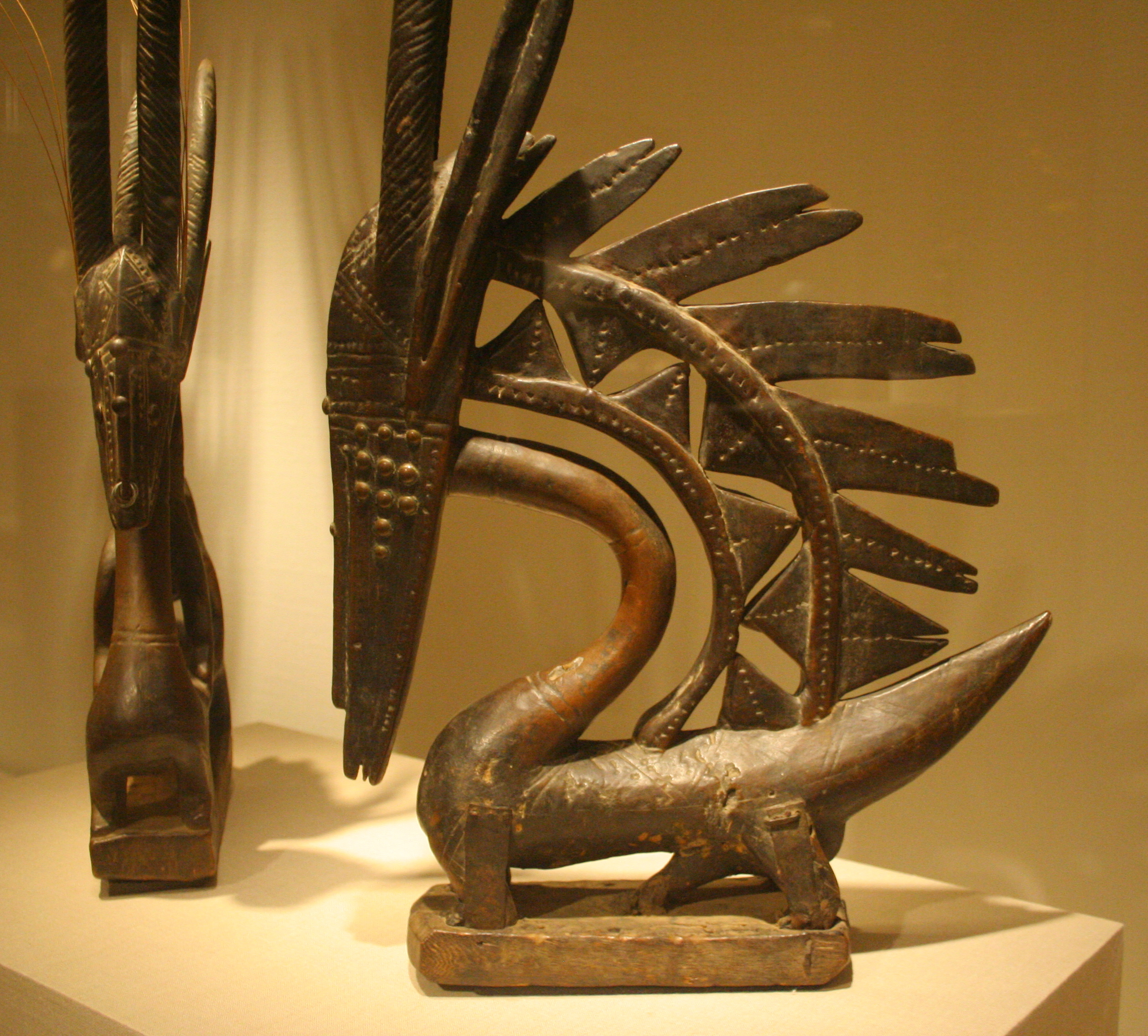
Two Chiwara at the Art Institute of Chicago. Female (left) and male Vertical styles.

A Chiwara (also Chi wara, Ci Wara, or Tyi Wara; Bambara: ciwara; French: tchiwara) is a ritual object representing an antelope, used by the Bambara ethnic group in Mali. The Chiwara initiation society uses Chiwara masks, as well as dances and rituals associated primarily with agriculture, to teach young Bamana men social values as well as agricultural techniques.

== Stylistic variations ==
Chiwara masks are categorized in three ways: horizontal, vertical, or abstract. In addition, Chiwara can be either male or female. Female Chiwara masks are denoted by the presence of a baby antelope and straight horns. Male Chiwara masks have bent horns and a phallus. The sex of a Chiwara mask is much clearer on horizontal and vertical masks while abstract masks tend to be difficult to classify.

The appearance of the Chiwara form varies greatly both by region and time produced. Specific master wood carvers also subtly modified the accepted (or even religiously mandated) local forms, forming a distinct "signature" or "school" of Chiwara figures. These regional variations have been roughly assigned the stylistic categories above. Thus the Bougouni / Southern region style are an amalgam of several animal motifs combined in the same work, in an abstract style; the Bamako / Northern region style is usually of the horizontal style; the Segu/ Northern region style (the heartland of the Bambara Empire) matches the vertical style with the unique "cut out" triangular body motif of the males. Other regional styles have been proposed, including the Sikasso region style, with a thin, delicate, vertical form within almost human, snoutless face.

== Ceremonial usage ==
In Bambara, chi wara means laboring wild animal, and is a representation of Bambara mythos about the creation of farming.

=== Mousso Koroni ===
While there are several versions of the story, the discovery of agriculture is credited to the hero Chi Wara, a half antelope, half human figure born from the union of the earth goddess Mousso Koroni and the spitting cobra N'gorogo. The Chi Wara came to earth to teach humans to sow crops, and thus is honored at both sowing and harvest festivals.

=== The Chi Wara figure ===
The Chi Wara itself is usually represented as a Roan Antelope with an almost human face, but also takes shapes of other creatures and emblems of farming. The hero descends from the sky goddess, and thus represents the sun, its body is often elongated and short legged to represent the aardvark who burrows into the earth like a farmer. Its high horns echo the stalks of millet, and it stands on a dancer clad in a mass of raffia stalks to represent both flowing water and a bountiful harvest. The zig-zag patterns echo the movement of the sun across the sky, and the penis of the male figure stands low to the ground, fertilizing the earth. The Chi Wara figures always appear as a male/female pair, combining the elements of fertility of humans with fertility of the earth. The female figure usually carries a young antelope on her back, and is said to represent human beings carried by the Chi Wara hero, as well as a newborn human carried on a mother's back.

=== chi wara ton ===
As farmers of the upper Niger river savanna, the blessing of agriculture is of central importance to Bambara society. These traditions survive in part because the Bambara were one of the last cultures in the area to embrace Islam, after the fall of the Bambara Empire in the late 19th century. Bambara culture has traditionally had a strict set of age and caste fraternities (ton/jo/jow), and the chi wara ton society is one of the more important. It gathers all young adult males of the Soli age group to work the fields at clearing, sowing and harvest, when the greatest number of laborers is needed. Secret teachings of the chi wara ton pass the needed skills for this work, upon which the very survival of the community depends.

The chi wara ton is also the only major Bambara society which includes both sexes. Women's labor is needed for agriculture, just as both sexes are needed for human reproduction.

=== Dance ===
The Chi Wara is always danced with each wooden figure attached to a basket on the dancer's head, and the body covered in a huge pile of raffia. Often the face is obscured with raffia that has been colored or decorated, and the dancer carries a long staff. The figures are always in one or more male/female pairs, with the female usually dancing behind the male, fanning him and spreading his powers into the gathered community. The Male figures leap to represent the antelope, and then scratch the earth with their staves or horns as the Chi Wara teaches humans to cultivate crops. In some communities the Mousso Koroni figure also appears. Initiated children wear a "Sogono Kuni" ("Little antelope head"), which is quite rare to find in museums.

== World influence ==
African sculptural forms became fashionable amongst European artists and collectors at the beginning of the Twentieth century, and the Chiwara, especially in its more abstract forms, became one of the icons of what Europeans called Primitive Art. The artist Guillaume Apollinaire and collector Paul Guillaume published images of the Chiwara in their Sculptures nègres in 1917, while Picasso, Braque, and Les Fauves became fascinated with African sculpture and masks in general, and the Chiwara figure in particular.

A vertical, male, semi-abstracted Chiwara figure was included in the 1935 Metropolitan Museum of Art exhibit African Negro Art, and the Masterpieces of African Art at the Brooklyn Museum in 1954, (as well as shows in London and Paris) shows which were highly influential to western artists and collectors. Variations of its triangular cut-out pattern are echoed in mid-20th century Modernist art, and its outline remains one of the most recognizable of African art forms.

The American artist Lorenzo Pace was inspired by Bambaran-style Chiwara art in the Met to create Triumph of the Human Spirit, an abstract sculpture commemorating African Burial Ground National Monument.
