= Gouendo =

Coordinates: 12°49′45″N 6°29′47″W

- Commune and town
- Interactive map of Gouendo
- Country: Mali
- Region: Ségou Region
- Cercle: Barouéli Cercle

Population (1998)
  - Total: 8,724
- Time zone: UTC+0 (GMT)

Gouendo is a small town and commune in the Cercle of Barouéli in the Ségou Region of southern-central Mali. In 1998 the commune had a population of 8,724.
