= Victorine Gboko Wodié =

Ivorian politician (born 1954)

Victorine Gboko-Dailly Wodié (born 1954) is a lawyer, magistrate and politician from the Ivory Coast.

== Early life and education ==
Victorine Wodié was born in 1954 in Abidjan. She was educated at the Lycee Classique de Bouake. She gained a bachelor of law degree in 1977, and in 1978 a master's degree from the University of Aix-Marseilles. In 1978 she obtained her certificat d'aptitude à la profession d'avocat (CAPA) qualification, and in 1979 a diplôme d'études supérieures spécialisées (DESS) in judicial process.

== Career ==
In 1980 Wodié started at the Court of Appeal in Abidjan, interning with Bâtonnier Eugène Dervain from 1980 to 1982. From 1983 to 1985 she was a partner with Mondon-Kone-Wodié. From 1986 she headed her own law firm. From 1989 to 1993 she was a member of the Council of the Order of Lawyers, and in July 1992 was a founding member of the Association Ivoirienne de Défense des Droits de la Femme (AIDF). From 1996 until 2002 she practiced at the Abidjan Court of Appeals.

From 2002 to 2003 she was Minister Delegate of Justice charged with Human Rights. From 2003 to 2005, she was the Minister for Human Rights. In 2007 she was elected president of the Commission nationale des droits de l'Homme de Côte d'Ivoire (CNDCI), remaining in the post until 2012.

== Personal life ==
She is married to Francis Wodié.

== See also ==
- Politics of Ivory Coast
