= Battle of Noukouma =

1800s african battle

- Part of the Jihad of Seku Amadu
Date	21 March 1818
Location	Noukouma
Result	Jihadist Victory

Belligerents
Massina Empire; Supported By: Sokoto Caliphate	Bamana Empire: Fulani military aristocracies

Commanders and leaders
Seku Amadu	Da Diarra; Arɗo Amadu; Gelaajo (surrendered); Jamogo Séri †

Strength
1,000	100,000

Casualties and losses
Unknown	Unknown

The Battle of Noukouma was fought on 21 March 1818 between a small force of jihadists led by Seku Amadu and a Bamana force led by General Jamogo Séri. (Note: Also referred to as Diamogo Séri.) It was the first and most significant battle of Seku Amdadu's jihad and saw an unexpected jihadist victory against the numerically superior Bamana army. The victory was interpreted as a divine miracle by many and allowed Seku Amadu to rapidly expand his army to over 40,000.

== Background ==
The Fulas of the region had for centuries been the vassals of larger states, including the Mali Empire (13th-14th centuries), the Songhai Empire (15th century), the Moroccan Pashalik of Timbuktu (16th century), and the Bambara Empire at Ségou (17th century).

By the early 1800s, many of these larger states had declined in power and inspired by the recent Muslim uprisings of Usman dan Fodio in nearby Hausaland, preacher and social reformer Seku Amadu began efforts at increasing religious revivals in his homeland. Amadu was born from a minor scholar family from one of the less important Fulbe clans. He was both a religious and political outsider which increasingly led him to clash with the established elites as his influence in the region grew at their expense.

This tension would lead to open confrontation in 1816/1817 when Arɗo Guidado (Note: Meaning "chief" in Fulfulde, each arɗo lead a clan of Fulani.), son of the Middle Niger arɗo mawɗo (Note: Meaning "Great Arɗo" Fulfulde, the arɗo mawɗo is the leader of all the arɗos.) Arɗo Amadu, stole a blanket from one of Seku Amadu's followers in the village of Simay (north of Djenné). A week later in the same village another one of Seku Amadu's followers, on the orders of Seku Amadu, demanded that Arɗo Guidado return the blanket. When Arɗo Guidado refused and began to insult Seku Amadu, the follower killed Aro Guidado.

Seku Amadu and his followers then fled to Noukouma where he gathered supporters and allies. There he looked towards the Sokoto Caliphate as a source of inspiration and legitimacy. He had already sought advice from Abdullahi dan Fodio but now was requesting support from Usman dan Fodio in his upcoming war against Bamana. Seku Amadu, through his delegation, pledged allegiance to Sokoto and was authorized to wage a jihad against his enemies, represented by a flag. Like in many other areas, Sokoto's goal was to establish a Sokoto-dependent emirate in the Middle Niger.

At the same time, Arɗo Amadu used the incident at Simay to gain the support of Da Diarra, the king of Bamana, and other Arɗos in the region. Through their support, he was able to mobilize an army of over 200,000 men from Segu, Poromani, Monimpé, Goundaka, and Massina to crush the Jihadists.

== Battle ==
By March 1818 the annual flood water of the Niger River had already begun retreating in Noukouma. There 1,000 Fulani, Marka, Bozo, and other denizens of the Middle Niger had gathered around their leader, Seku Amadu. On the outskirts situated a 100,000-strong army led by General Jamogo Séri who was prepared to annihilate the Jihadists. The Bamana army had a clear military and numerical advantage over the jihadists as they possed rifles compared to the jihadists who only had rudimentary weapons such as bows, arrows, and spears.

Seku Amadu's address to his followers

There is no might nor power except in God. In your faces I see composure despite the danger that threatens us. The great day has arrived. Do not be discouraged by the confusion of your wives and the position of the enemy that seems to give them an advantage. Today is for us a new Badr. Remember the victory that the Prophet won against the coalition of unbelievers. Did he not attack the enemies with only 313 fighters? Did he not gain a glaring victory? ... We, in turn, have to rise above the events that threaten us and dominate the situation. Do not say, like some of the Jews who said, “There is no power for us today against Goliath and his soldiers [Qur’ān 2: 249].” Do as those others among them who said, “‘How often has a small company has overcome a large company by permission of God. And God is with the patient.’ And when they went forth to [face] Goliath and his soldiers, they said, ‘Our Lord, pour upon us patience and plant firmly our feet and give us victory over the disbelieving people [Qur’ān 2: 249–250].’

—

The battle began when a Mossi of Yatenga named ‘Abd al-Salām ran up to the Bamana position and fired an arrow that hit a war drum. The man was gunned down by the Bamana. Seku Amadu then organized his force into three fronts made up of the mystically significant number of 313 (in reference to the Battle of Badr) and moved straight towards Séri's camp. This move created such confusion within the Bamana army that they thought the general was retreating. In the ensuing panic, Fulani cattle, frightened by the detonations of the Bamana rifles, rushed towards the retreating Bamana. In the end, General Jamogo Seri was killed in combat and the Bamana force retreated to Yeri where they took shelter in a hastily fortified camp.

== Aftermath ==
=== Jihad ===
Seku Amadu interpreted his victory as a divine miracle and went on to lead a jihad against the rest of the Bambara Empire. His numbers soon swelled to over 40,000 from new recruits and deserters from the Bambara army. Many of those who joined him were oppressed by the Arɗos and even threatened by slave-raiding/former slaves. The empire expanded rapidly, taking Djenné in 1819 and establishing a new capital at Hamdullahi in 1820.

=== Gelaajo ===
After fleeing from the battle, Gelaajo, leader of a strong kingdom centred on Goundaka, pledged allegiance to Seku Amadu. This allowed for the annexation of his territories as a province within the Massina Empire. Gelaajo hoped to be appointed governor as compensation for his allegiance but instead one of Seku Amadu's cousins was chosen over him. This led him to revolt in 1824.

=== Relations with Sokoto ===
Some argue that Shaykh Aḥmad cannot claim the title of shaykh since he had pledged allegiance to Shaykh ‘Uthmān b. Fūdī. However, these forget that when Shaykh Aḥmad pledged allegiance, he did it as a poor and weak person, who did not have authority over anybody. Instead of being under the authority of the unbelievers and of the bad Muslims who used to reign at the time on the land, the river and the fields, he chose to submit to one of the biggest shaykhs of his time, making clear he wanted to free himself from the above [evil authorities]. After the wars Aḥmad Lobbo waged and the death of Shaykh ‘Uthmān, and after having set in place substantial and deep reforms, in reviving the Sunna and fighting the innovation ... he became undisputedly the biggest reformer of Islam in the land of the Sūdān.

— al-Mukhtār al-Ṣaghīr,

Following Seku Amadu's unexpected victory at Noukouma, he emerged as a powerful actor within the region who no longer required any support from outside forces. This along with the death of Usman dan Fodio and the following leadership crisis caused him to break allegiance with the Sokoto. In a letter to Muḥammad Bello, Seku Amadu did not deny his earlier allegiance to Sokoto and clearly states that he broke ties after having received requests for allegiance from both Muḥammad Bello and Abdullahi dan Fodio.

However, in a later letter, Seku Amadu stated that his "community" never united with Sokoto and so they cannot be divided.

== Works cited ==
- Abdul Azim Islahi (2009). "Islamic economic thinking in the 12th AH/18th CE century with special reference to Shah Wali-Allah al-Dihlawi" (PDF). MPRA (Paper No. 75432): 48,41. Archived from the original on May 15, 2021.
- Nobili, Mauro (2020). Sultan, Caliph, and the Renewer of the Faith Ahmad Lobbo, the Tārīkh al-fattāsh and the Making of an Islamic State in West Africa. Cambridge University Press. doi:10.1017/9781108804295. ISBN 9781108804295. S2CID 212858306.
- Brodnicka, Monika (11 January 2016). "Massina Empire". The Encyclopedia of Empire. John Wiley & Sons. pp. 1–3. doi:10.1002/9781118455074.wbeoe388. ISBN 9781118440643.
- Nobili, Mauro; Syed, Amir (2021). "Introduction. The Caliphate of Ḥamdallāhi: A history from within". Afriques (12). doi:10.4000/afriques.3203.
- Akyeampong, Emmanuel; Gates, Henry (2012). Dictionary of African Biography. OUP USA. ISBN 9780195382075.
- Sanankoua, Bintou (1990). Un empire peul au XIXe siècle: la Diina du Maasina (in French). Karthala. pp. 45–46. ISBN 9782865372348.
