= Barouéli Cercle =

Coordinates: 13°00′N 6°40′W

- Cercle
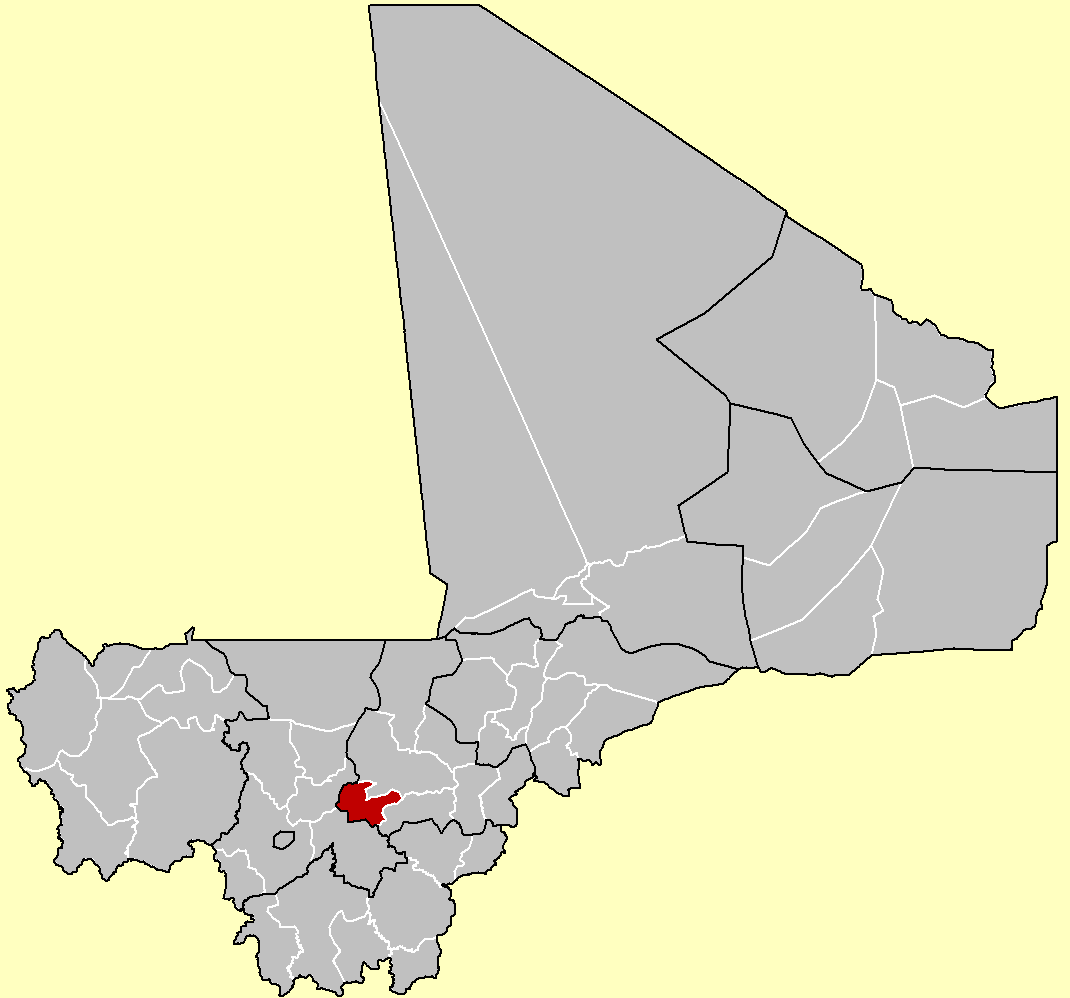
- Location of the Cercle of Barouéli in Mali
- Country: Mali
- Region: Ségou Region
- Capital: Barouéli
- Admin HQ (chef-lieu): Barouéli

Area
  - Total: 4,170 km^{2} (1,610 sq mi)

Population (2009 census)
  - Total: 203,550
  - Density: 48.8/km^{2} (126/sq mi)
- Time zone: UTC+0 (GMT)

Barouéli Cercle is an administrative subdivision of the Ségou Region of Mali. The administrative center (chef-lieu) is the town of Barouéli.

The Cercle is divided into 11 communes:

- Barouéli
- Boidié
- Dougoufié
- Gouendo
- Kalaké
- Konobougou
- N'Gassola
- Sanando
- Somo
- Tamani
- Tesserla
