= Tesserla =

- Commune and town
- Location in Mali
- Coordinates: 13°11′N 6°10′W
- Country: Mali
- Region: Ségou Region
- Cercle: Barouéli Cercle

Population (1998)
  - Total: 5,388
- Time zone: UTC+0 (GMT)

Tesserla is a small town and commune in the Cercle of Barouéli in the Ségou Region of southern-central Mali. In 1998 the commune had a population of 5,388.
