= Saint-Esprit, Martinique =

Saint-Esprit
- Commune
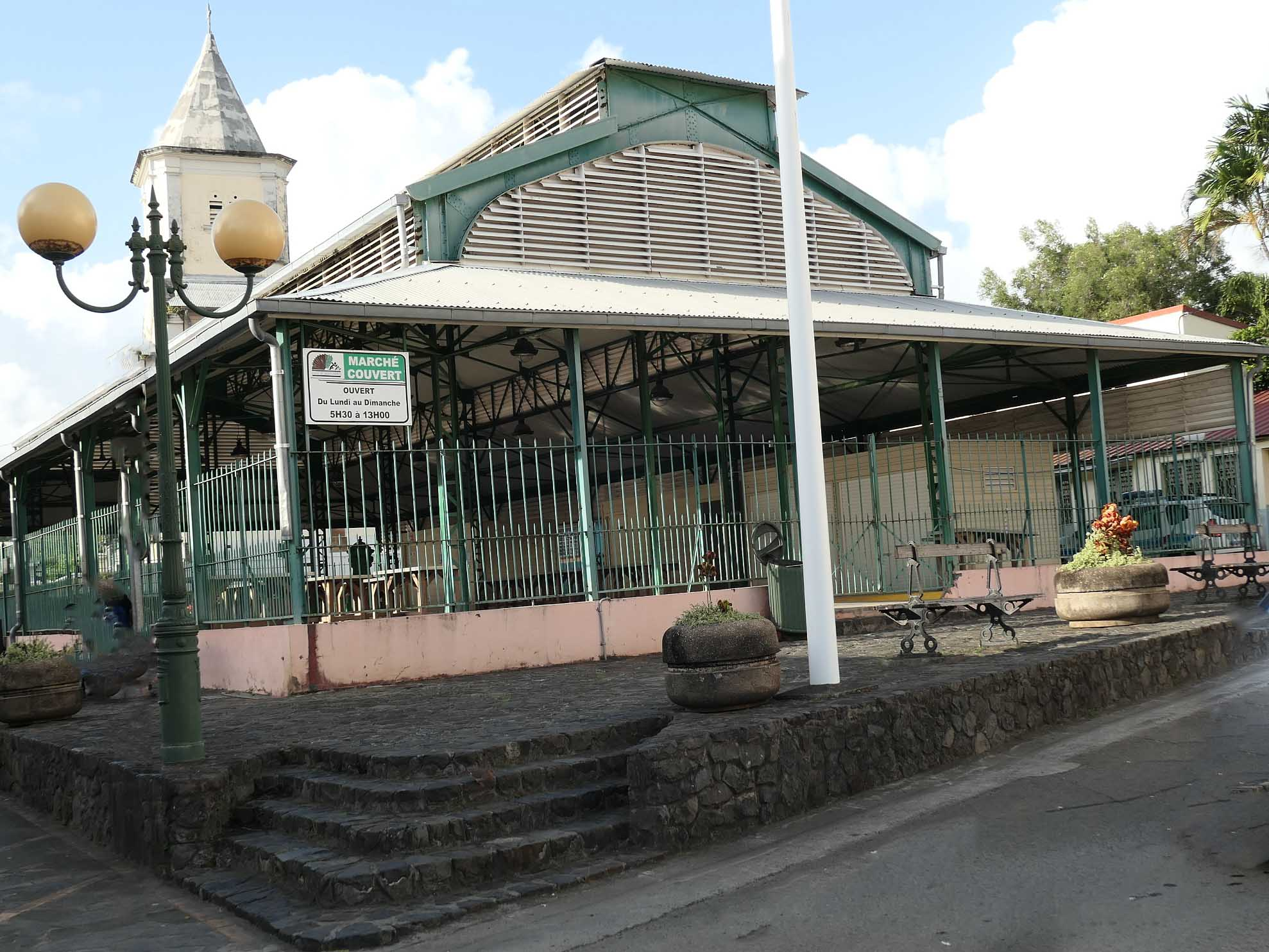
- Market at Saint-Esprit

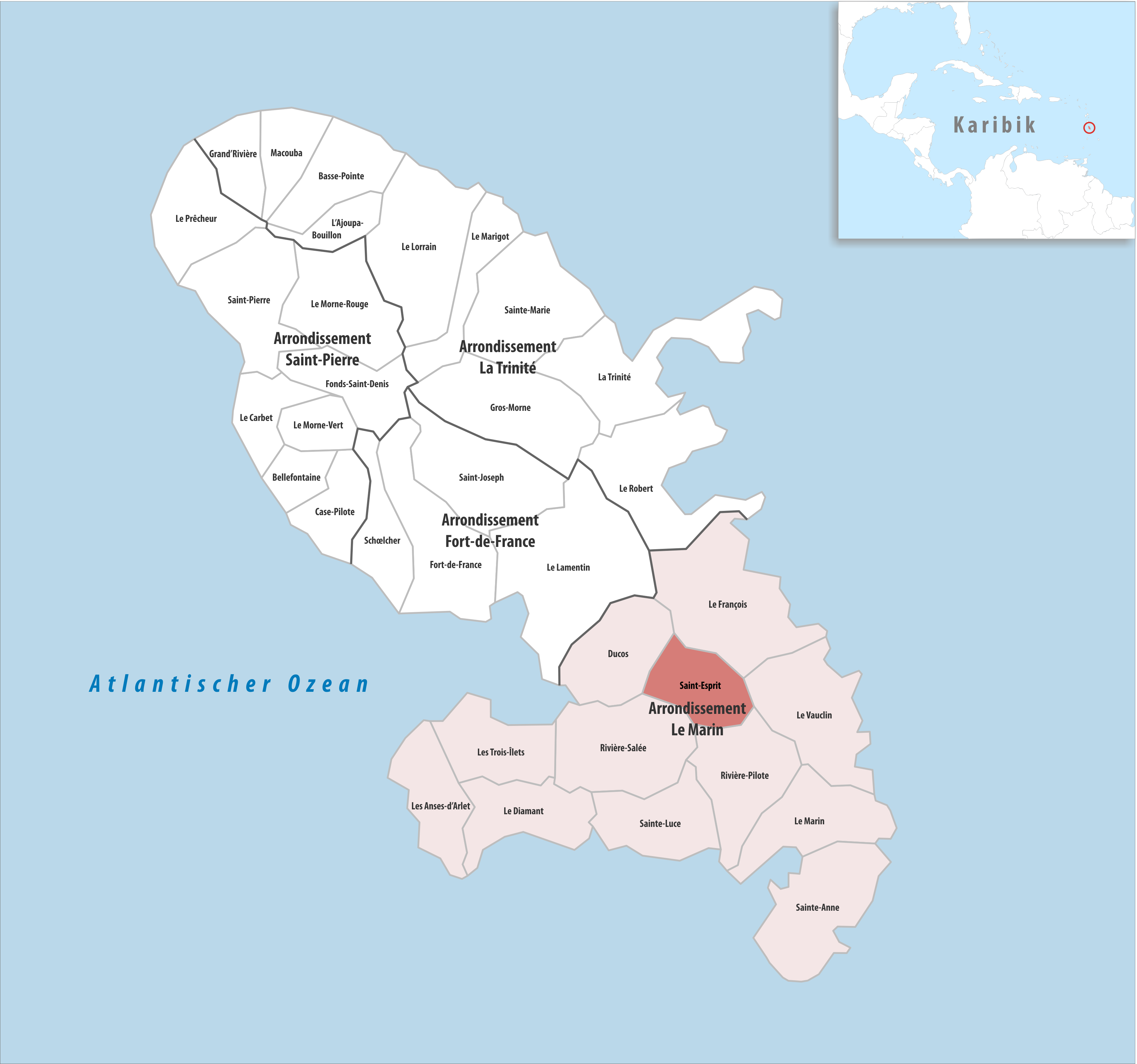
- Location of the commune (in red) within Martinique
- Location of Saint-Esprit
- Location within France
- Coordinates: 14°33′N 60°56′W
- Country: France
- Overseas region and department: Martinique
- Arrondissement: Le Marin
- Intercommunality: CA Espace Sud de la Martinique

Government
  - Mayor (2020–2026): Fred Michel Tirault
- Area^{1}: 23.46 km^{2} (9.06 sq mi)
- Highest elevation: 388 m (1,273 ft)
- Lowest elevation: 6 m (20 ft)
- Population (2023): 10,322
  - Density: 440.0/km^{2} (1,140/sq mi)
- Time zone: UTC−04:00 (AST)
- INSEE/Postal code: 97223 /97270
- ^{1} French Land Register data, which excludes lakes, ponds, glaciers > 1 km^{2} (0.386 sq mi or 247 acres) and river estuaries.

Saint-Esprit (French pronunciation: [sɛ̃t‿ɛspʁi]) is a commune in the French overseas department and region of Martinique.

== Overview ==
Saint-Esprit was founded in the 18th century. The economy of the village used to based on sugar plantations. The original name of the village was Bourg des Coulisses, due to the sugar cane which was transported by streams from the hill down to the mill in the valley. In 1833, Saint-Esprit was established as a commune.

The Saint-Esprit Church was constructed in 1758 by the Capuchins. The church was relocated, and its former location is currently in use by the hospital. One of the bells of the church is named Sebastopol, and was taken during the Crimean War.

The village is located in a forested zone along the Cacaos and the Coulisses River.

The local football club is Stade Spiritain.

== Population ==
Historical population
Year	Pop.	±% p.a.
1967	8,045	—
1974	7,676	−0.67%
1982	7,236	−0.74%
1990	7,767	+0.89%
1999	8,203	+0.61%
2007	8,899	+1.02%
2012	9,595	+1.52%
2017	9,432	−0.34%
2023	10,322	+1.51%
Source: INSEE

== Notable people ==
- Eugène Dervain (1928-2010), playwright, lawyer and judge.
- Jimmy Jean-Joseph (1972), athlete who competed at the Olympics.

== See also ==
- Communes of the Martinique department
