= Marka language =

Manding language of West Africa

Marka
- Native to: Burkina Faso
- Ethnicity: Marka people
- Native speakers: 190,000 (2009–2014)
- Language family: Niger–Congo?: Mande; Western Mande; Manding; East Manding; Marka

Language codes
- ISO 639-3: rkm
- Glottolog: mark1256

Marka, also called Dafing, is a Manding language of West Africa, spoken in northwest Burkina Faso.
