= Kaladian Coulibaly =

West African ruler

- Reign: c. 1652–1682
- Predecessor: Koita Dynasty
- Successor: Danfassari
- Born: Kong, Ivory Coast
- Issue: Coulibaly dynasty
- Religion: traditional African religion

Kaladian Coulibaly was a West African ruler who founded one of the first large Bambara kingdoms, centered on Ségou in what is now Mali. Originally from Kong in what is now the Ivory Coast, he was a mercenary warlord who overthrew the ruling Koita dynasty of Segou. Around 1650, Coulibaly's kingdom was one of the dominant forces in the region. Though it lacked a systematic framework and thus failed to outlast his death (c. 1680), his great-grandson Bitòn Coulibaly would found a more stable Bambara Empire fifty years later on the same spot.
