= Simay =

Simay is a feminine given name of Turkish origin. Notable people with the name include:

== Given name ==
- Simay Barlas (born 1999), Turkish actress
- Simay Karaman (born 1991), Turkish basketball player
- Simay Kurt (born 2000), Turkish volleyball player
- Simay Özçiftçi (born 2003), Turkish sprinter
