= Mansong Diarra =

- Faama
- Reign: 1790-1808
- Predecessor: Ngolo Diarra
- Successor: Da Diarra
- Died: 1808
- House: Ngolosi
- Father: Ngolo Diarra
- Religion: traditional African religion

Mansong Diarra (c. 1790–1808), also rendered Monzon Jara, was the faama of the Segou Empire. Son of king Ngolo Diarra, he ascended to the throne of Ségou following his father's death in battle.

== Reign ==
Mansong's reign was the high point of Segou's power. He built over 300 new villages, welcomed immigrants of various ethnicities, and waged numerous successful campaigns. He earned renown as a great warrior, with defeats against several other groups, including Kaarta, Massina, Dogon, and Mossi.

=== Mungo Park ===
Mungo Park, passing through the Bambara capital of Ségou in 1797 recorded a testament to the Empire's prosperity under Mansong:

The view of this extensive city, the numerous canoes on the river, the crowded population, and the cultivated state of the surrounding countryside, formed altogether a prospect of civilization and magnificence that I little expected to find in the bosom of Africa.

Mansong himself provided Park with a gift of 5000 cowries to help him on his travels.

== Personal life ==
Mansong was, according to oral histories, a calm, hardworking man, with an astute political mind capable of both great cruelty and mercy. His son Da Mansong Diarra would succeed him after his death.
