= Da Mansong Diarra =

- Faama
- Reign: 1808-1827
- Predecessor: Mansong Diarra
- Successor: Tiéfolo Diarra
- Died: 1827
- House: Ngolosi
- Father: Mansong Diarra
- Religion: traditional African religion

Da Mansong Diarra, also spelled Da Manzon, was the ruling Faama of the Segou Empire from 1808 to 1827. During his reign, the province of Massina was lost when he was defeated by Sekou Amadou at the Battle of Noukouma in 1818.
