= Ngolo Diarra =

Leader of the Bambara Empire

- Faama
- Reign: 1766-1790
- Predecessor: Ali Coulibaly
- Successor: Mansong Diarra
- Born: Niola
- Religion: traditional African religion

Ngolo Diarra was faama of the Bambara Empire from 1766 to 1790.

As a young man his village, Niola, gave Ngolo to the state as disongo annual tribute and became a ton djon or slave warrior in the service of Bitòn Coulibaly. After his rise to power, Ngolo returned to his native village and destroyed it as revenge.

Following the 1755 death of empire founder Bitòn Coulibaly, his descendants (the Bitonsi) proved unable to maintain control, and the kingdom fell into chaos. Ngolo Diarra, by now a leader of the ton djon, seized the throne in 1766 and soon restored order. He defeated the Macina Empire and re-established firm control over Djenne and Timbuktu. His reign is remembered in oral histories as a time of great economic prosperity.

Mungo Park, passing through the Bambara capital of Ségou two years after Diarra's 1795 death, recorded a testament to the Empire's prosperity under his reign:

"The view of this extensive city, the numerous canoes on the river, the crowded population, and the cultivated state of the surrounding countryside, formed altogether a prospect of civilization and magnificence that I little expected to find in the bosom of Africa."^{1}

Ngolo Diarra died in a campaign against the Mossi in 1790 and was succeeded by his son Mansong Diarra. His descendants, the Ngolosi, continued to rule the Empire until its fall to Toucouleur conqueror El Hadj Umar Tall in 1861.

The famous French footballer N'Golo Kanté was named after him.

== Notes ==
1. Qtd. in Davidson 245.
