= Bitòn Coulibaly =

Ruler of the Bambara Empire

Mamary Coulibaly
- Biton
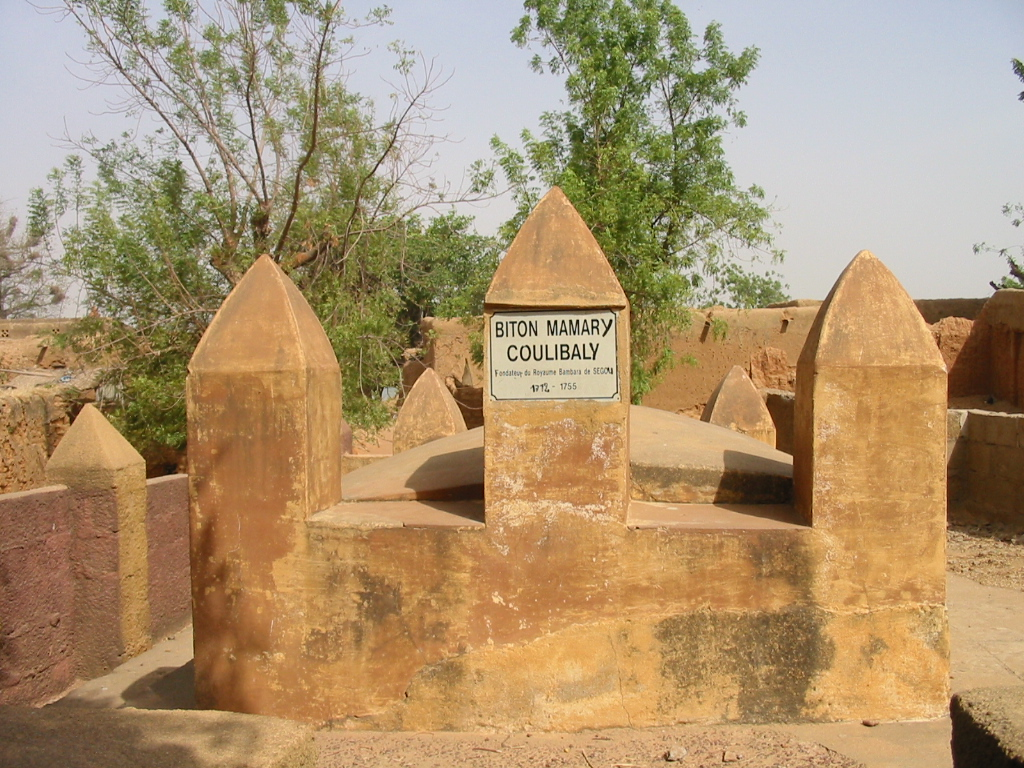
- Coulibaly's grave, near Ségou
- Reign: 1712-1755
- Predecessor: Souma Coulibaly
- Successor: Dinkoro Coulibaly
- Burial: Segou
- House: Coulibaly
- Religion: Islam

Bitòn Coulibaly (1689?–1755), also known as Mamary Coulibaly, founded the Bambara Empire in what is now Mali's Ségou Region and Mopti Region.

== Biography ==
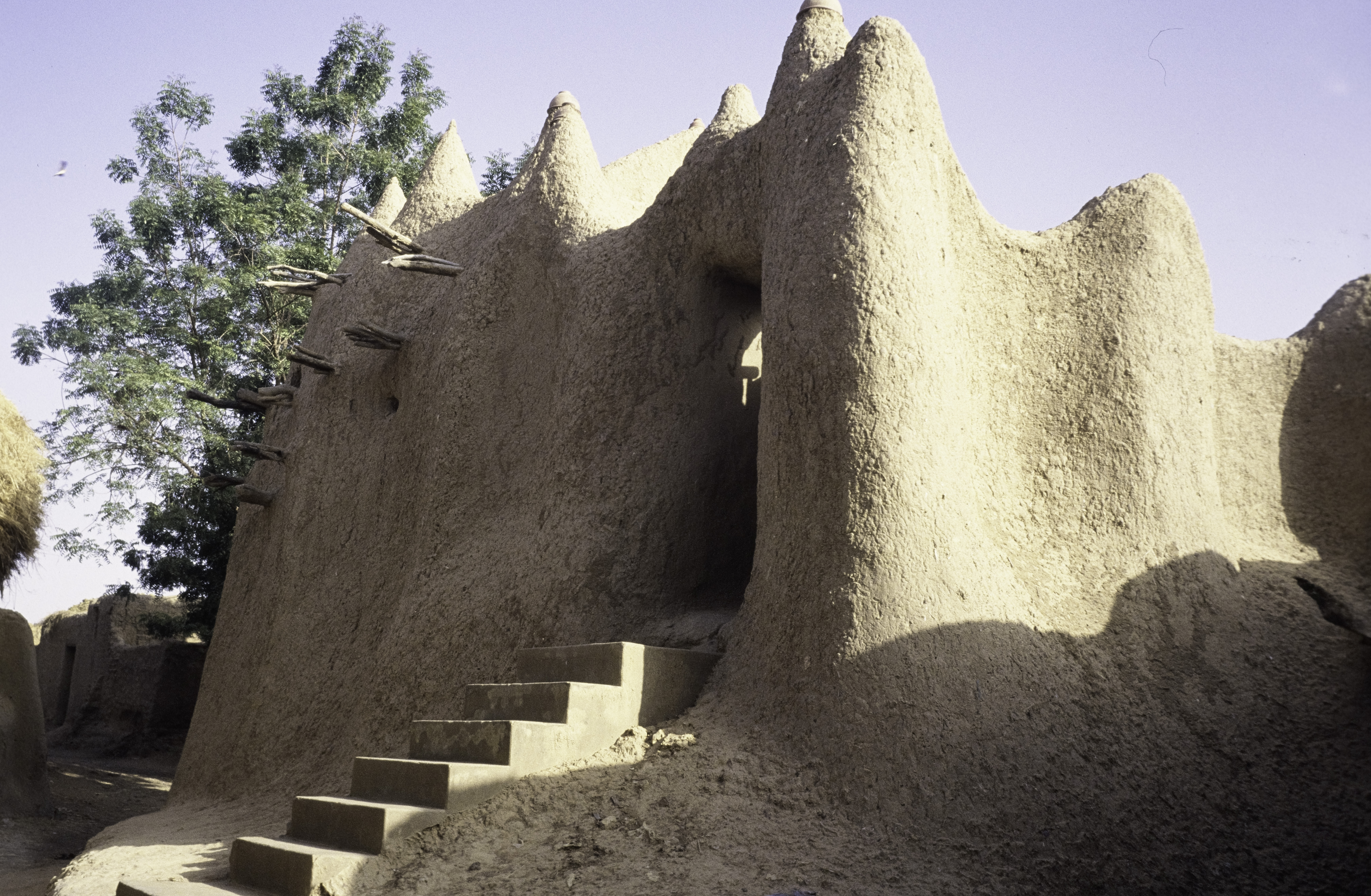
Mosque built by Coulibaly, Ségou (1983)

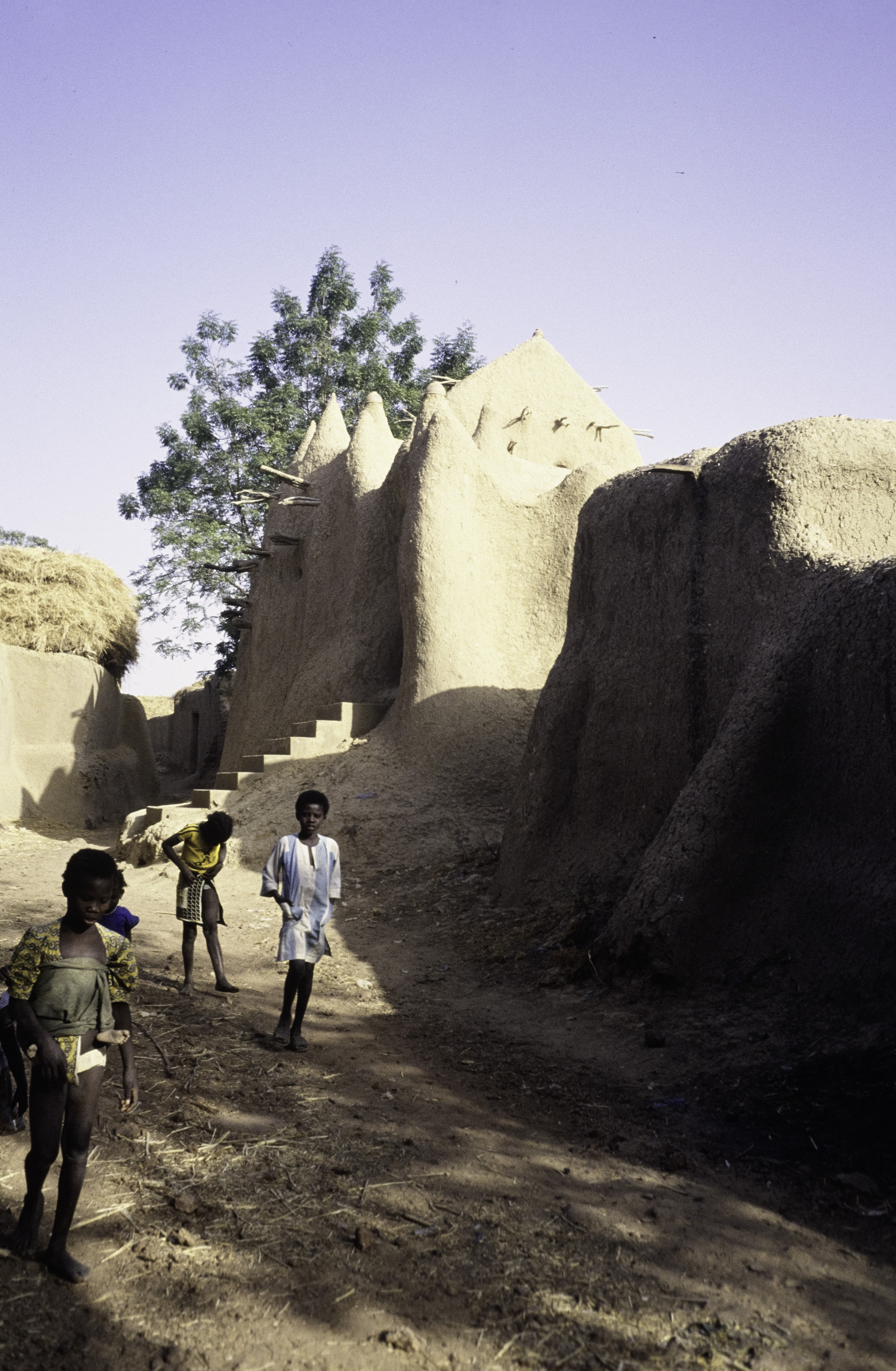
Mosque, Ségou (1983)

Great-grandson of former Ségou king Kaladian Coulibaly, Mamary Coulibaly settled in Ségou in his youth and soon became head of the Tòn, a voluntary organization for young men, taking the title of "Bitòn." Under Coulibaly's leadership, the Tòn transformed from an egalitarian society into an army supplemented with runaway slaves called the Ton djon. Prompted by popular uprising against the king of Ségou, the populace suggested he take over the leadership of the Bambara kingdom. Coulibaly quickly subdued rival chiefs of Ségou through a vote a cloture of the chiefs, and used the city as a capital for his new Bambara Empire.

Fortifying himself with defensive techniques from the Songhai tradition, Coulibaly created a large army and a navy of war canoes to patrol the Niger River, staffing both with men captured in his conquests. Coulibaly then proceeded to capture the cities of Bamako and Djenne; he also attacked Tomboctou, though he held the city only briefly. During this time he also founded the city of Bla as an outpost and armory.

He built a mosque in Ségou.

Bitòn Coulibaly was succeeded by Dinkoro Coulibaly following his death in 1755. The Coulibaly dynasty soon fell to Ngolo Diarra, a former slave and leader of the ton djon, in 1766. Slaves had the right to property, and could win their way to nobility, as Diarra did.

== Tomb ==
In 2019 Coulibaly's tomb had the inscription "Biton Mamary Coulibaly / Founder of the Kingdom / Banana of Segou Sekoro / Reign 1712-1755".

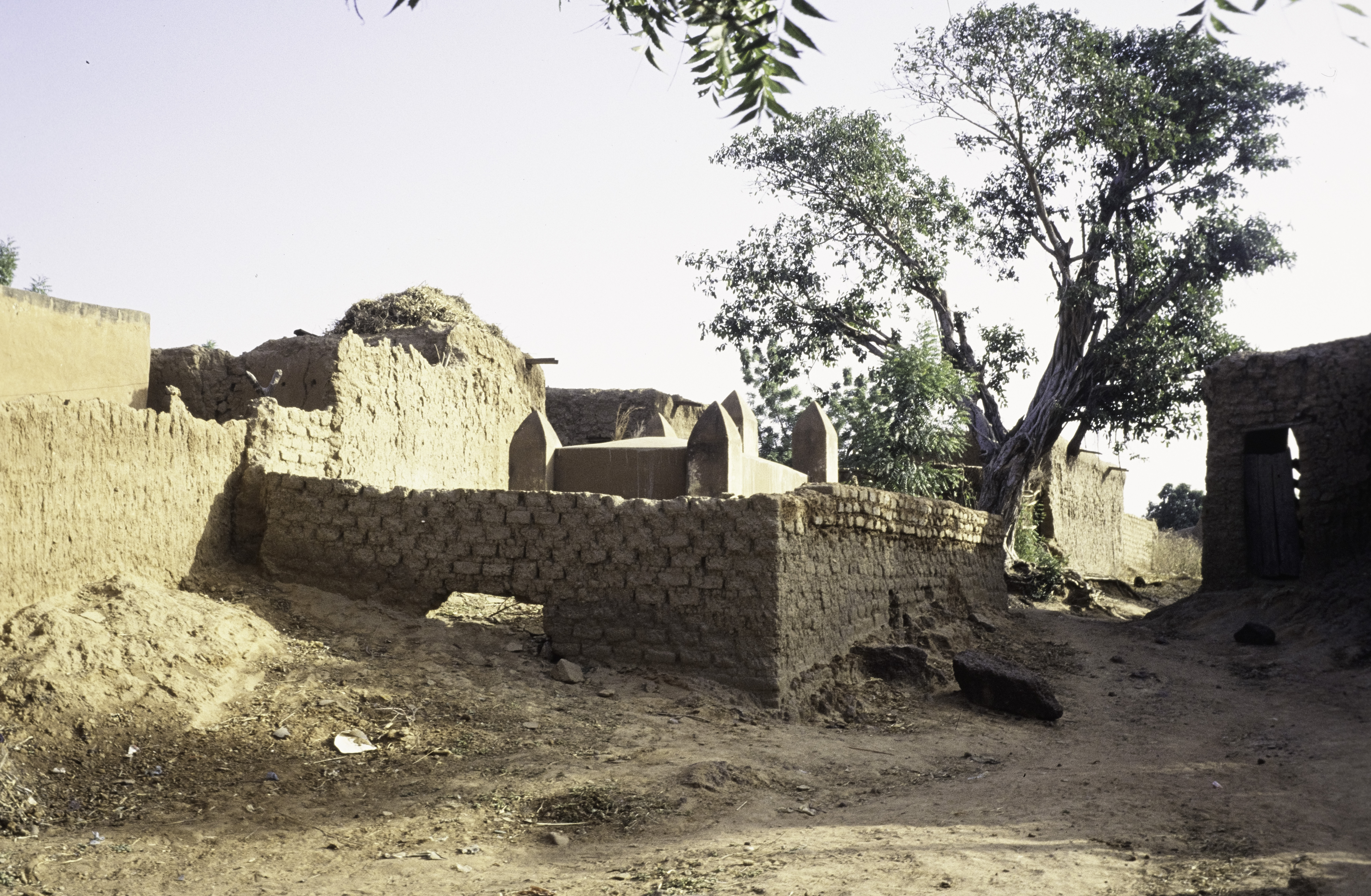
Tomb from a distance, 1983

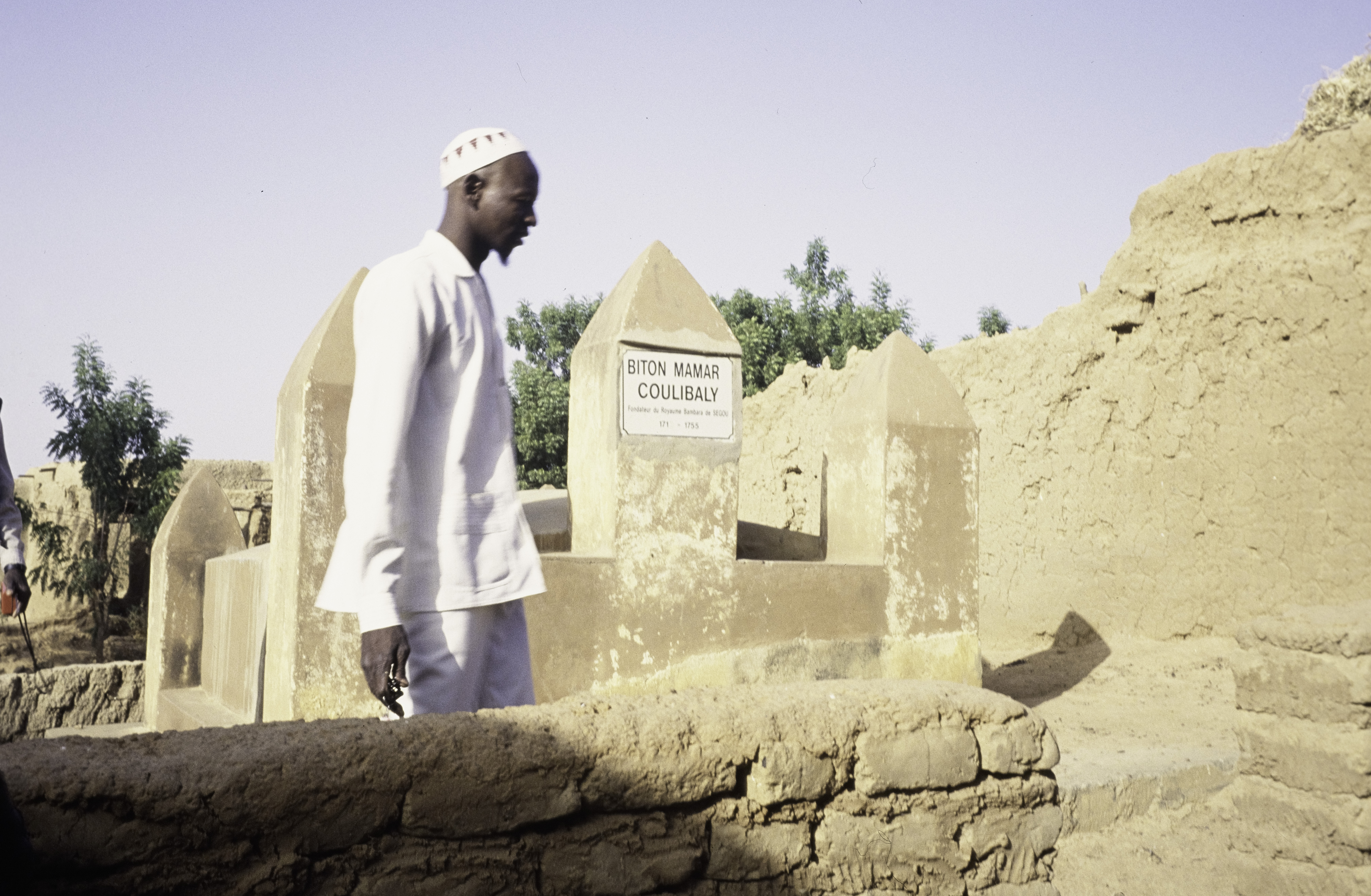
Tomb of Bitòn Coulibaly - Ségoukoro, Mali, 1983

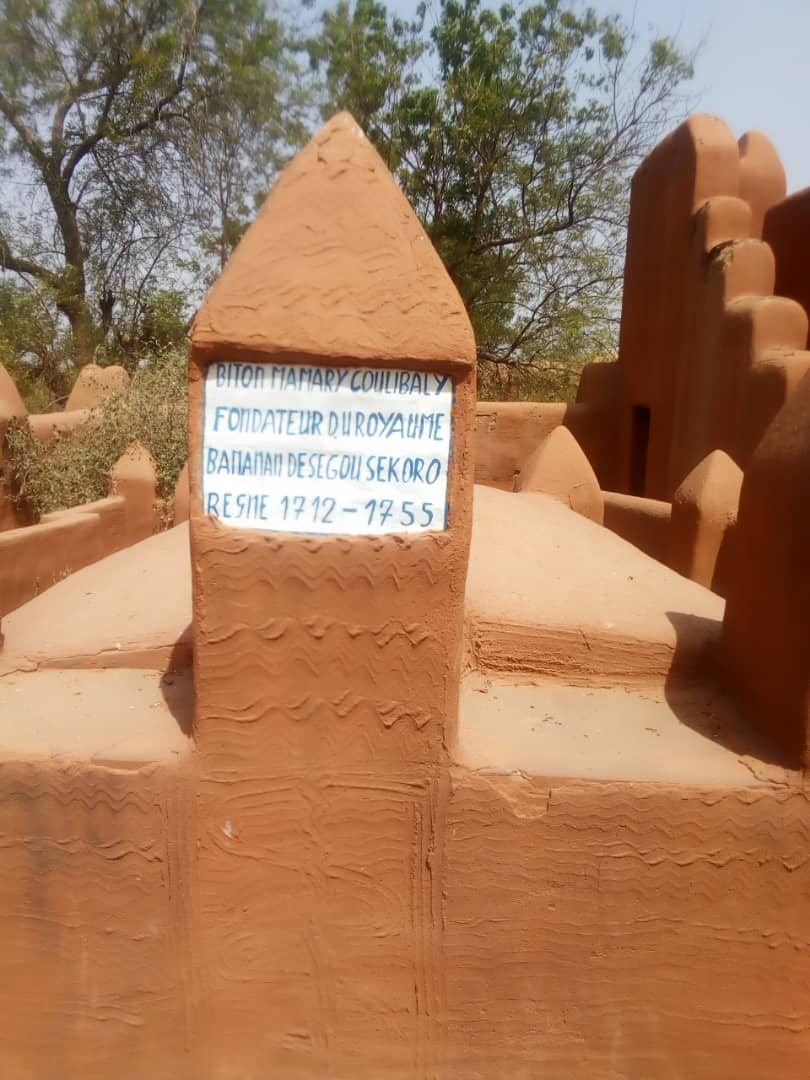
The tomb of Biton Mamary Coulibaly, 2019

== In popular culture ==
- Super Biton de Ségou, a Malian afro-jazz band, was founded in the 1960s in Ségou. Named after Bitòn Coulibaly, they are Mali's oldest dance band, and one of the oldest African orchestras.
