= Bambara people =

Ethnic group in West Africa

Bambara, Bamana
ߓߡߊߣߊ߲
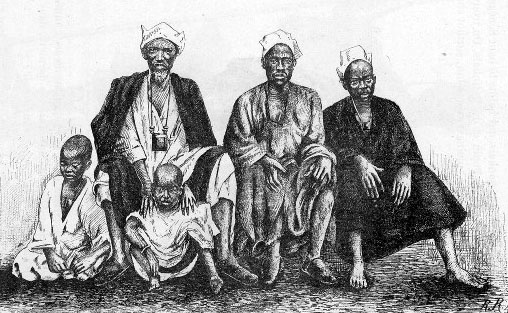
- Bambara people in upper Sénégal river valley, 1890. (illustration from Colonel Frey's Côte occidentale d'Afrique, 1890, Fig.49 p.87)

Total population
- 5,000,000 (2019)

Regions with significant populations
- Mali, Guinea, Senegal, Burkina Faso, Niger, Ivory Coast, Mauritania, Gambia, Morocco
- Mali: 6,705,796 (33.3%)
- Senegal: 91,071 (1.34%) (1988 census)
- Gambia: 22,583 (1.3%)
- Morocco: 400

Languages
- Bambara language, French, Arabic

Religion
- Sunni Islam

Related ethnic groups
- Mandinka people, Soninke people, other Mande speaking groups.

The Bambara (Bambara: ߓߡߊߣߊ߲, romanized: Bamana or ߓߊ߲ߡߊߣߊ߲ Banmana) are a Mandé ethnic group native to West Africa, primarily southern Mali, Ivory Coast, Guinea, Burkina Faso and Senegal. They have been associated with the historic Bambara Empire. Today, they make up the largest Mandé ethnic group in Mali, with 80% of the population speaking the Bambara language, regardless of ethnicity.

== Ethnonym ==
According to the Encyclopedia of Africa, "Bambara" means "unbeliever" or "infidel"; the group supposedly acquired the name because they resisted forced conversion to Islam after the religion was introduced in 1854 by Toucouleur conqueror Omar Saidou Tall.

The anthropologist Germaine Dieterlen posited an alternative explanation; suggesting that the name translates as "rejection of a master" and originates from the escape of Bambaran slaves from the Malinke Empire during the 13th century.

== History ==
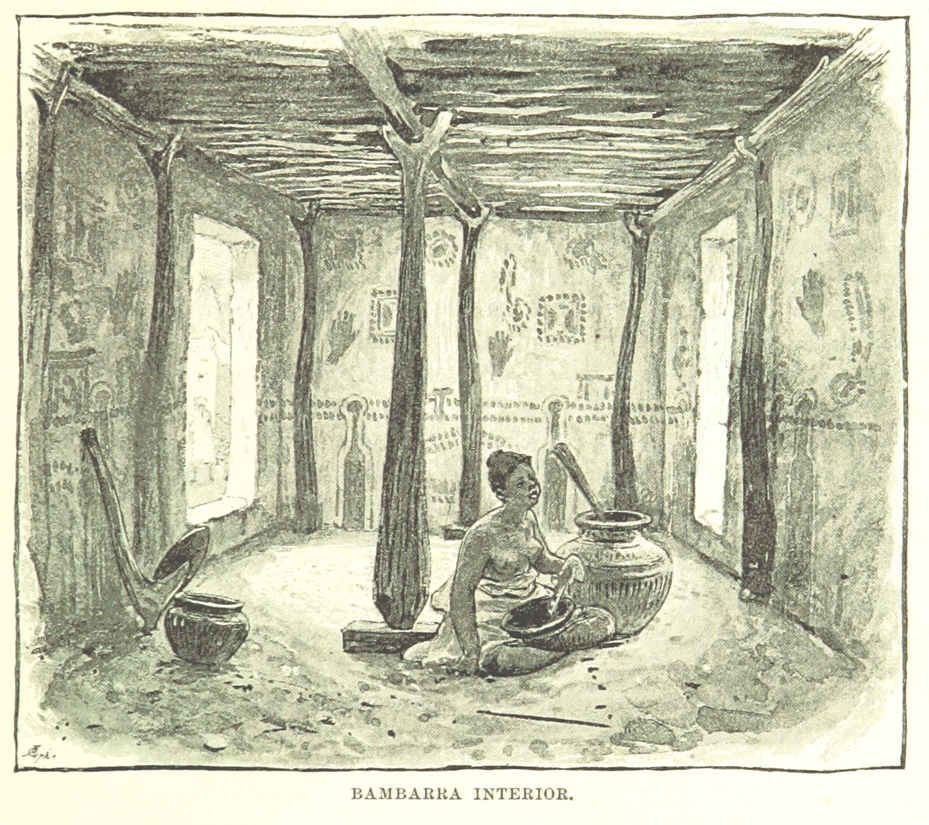
A Bambara hut.

The Bamana originated as a royal section of the Mandinka people. Both Manding and Bambara are part of the Mandé ethno-linguistic group, whose divergence is dated to at least about 7,000 years ago, and branches of which are associated with sites near Tichitt (now subsumed by the Sahara in southern Mauritania), where urban centers began to emerge by as early as 2500 BC. By 250 BC, a Mandé subgroup, the Bozo, founded the city of Djenne. Between 300 AD and 1100 AD, the Soninke Mandé dominated the Western Mali, leading the Ghana Empire. When the Nilo-Saharan Songhai Empire dissolved after 1600 AD, many Mandé-speaking groups along the upper Niger river basin turned inward. The Bamana appeared again in this milieu with the rise of a Bamana Empire in the 1740s, when the Mali Empire started to crumble around 1559.

The Bambara became both victims and victimisers of the Atlantic Slave Trade, as a result of conflicts with surrounding ethnic groups. The Islamized Mandinka people would legally acquire Bambara captives for trade with Europeans, as the Bambara were deemed as pagan under Islamic law. However, the Bambara would also make raids on their neighbours, to acquire captives that were integrated into the Bambara people. Bambara slaves had a known presence in Haiti and Louisiana.

While there is little consensus among modern historians and ethnologists as to the origins or meaning of the ethno-linguistic term, references to the name Bambara can be found from the early 18th century. In addition to its general use as a reference to an ethno-linguistic group, Bambara was also used to identify captive Africans who originated in the interior of Africa perhaps from the upper Senegal-Niger region and transported to the Americas via ports on the Senegambian coast. As early as 1730 at the slave-trading post of Gorée, the term Bambara referred simply to slaves who were already in the service of the local elites or French.

Growing from farming communities in Ouassoulou, between Sikasso and Ivory Coast, Bamana-age co-fraternities (called Tons) began to develop a state structure which became the Bambara Empire and later Mali Empire. In stark contrast to their Muslim neighbors, the Bamana state practised and formalised traditional polytheistic religion, though Muslim communities remained locally powerful, if excluded from the central state at Ségou.

The Bamana became the dominant cultural community in western Mali. The Bambara language, mutually intelligible with the Manding and Dyula languages, has become the principal inter-ethnic language in Mali and one of the official languages of the state alongside French.

== Culture ==
=== Caste ===
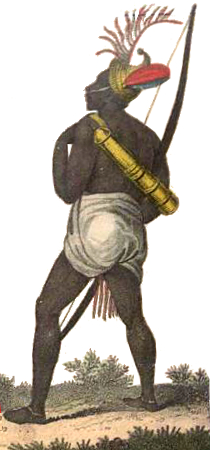
A Bambara warrior.

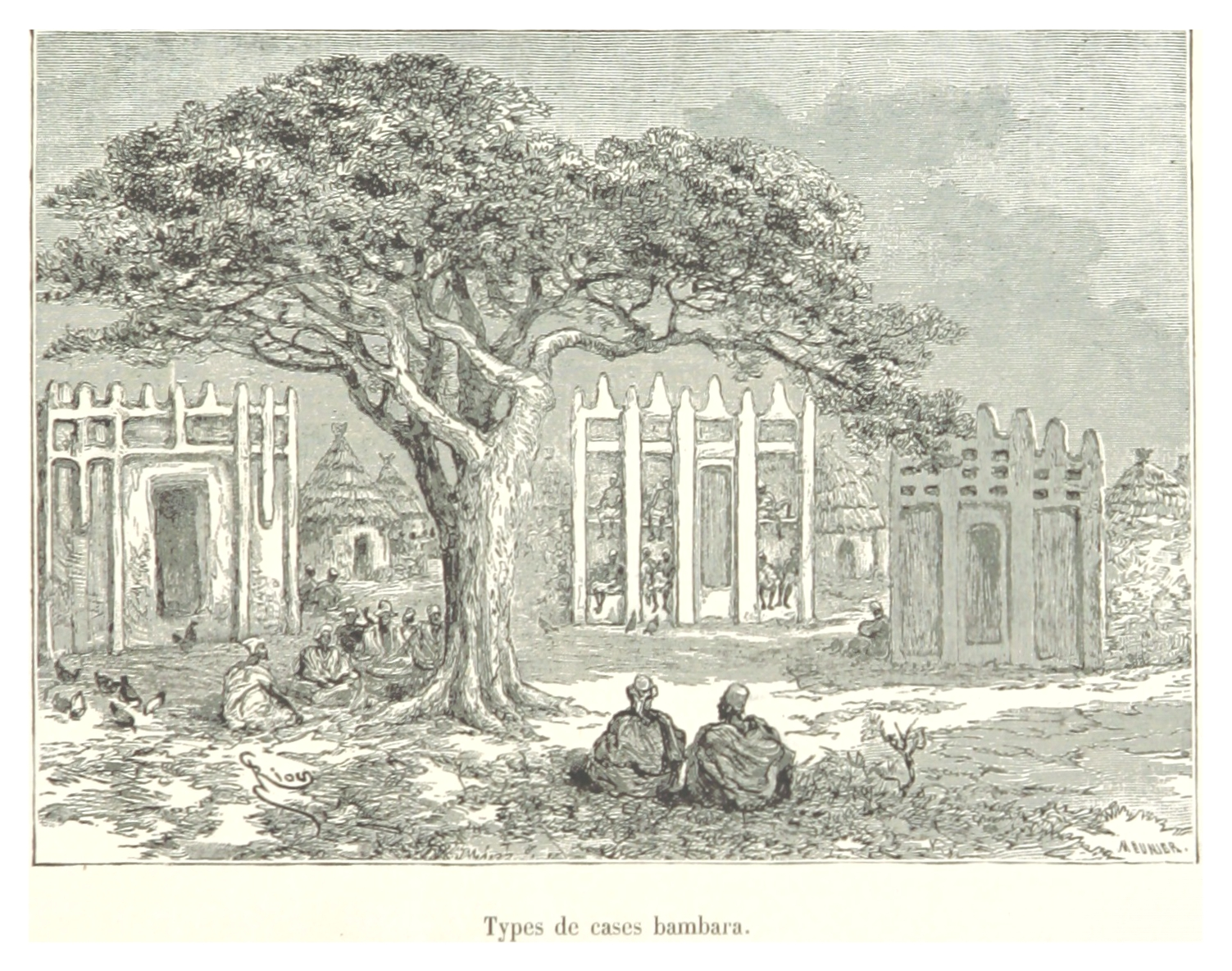
A Bambara village.

Traditionally, Mandé society is hierarchal or caste-based, with nobility and vassals. Bamana political order created a small free nobility, set in the midst of endogamous caste and ethnic variation. Both castes and ethnic groups performed vocational roles in the Bamana state, and this differentiation increased with time.

The Maraka merchants developed towns focused first on desert side trade, and latter on large-scale agricultural production using captured slaves. The Jula specialised in long-distance trade, as did Fula communities within the state, who added this to cattle herding. The Bozo ethnicity were created largely out of war captives, and turned by the state to fishing and ferrying communities.

In addition to this, the Bamana maintained internal castes, like other Mandé peoples, with griots, priests, metalworkers, and other specialist vocations remaining endogamous and living in designated areas.

Formerly, like most other African societies, they also held slaves (called "Jonw"/"Jong(o)"), often war prisoners from lands surrounding their territory. With time, and the collapse of the Bamana state, these caste differences have eroded, though vocations have strong family and ethnic correlations.

=== Religion ===
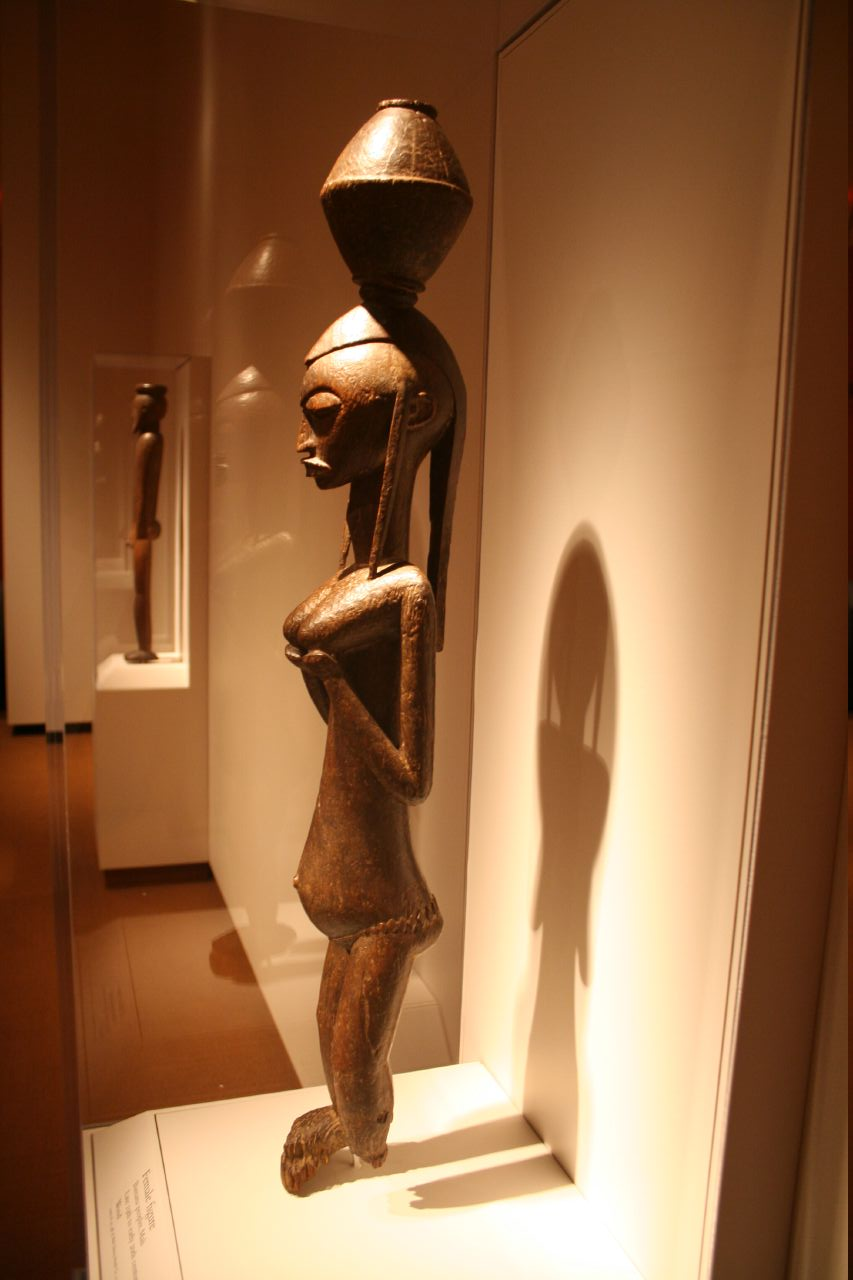
Bambara human figure, late 19th to early 20th century, Mali. Wood. African Art Museum, Smithsonian.

Most Bamana today adhere to Islam, but many still practise the traditional rituals, especially in honoring ancestors. This form of syncretic Islam remains rare, even allowing for conversions that in many cases happened in the mid to late 19th century.

=== Social structure ===
Bamana share many aspects of broader Mandé social structure. Society is patrilineal and patriarchal. Mandé culture is known for its strong fraternal orders and sororities (Ton) and the history of the Bambara Empire strengthened and preserved these orders. The first state was born as a refashioning of hunting and youth Tons into a warrior caste.

As conquests of their neighbors were successful, the state created the Jonton (Jon = slave/kjell-slave), or slave warrior caste, replenished by warriors captured in battle. While slaves were excluded from inheritance, the Jonton leaders forged a strong corporate identity. Their raids fed the Segu economy with goods and slaves for trade, and bonded agricultural laborers who were resettled by the state.

=== Ton societies ===
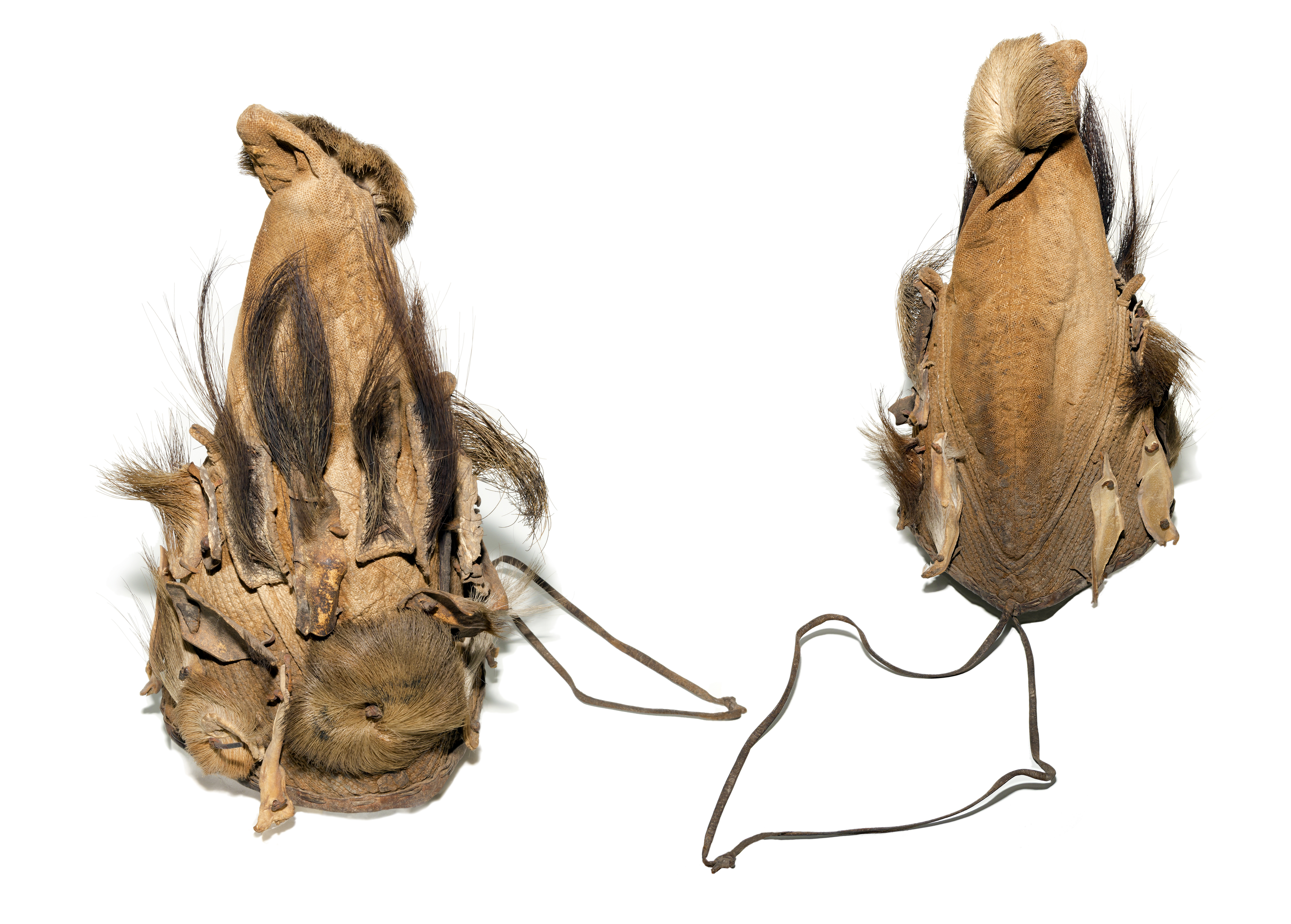
Bonnet ritual MHNT

The Bamana have continued in many places their tradition of caste and age group inauguration societies, known as the Tons. While this is common to most Mandé societies, the Ton tradition is especially strong in Bamana history. Tons can be by sex (initiation rites for young men and women), age (the earlier young men's Soli ton living separately from the community and providing farm labor prior to taking wives), or vocation (the farming Chi Wara Ton or the hunters Donzo Ton). While these societies continue as ways of socializing and passing on traditions, their power and importance faded in the 20th century.

== Art ==
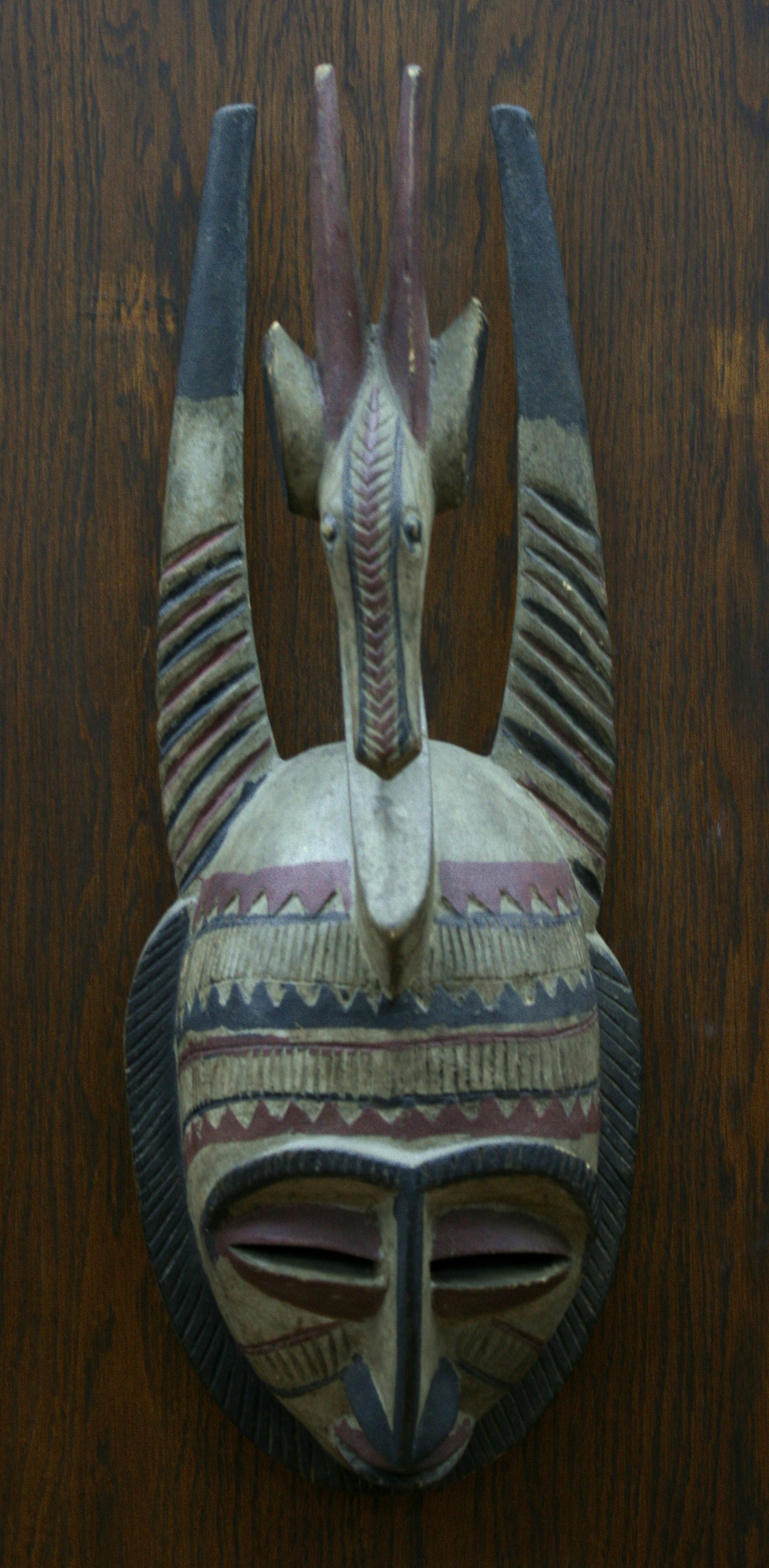
Bambara mask with a stylistic representation of an antelope, National Gallery for Foreign Art

The Bamana people adapted many artistic traditions. Artworks were created both for religious use and to define cultural and religious difference. Bamana artistic traditions include pottery, sculpture, weaving, iron figures, and masks. While the tourist and art market is the main destination of modern Bamana artworks, most artistic traditions had been part of sacred vocations, created as a display of religious beliefs and used in ritual.

Bamana forms of art include the n’tomo mask and the Tyi Warra. The n’tomo mask was used by dancers at male initiation ceremonies. The Tyi Warra (or ciwara) headdress was used at harvest time by young men chosen from the farmers association. Other Bamana statues include fertility statues, meant to be kept with the wife at all times to ensure fertility, and statues created for vocational groups such as hunters and farmers, often used as offering places by other groups after prosperous farming seasons or successful hunting parties.

=== Sculpture ===
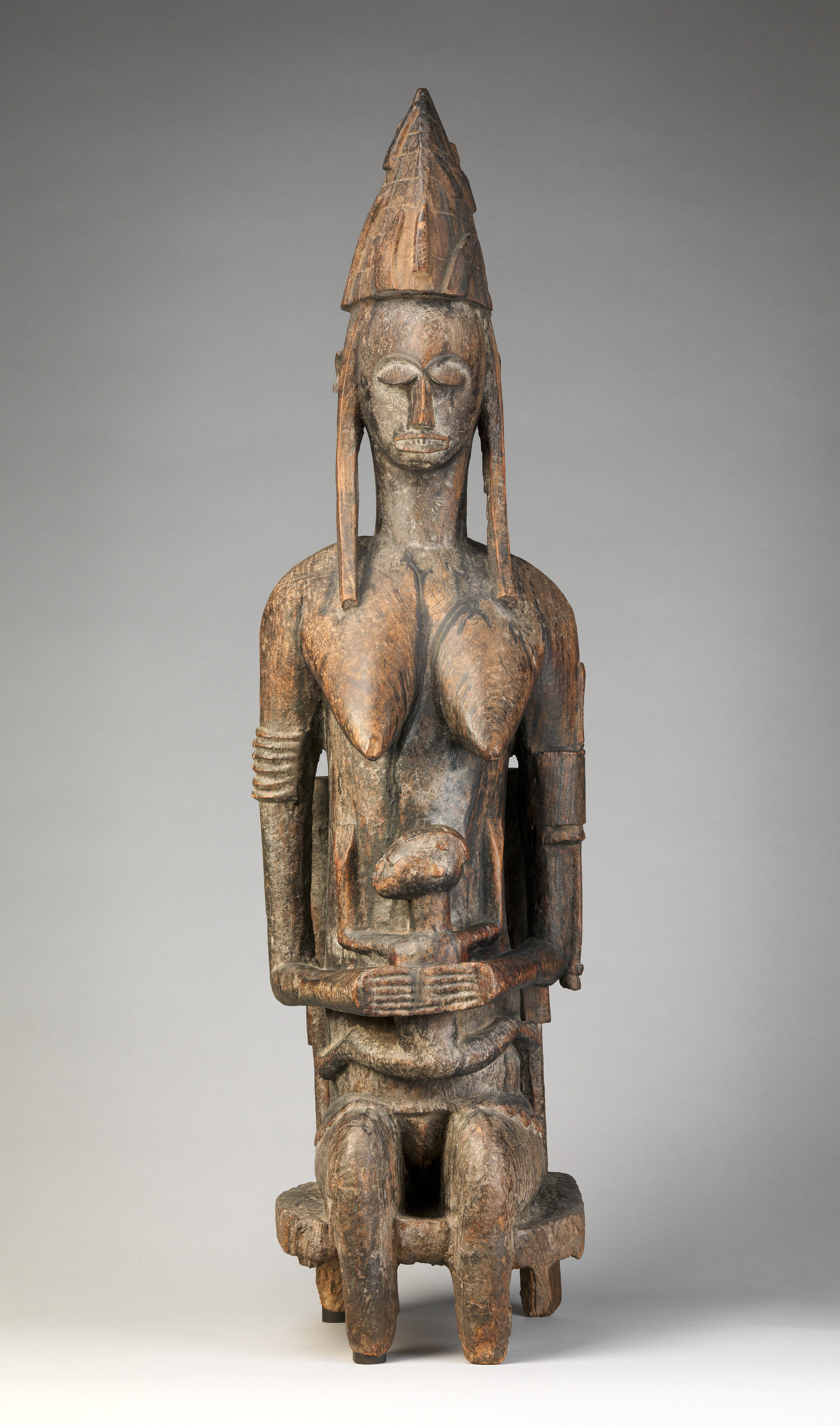
This wooden figure, in the collection of the Metropolitan Museum of Art, depicts a woman that is seen wearing a dagger strapped to her left arm and the amulet-filled cap she wears, both of which are often connected with the abilities of male hunters, and indicating that this woman has an amazing ability.

The Bamana people are known for creating wooden figures for ritualistic use.

==== Jo and Gwan association figures ====
The Bamana people from the southern area in Mali have a set of Jo and Gwan association figures (jomogoniw and gwandenw) that, rather than the figures being seen by themselves, are instead seen in groups in order to recreate the nature of their public display in the annual ceremony. The groups are made up of supporting figures that stand in front of focal sculptures, usually a seated guy with a lance and medicine horn and a seated mother with a child. Other figures can be seen in females standing, carrying vessels on their heads, males on horseback, pregnant females, males with whistles or gongs, and smaller males with their heads turned to one sided. These groups of sculptures in Bamana portray a range of social roles. By using and creating the relative proportions, postures, and gestures of each piece, it helps to give a clearer understanding of the relationships between social players in Bamana culture.

In southern Mali, there is a initiation for young men, and statues are created for this. These include the sonkalaniw, which is performed by a group of Jo initiation known as boso, and the nyeleniw, which is used in blacksmiths' Jo initiation.

== Notable people ==
- Aya Nakamura, French-Malian Singer
- Alassane Pléa
- Kaladian Coulibaly, King of Segou
- Mamary Coulibaly, Emperor
- Kalidou Koulibaly, Senegalese footballer
- Kafoumba Coulibaly
- Rokia Traoré, Malian musician
- Sammy Traoré
- Bertrand Traoré
- Alain Traoré
- Kandia Traoré
- Lassina Traoré

== See also ==
- Bambara language
- Bambara Empire
