= Ségou Empire =

West African state from 1712 to 1861

Segou Bamana Empire Bambara: ߓߊ߲ߓߊߙߊ߲߫ ߝߊ߯ߡߟߊ, romanized: Banbaran Fāmala
- 1712–1861
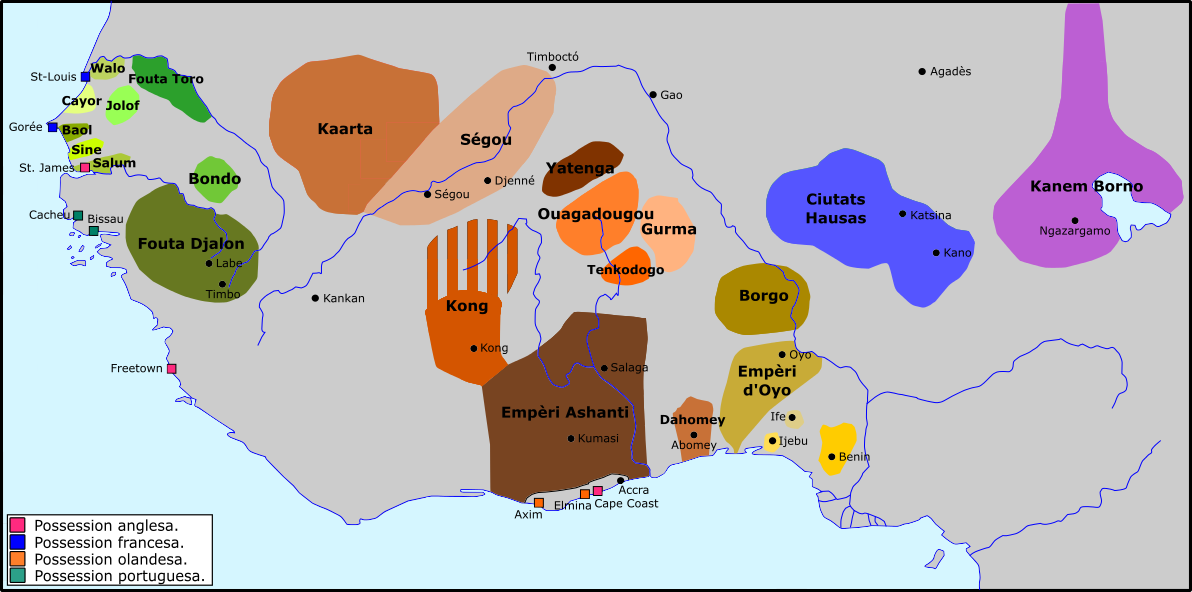
- Ségou Empire, 18th century.
- Capital: Ségou
- Common languages: Bambara
- Religion: Animism, Islam
- Government: Monarchy
- Faama
  - 1712-1755: Mamary Coulibaly
  - 1755-1757: Dinkoro Coulibaly
  - 1757-1759: Ali Coulibaly
  - 1766-1790: Ngolo Diarra
  - 1790-1808: Mansong Diarra
  - 1808-1827: Da Diarra
- Historical era: Early modern period
  - Kaladian establishes dynasty: c.1640
  - Mamari (Biton) Coulibaly takes power: 1712
  - Ngolo Diarra takes power: 1766
  - Conquest by the Toucouleur Empire: 1861
- Currency: cowries, mithqal
Preceded by	Succeeded by
Saadi dynasty	Toucouleur Empire
- Today part of: Mali

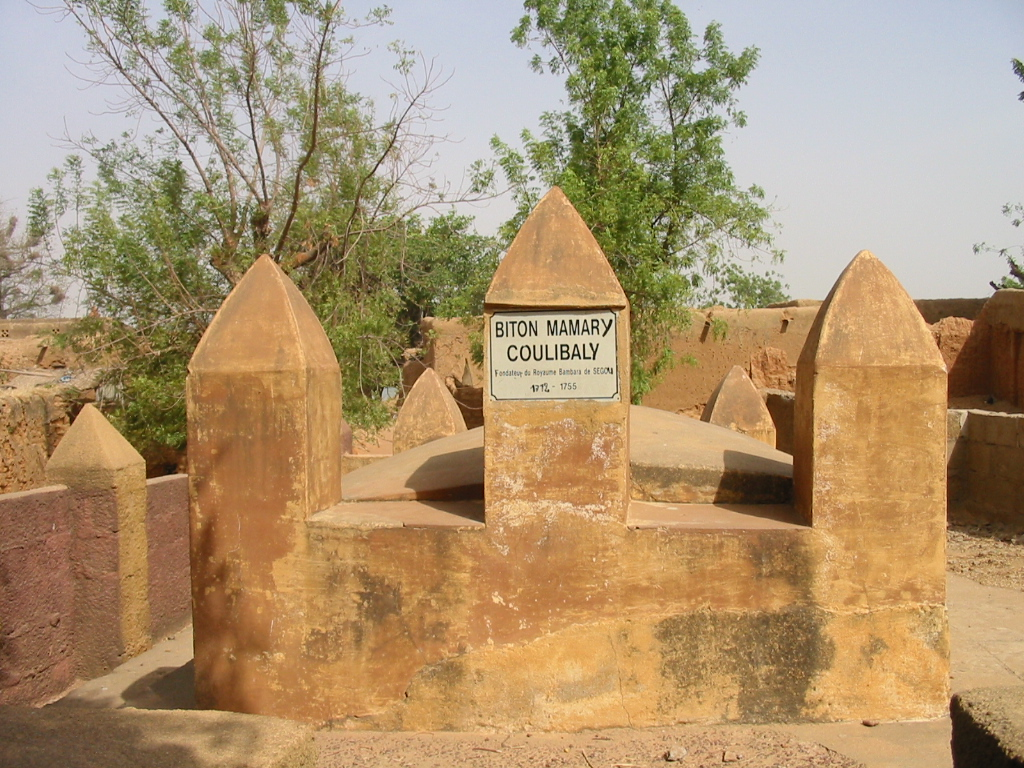
Tomb of Biton Mamary Coulibaly at Segou koro, near Ségou.

The Ségou Empire (also Bambara or Bamana Empire, Bambara: ߓߊ߲ߓߊߙߊ߲߫ ߝߊ߯ߡߟߊ, romanized: Banbaran Fāmala) was one of the largest states of West Africa in the 18th century. Along with Kaarta it was one of the most important successors of the Songhai Empire. Based on an earlier kingdom established in 1640, it grew into a powerful empire in the early 18th century under Bitòn Coulibaly. The empire existed as a centralized state from 1712 until the 1861 invasion by the Toucouleur conqueror El Hadj Umar Tall.

== History ==
=== Bitonsi ===
Around 1640, Kaladian Coulibaly, also known as Fa Sine, became the leader of a small Bambara kingdom in the city of Ségou in Mali. Though he made many successful conquests of neighboring tribes and kingdoms, he failed to set up a significant administrative framework, and the new empire disintegrated following his death (c. 1660).

In 1712 Mamari Kulubali, also known as Biton Coulibaly, Kaladian's great-grandson, was elected the leader of a youth organization known as a tòn. Mamari soon reorganized the tòn as a personal army supplemented with runaway slaves, assumed the title of bitòn, and set about overthrowing the traditional political order. He became the first Faama of Ségou, making it the capital of a new Bamana Empire.

Fortifying the capital with Songhai techniques, Bitòn Kulubali built a large army of conscripts known as the ton djon and a navy of war canoes to patrol the Niger. He introduced a novel system of taxation using the cowrie shell as currency. His successful defeat of an invasion from the Kong Empire in 1725 cemented his position. He then proceeded to launch successful assaults against his neighbors, the Fulani, the Soninke, and the Mossi, conquering Macina, Beledougou, Djenne, Bamako and Tomboctou, though he held the latter city only briefly. In 1751 he also conquered Niani, making the Mansa of the rump-state Mali Empire a vassal. During this time he founded the city of Bla as an outpost and armory.

Mamari's death in 1755 inaugurated an era of instability and civil war. Dinkoro Coulibaly reigned for a few years before being overthrown by his brother Ali. A devout Muslim, he attempted to convert the empire and was soon deposed himself.

=== Ngolosi ===
In 1766, a former slave and leader of the ton djon named Ngolo Diarra seized the throne and re-established stability, reigning for nearly thirty years of prosperity. He began a series of successful conquests, including that of Timbuktu and the Sultanate of Massina. The Ngolosi, his descendants, would continue to rule the Empire until its fall.

Ngolo's son Mansong Diarra took the throne c.1790 following his father's death in battle and a short succession dispute. During this period the Faama ruled from a massive palace in Segou and commanded a well-organized cavalry army, often used for raising tribute and taxes in the form of cowries. The capital, Segou, was a prosperous city of around 30,000 inhabitants straddling both banks of the Niger river. After Mansong's death in 1808, the empire's power progressively declined.

=== Jihad and fall ===
At the Battle of Noukouma in 1818, Bambara forces met and were defeated by Fula Muslim fighters rallied by the jihad of Cheikou Amadu (or Seku Amadu) of Massina. The Segou Empire survived but was irreversibly weakened. Seku Amadu's forces decisively defeated the Bambara, taking Djenné and much of the territory around Mopti and forming into a Massina Empire. Timbuktu would fall as well in 1845.

After 1839 the faamaw succeeded each other in rapid fashion as the tonjon leaders grew increasingly powerful, independent, and prone to intervene in succession disputes. When El Hadj Umar Tall, a Toucouleur religious leader, declared a jihad against the empire in 1859, this balkanization prevented 'faama' Ali from mounting an effective defense. Tall took Nyamina without a fight on May 25, 1860, then defeated the Bamana army at Witala in September. Ségou itself fell on March 10, 1861, marking the end of the Segou Empire.

== List of Faamas of Segou ==
=== Coulibaly dynasty, the Bitonsi ===
- Kaladian : 1652–1672. A mercenary warlord originally from Kong; overthrew the Koita dynasty of Segou.
- Danfassari : 1672–1697, established the capital at Segou-Koro
- Souma: 1697–1712
- Mamari (Biton) Coulibaly: 1712–1755
- Dinkoro Coulibaly: 1755–1757, assassinated by the ton djon
- Ali Coulibaly : 1757–1757. Muslim, deposed by the ton djon

=== Tondjon interregnum ===
- Ton-Mansa Dembelé : 1757–1760
- Kaniouba Niouma Barry: 1760–1763
- Kafa Dyougou: 1763–1766 ruled from Gassin.

=== Ngolossi ===
- Ngolo Diarra: 1766–1787
- Mansong Diarra : 1788–1808. Defeated his brother Nianankoro to take the throne. His sons would rule the empire until its end.
- Da Diarra : 1808–1827. Son of Mansong, lost control of Macina
- Tiéfolo Diarra : 1827–1839
- Nianemba Diarra: 1839–1841
- Kirango-Ba Diarra : 1841–1849
- Nalouma Kouma Diarra : 1849–1851
- Massala Demba Diarra : 1851–1854
- Torokoro Mari Diarra: 1854–1859. A Muslim friendly with El Hadj Umar Tall, he was deposed and executed.
- Ali Diarra : 1859–1861. Defeated and driven out of Segou by Umar Tall.

== Government ==
The Segou Empire was structured around traditional Bambara institutions. The most important of these was the ton, or age-group. They were in theory completely egalitarian and elected their own leaders. Through charisma and ruthless power politics, however, Biton converted this into essentially an army made up of forobadjon (nominally, slaves of the community) led by tondjons, or slaves of the ton but who were in practice a military aristocracy. Any faama strong enough to control the tondjons was in effect an absolute monarch, doling out state property as rewards for bravery. A 40-man council of state swore allegiance and obedience to him and served as a rubber stamp. Relatives were given key posts, and the faama was the head priest of powerful and important religious cults. The army was a place where ethnic and class distinctions mattered little, and capable people could rise and make their fortunes. Another traditional institution was the kòmò, a body to resolve theological concerns. The kòmò often consulted religious sculptures in their decisions, particularly the four state boliw, large altars designed to aid the acquisition of political power.

Administratively, the core of the state was in the too-daga, the area closest to Segou. The ruler's designated successor held lots of power there. Most other provinces were governed by local elites who pledged loyalty to the faama or appointed governors. The royal symbols were a bow and arrows, and a golden axe.

== Economy ==
The economy of the Segou Empire flourished through trade, especially that of the slaves captured in their many wars. One category of slave, the jonfin, could be sold; another, the jonba were put to work by the state either as laborers or as soldiers in the ton djon. The demand for slaves then led to further fighting, leaving the Bambara in a perpetual state of war with their neighbors, and slaves from the area formed the majority of those sold to European traders at the Senegal River and Gambia River trading posts.

Trade was conducted largely by Muslim maraka merchants who traded across the Sahara or towards the coast. They exchanged guns, shell money, horses, salt, gold, cloth, and slaves.

Mungo Park, passing through the Bambara capital of Ségou in 1797 recorded a testament to the Empire's prosperity:

The view of this extensive city, the numerous canoes on the river, the crowded population, and the cultivated state of the surrounding countryside, formed altogether a prospect of civilization and magnificence that I little expected to find in the bosom of Africa.

== See also ==
- Bambara language, a Mande language, spoken by 6 million people in Mali
- Bambara people, an ethnic group who represent 40% of Mali's population
- Kaarta, another Bambara kingdom of the same epoch
