= List of state leaders in the 15th century =

This is a list of state leaders of the 15th century (1401–1500) AD, excluding leaders within the Holy Roman Empire and South Asia.

These polities are generally sovereign states, but excludes minor dependent territories, whose leaders can be found listed under territorial governors in the 15th century. For completeness, these lists can include colonies, protectorates, or other dependent territories that have since gained sovereignty.

== Africa ==
=== Africa: Central ===
Angola

- Kingdom of Kongo: Kilukeni (complete list) –

- Nanga, Manikongo (1410s)
- Nlaza, Manikongo (1430s)
- Nkuwu a Ntinu, Manikongo (1450s–1470)
- João I, Manikongo (1470–1509)

Cameroon

- Kingdom of Bamum (complete list) –

- Nchare Yen, Mfon (1394–1418)
- Ngoupou, Mfon (1418–1461)
- Monjou, Mfon (1461–1498)
- Mengap, Mfon (1498–1519)

São Tomé and Príncipe

- Portuguese São Tomé and Príncipe (complete list) –

Colony, 1470–1951
For details see the Kingdom of Portugal under Southwest Europe

=== Africa: East ===
Great Lakes area

Rwanda

- Kingdom of Rwanda (complete list) –

- Cyilima Rugwe, Mwami (?–c.1378)
- Kigeli I Mukobanya, Mwami (1378–1418)
- Mibambwe I Sekarongoro I Mutabazi, Mwami (15th century)
- Yuhi wa II Gahima II, Mwami (15th century)
- Ndahiro II Cyamatare, Mwami (1477–1510)

South Sudan

- Shilluk Kingdom –

- Nyikang, Rädh (c.1490–1517)

Uganda

- Buganda (complete list) –

- Kimera, Kabaka (c.1374–c.1404)
- Ttembo, Kabaka (c.1404–c.1434)
- Kiggala, Kabaka (c.1434–c.1464, c.1484–c.1494)
- Kiyimba, Kabaka (c.1464–c.1484)
- Kayima, Kabaka (c.1494–c.1524)

Horn of Africa area

Ethiopia

- Ethiopian Empire: Solomonic dynasty (complete list) –

- Dawit I, Emperor (1382–1413)
- Tewodros I, Emperor (1413–1414)
- Yeshaq I, Emperor (1414–1429)
- Andreyas, Emperor (1429–1430)
- Takla Maryam, Emperor (1430–1433)
- Sarwe Iyasus, Emperor (1433)
- Amda Iyasus, Emperor (1433–1434)
- Zara Yaqob, Emperor (1434–1468)
- Baeda Maryam I, Emperor (1468–1478)
- Eskender, Emperor (1478–1494)
- Amda Seyon II, Emperor (1494)
- Na'od, Emperor (1494–1508)

- Kingdom of Kaffa (complete list) –

- Shongetato (also known as the Girra king), King (1425–1460)
- Odhe/Addiotato, King (1460–1495)
- Sadi or Shaddi/Shaditato, King (1495–1530)

- Ennarea (complete list) –

- Kaba Seyon, Hinnare-tato (c.1450–1530)

Somalia

- Adal Sultanate: Walashma dynasty (complete list) –

- Sabr ad-Din II, Sultan (1415–1422)
- Mansur ad-Din, Sultan (1422–1424)
- Jamal ad-Din II, Sultan (1424–1433)
- Badlay ibn Sa'ad ad-Din, Sultan (1433–1445)
- Muhammad ibn Badlay, Sultan (1445–1472)
- Shams ad-Din ibn Muhammad, Sultan (1472–1488)
- Muhammad ibn Azhar ad-Din, Sultan (1488–1518)

- Sultanate of Ifat: Walashma dynasty (complete list) –

- Sa'ad ad-Din II, Sultan (1374–1403)

- Warsangali Sultanate –

- Garaad Siciid, Sultan (1392–1409)
- Garaad Ahmed, Sultan (1409–1430)
- Garaad Siciid II, Sultan (1430–1450)
- Garaad Mohamud II, Sultan (1450–1479)
- Garaad Ciise II, Sultan (1479–1487)
- Garaad Omar, Sultan (1487–1495)
- Garaad Ali Dable, Sultan (1491–1503)

=== Africa: Northeast ===
Egypt

- Abbasid Caliphate, Cairo (complete list) –

- al-Musta'in, Caliph (1406–1414)
- al-Mu'tadid II, Caliph (1414–1441)
- al-Mustakfi II, Caliph (1441–1451)
- al-Qa'im, Caliph (1451–1455)
- al-Mustanjid, Caliph (1455–1479)
- al-Mutawakkil II, Caliph (1479–1497)
- al-Mustamsik, Caliph (1497–1508, 1516–1517)

- Mamluk Sultanate: Burji dynasty (complete list) –

- An-Nasir Faraj, Sultan (1399–1405)
- Izz ad-Din Abd al-Aziz, Sultan (1405)
- An-Nasir Faraj, Sultan (1405–1412)
- Al-Musta'in (Cairo), Sultan (1412)
- Shaykh al-Mahmudi, Sultan (1412–1421)
- Al-Muzaffar Ahmad, Sultan (1421)
- Sayf ad-Din Tatar, Sultan (1421)
- An-Nasir ad-Din Muhammad, Sultan (1421–1422)
- Barsbay, Sultan (1422–1438)
- Al-Aziz Jamal ad-Din Yusuf, Sultan (1438)
- Sayf ad-Din Jaqmaq, Sultan (1438–1453)
- Al-Mansur Fakhr-ad-Din Uthman, Sultan (1453)
- Sayf ad-Din Inal, Sultan (1453–1461)
- Al-Mu'ayyad Shihab al-Din Ahmad, Sultan (1461)
- Sayf ad-Din Khushqadam, Sultan (1461–1467)
- Sayf ad-Din Bilbay, Sultan (1467)
- Timurbugha, Sultan (1467–1468)
- Qaitbay, Sultan (1468–1496)
- An-Nasir Muhammad ibn Qaitbay, Sultan (1496–1498)
- Abu Sa'id Qansuh, Sultan (1498–1500)
- Al-Ashraf Janbalat, Sultan (1500–1501)

=== Africa: Northcentral ===
Ifriqiya

- Hafsid dynasty (complete list) –

- Abd al-Aziz II, Khalif (1394–1434)
- Muhammad III, Khalif (1434–1436)
- Uthman, Khalif (1436–1488)
- Abu Zakariya Yahya, Khalif (1488–1489)
- Abd al-Mu'min (Hafsid), Khalif (1489–1490)
- Abu Yahya Zakariya, Khalif (1490–1494)
- Muhammad IV, Khalif (1494–1526)

=== Africa: Northwest ===
Morocco

- Morocco (complete list) –

Marinid dynasty

- Abu Said Uthman III, Sultan (1398–1420)
- Abd al-Haqq II, Sultan (1420–1465)

Idrisid interlude

- Muhammad ibn Ali Amrani-Joutey, Sultan (1465–1471)

Wattasid dynasty

- Muhammad ibn Yahya, Sultan (1472–1505)

=== Africa: South ===
Mozambique

- Portuguese Mozambique (complete list) –

Colony, 1498–1972
For details see the Kingdom of Portugal under Southwest Europe

Zimbabwe

- Kingdom of Mutapa (complete list) –

- Nyatsimba Mutota, Mwenemutapa (c.1430)
- Matope Nyanhehwe Nebedza, Mwenemutapa (c.1450–1480)
- Mavura Maobwe, Mwenemutapa (1480)
- Nyahuma Mukombero, Mwenemutapa (1480–1490)
- Changamire, Mwenemutapa (1490–1494)
- Chikuyo Chisamarengu, Mwenemutapa (1494–c.1530)

- Rozvi Empire (complete list) –

- Changamire I, King (c.1480–1494)
- Changamire II, King (1494–1530)

=== Africa: West ===
Benin

- Kingdom of Benin (complete list) –

- Orobiru, Oba (1397–1434)
- Uwaifiokun, Oba (1434–1440)
- Ezoti, Oba (1473–1474)
- Ewuare I, Oba (1440–1473)
- Olua, Oba (1475–1480)
- Ozolua, Oba (1480–1504)

Burkina Faso

- Mossi Kingdom of Nungu (complete list) –

- Tenin, Nunbado (1395–1425)
- Tokurma, Nunbado (1425–1470)
- Gima, Nunbado (1470–1520)

Cape Verde

- Portuguese Cape Verde (complete list) –

Colony, 1462–1951
For details see the Kingdom of Portugal under Southwest Europe

Guinea-Bissau

- Portuguese Guinea (complete list) –

Colony, 1474–1951
For details see the Kingdom of Portugal under Southwest Europe

Mali

- Mali Empire: Keita dynasty (complete list) –

- Musa III, Mansa (1400–c.1440)
- Uli II, Mansa (c.1440–1481)
- Mahmud II, Mansa (1481–1496)
- Mahmud III, Mansa (1496–1559)

- Songhai Empire (complete list) –

Sonni dynasty

- Sunni Souleïmân-Dâma, King (?–c.1464)
- Sonni Ali, King (1464–1492)
- Sonni Baru, King (1492–1493)

Askiya dynasty

- Askia Mohammad I, King (1493–1529)

Nigeria

- Bornu Empire (Kanem–Bornu) (complete list) –

- Bir III, Mai (1383–1415)
- Uthman III Kaliwama, Mai (1415–1415)
- Dunama III, Mai (1415–1417)
- Abdallah III Dakumuni, Mai (1417–1425)
- Ibrahim II, Mai (1425–1433)
- Kaday III, Mai (1433–1434)
- Ahmad Dunama IV, Mai (1434–1438)
- Muhammad II, Mai (1438)
- Amr, Mai (1438–1439)
- Muhammad III, Mai (1439)
- Ghazi, Mai (1439–1444)
- Uthman IV, Mai (1444–1449)
- Umar II, Mai (1449–1450)
- Muhammad IV, Mai (1450–1455)
- Ali Gazi, Mai (1455–1487)
- Idris Katakarmabe, Mai (1487–1509)

- Oyo Empire (complete list) –

- Kori, Alaafin (c.1400–?)
- Oluaso, Alaafin (?–c.1500)

- Sultanate of Kano (complete list) –

- Kanejeji, Sultan (1390–1410)
- Umaru, Sultan (1410–1421)
- Daud, Sultan (1421–1438)
- Abdullah Burja, Sultan (1438–1452)
- Dakauta, Sultan (1452)
- Atuma, Sultan (1452)
- Yaquled (1452–1463)
- Muhammad Rumfa, Sultan (1463–1499)
- Abdullahi dan Rumfa, Sultan (1499–1509)

- Kingdom of Nri (complete list) –

- Eze Nri Ọmalonyeso, King (1391–1464)
- Eze Nri Anyamata, King (1465–1511)

Senegal

- Jolof / Wolof Empire (complete list) –

- N'Diklam Sare, Buur-ba (1390–1420)
- Tyukuli N'Diklam, Buur-ba (1420–1440)
- Leeyti Tyukuli, Buur-ba (1440–1450)
- N'Dyelen Mbey Leeyti, Buur-ba (1450–1465)
- Birayma N'dyeme Eler, Buur-ba (1465–1481)
- Tase Daagulen, Buur-ba (1481–1488)
- Birayma Kuran Kan, Buur-ba (1488–1492)
- Bukaar Biye-Sungule, Buur-ba (1492–1527)

- Saloum (complete list) –

- Mbegan Ndour, Maad Saloum (c.1493)

== Americas ==
=== Americas: North ===
Mexico

- Azcapotzalco –

- Tezozomoc, Tlatoani (1353/71–1426)
- Tayatzin, Tlatoani (1426)
- Maxtla, Tlatoani (1426–1428/31)
- Temozomoc II, Tlatoani (1474–1499)
- Don Carlos Oquiztzin, Tlatoani (1499–c.1520)

- Mixtec –

- Dzawindanda / Atonal (II), ruler (?–1458)

- Tarascan state (complete list) –

- Hiripan, Cazonci (?–c.1430)
- Tangáxuan I, Cazonci (1430–1454)
- Tzitzipandáquare, Cazonci (1454–1479)
- Zuangua, Cazonci (1479–1520)

- Tenochtitlan (complete list) –

under the Tepanec suzerainty

- Huitzilihuitl, Tlatoani (1395-c.1417)
- Chimalpopoca, Tlatoani (1417–1426)

- Tenochtitlan of the Aztec Empire (complete list) –

Emperors of the Triple Alliance (Aztec Empire)

- Itzcoatl, Hueyi Tlatoani(1427–1440)
- Moteuczomatzin Ilhuicamina, Hueyi Tlatoani ()
- Axayacatl, Hueyi Tlatoani (1469–1481)
- Tizoc, Hueyi Tlatoani (1481–1486)
- Ahuitzotl, Hueyi Tlatoani (1486–1502)

- Tepanec –

- Tetzotzomoc, Tlatoani (1367–1426)
- Tayauh, Tlatoani (1426)
- Maxtla, Tlatoani (1426–1428)

- Tlacopan –

- Totoquilhuaztli, Tlatoani (c.1400–1430)
- Totoquilhuaztli, Tlatoani (1430–1469)
- Chimalpopoca, Tlatoani (1469–?)

- Zapotec civilization –

- Zaachila –

- Zaachila Yoo, King (1386–1415)
- Zaachila II, King (1415–1454)
- Zaachila III, King (1454–1487)
- Cocijoeza / Cosijoeza, King (1487–1521)

=== Americas: South ===
Incas

- Kingdom of Cusco (complete list) –

- Yawar Waqaq, Inca (c.1380–1410)
- Viracocha, Inca (c.1410–1438)

- Inca Empire (complete list) –

- Pachacuti, Sapa Inca (1438–1471/72)
- Topa, Sapa Inca (1471–1493)
- Huayna Capac, Sapa Inca (1493–1525)

Colombia

- Muisca Confederation

- Zaque (complete list) –

- Goranchacha, Zaque (?)
- Hunzahúa, Zaque (?-1470)
- Michuá, Zaque (1470-1490)
- Quemuenchatocha, Zaque (1490-1537)

- Zipa (complete list) –

- Menquetá, Zipa (?)
- Meicuchuca, Zipa (1450-1470)
- Saguamanchica, Zipa (1470-1490)
- Nemequene, Zipa (1490-1514)

== Asia ==
=== Asia: Central ===
Kazakhstan

- Western Chagatai Khanate (complete list) –

From 1370 on, the Chagatai Khans were puppets of Timur
- Mahmud, Khan (1384–1402)

- Moghulistan, Eastern Chagatai Khanate (complete list) –

- Shams-i-Jahan, Khan (1399–1408)
- Muhammad Khan (Khan of Moghulistan), Khan (1408–1415)
- Naqsh-i-Jahan, Khan (1415–1418)
- Awais Khan, Khan (1418–1421)
- Sher Muhammad, Khan (1421–1425)
- Awais Khan, Khan (1425–1429)
- Satuq Khan, Khan (1429–1434)
- Esen Buqa II, Khan (1429–1462)

- Moghulistan, (complete list) –

- Yunus, Khan of Western Moghulistan (1462–1469)
- Dost Muhammad, Khan of Eastern Moghulistan (1462–1468)
- Kebek Oghlan, Khan of Eastern Moghulistan (1469)
- Yunus, Khan of All Moghulistan (1469–1487)
- Ahmad Alaq, Khan of Eastern Moghulistan (1487–1503)
- Mahmud, Khan of Western Moghulistan (1487–1508)

- Kazakh Khanate (complete list) –

- Kerei, Khan (1456–1473)
- Janibek, Khan (1473–1480)
- Burunduk, Khan (1480–1511)

- Kara Del

- Engke Temür, Khan (1393–1405)
Vassal of China, 1404–1430s
- Toqto, Khan (1405–1411)
- Mengli Temür, Khan (1411–1425)
Vassal of the Northern Yuan dynasty, 1430s–1455
- Budaširi, Khan (1425–1439)
- Khalīl sulṭān, Khan (1439–1457)
Vassal of China, 1455–1457
- Bürege, Khan (1457–1460)
- Nugandaširi, Khan (1460–1472)
- Baγ Temür, Rival Khan (1466–1472)
- Qanšin, Khan (1472–1488)
- Engke Bolad, Khan (1488–1492, 1493–1497)
- Šamba, Khan (1492–1493, 1497–1505)

Russia

- Golden Horde (complete list) –

- Shadi Beg, Khan (1399–1407), actual ruler was Edigu
- Pulad, Khan (1407–1410), actual ruler was Edigu
- Temür, Khan (1410–1412)
- Jalal ad-Din khan, Khan (1411–1412)
- Karim Berdi ibn Tokhtamysh, Khan (1412–1414)
- Kebek ibn Tokhtamysh, Khan (1414)
- Chokra ibn Akmyl, Khan (1414–1417)
- Jabbar Berdi, Khan (1417–1419)
- Olugh Mokhammad, Khan (1419–1421, 1428–1433)
- Dawlat Berdi, Khan (1419–1421, 1427–1432)
- Baraq, Khan (1422–1427)
- Seyid Akhmed, Khan (1433–1435)
- Küchük Muhammad, Khan (1435–1459)

- Great Horde (complete list) –

- Mahmud, Khan (1459–1465)
- Ahmed, Khan (1465–1481)
- Shayk Ahmad, Khan (1481–1498, 1499–1502)
- Murtada, Khan (1498–1499)

- Khanate of Sibir (complete list) –

- Tokhtamysh, Khan (1396–1406)
- Chekre Khan, Khan (1407–1413)
- Hadji Muhammad, Khan (1420–1428)
- Abu'l-Khayr, Khan (1428–1468)
- Mar, Khan (1468–1480)
- Ibak, Khan (1468–1495)
- Mamuq of Kazan, Khan (1495–1496)
- Abalak of Sibir, Khan (1496–1501)
- Muhammad Taibuga, Khan (1495–1502)

- White Horde (complete list) –

- Baraq, Khan (1423–1428)
- Muhammed, Khan (1428–1431)
- Mustafa, Khan (1431–1446)

Tibet

- Guge

- rNam rgyal lde, King (1396?–1424)
- Nam mkha'i dBang po Phun tshogs lde, King (1424–1449)
- rNam ri Sang rgyas lde, King (1449–?)
- bLo bzang Rab brtan, King (?–c.1485)
- sTod tsha 'Phags pa lha, King (c.1485–post–1499)

- Phagmodrupa dynasty (complete list) –

- Drakpa Gyaltsen, Monarch (1385–1432)
- Drakpa Jungne, Monarch (1432–1445)
- Kunga Lekpa, Monarch (1448–1481)
- Ngagi Wangpo, Monarch (1481–1491)
- Tsokye Dorje, Monarch (1491–1499)
- Ngawang Tashi Drakpa, Monarch (1499–1554)

- Rinpungpa (complete list) –

- Norzang, Monarch (1435–1466)
- Kunzang, Monarch (1466–c.1479)
- Donyo Dorje, Monarch (c.1479–1512)

Uzbekistan

- Khanate of Bukhara: Shaybanid dynasty –

- Abu'l-Khayr, Khan (1428–1468)
- Abul-Khayr, Khan (1428–1468)
- Shah Budagh, Khan (1468)
- Muhammad Shayabak, Khan (1500–1510)

=== Asia: East ===
China: Ming dynasty

- Ming dynasty (complete list) –

- Jianwen, Emperor (1398–1402)
- Yongle, Emperor (1402–1424)
- Hongxi, Emperor (1424–1425)
- Xuande, Emperor (1425–1435)
- Yingzong, Emperor (1435–1449, 1457–1464)
- Jingtai, Emperor (1449–1457)
- Yingzong, Emperor (1435–1449, 1457–1464)
- Chenghua, Emperor (1464–1487)
- Hongzhi, Emperor (1487–1505)

Japan: Main

- Ashikaga shogunate of Japan

- Emperors (complete list) –

- Go-Komatsu, Emperor (1392–1412)
- Shōkō, Emperor (1412–1428)
- Go-Hanazono, Emperor (1428–1464)
- Go-Tsuchimikado, Emperor (1464–1500)
- Go-Kashiwabara, Emperor (1500-1526)

- Shōguns –

- Yoshimochi, Shōgun (1395–1423, 1425-1428)
- Yoshikazu, Shōgun (1423–1425)
- Yoshinori, Shōgun (1428–1441)
- Yoshikatsu, Shōgun (1442–1443)
- Yoshimasa, Shōgun (1449–1474)
- Yoshihisa, Shōgun (1474–1489)
- Yoshitane, Shōgun (1490–1493)
- Yoshizumi, Shōgun (1493–1508)

Japan: Ryukyu

- Chūzan: Ryukyu Kingdoms of the Sanzan period –

Tributary state of the Ming dynasty
- Bunei, Chief (1398–1406)

- Nanzan: Ryukyu Kingdoms of the Sanzan period –

Tributary state of the Ming dynasty
- Oueishi, Chief (1388–1402)
- Ououso, Chief (1403–1413)
- Tafuchi, Chief (1413–1414)
- Taromai, Chief (1415–1429)

- Hokuzan: Ryukyu Kingdoms of the Sanzan period –

Tributary state of the Ming dynasty
- Hananchi, Chief (1401–1416)

- Ryukyu Kingdom –

First Shō dynasty
- Shō Shishō, Chief (1406–1421)
- Shō Hashi, Chief (1422–1429), King (1429–1439)
Tributary state of the Ming dynasty, 1429–1644
- Shō Chū, King (1439–1444)
- Shō Shitatsu, King (1444–1449)
- Shō Kinpuku, King (1449–1453)
- Shō Taikyū, King (1454–1460)
- Shō Toku, King (1460–1469)
Second Shō dynasty
- Shō En, King (1469–1476)
- Shō Sen'i, King (1477)
- Shō Shin, King (1477–1526)

Korea

- Joseon (complete list) –

- Taejong, King (1400–1418)
- Sejong the Great, King (1418–1450)
- Munjong, King (1450–1452)
- Danjong, King (1452–1455)
- Sejo, King (1455–1468)
- Yejong, King (1468–1469)
- Seongjong, King (1469–1494)
- Yeonsangun, King (1494–1506)

Mongolia

- Alliance of the Four Oirat (complete list) –

- Batula, leader (1399–1408)
- Togoon Taishi, leader (1408–1438)
- Esen, leader (1438–1454)
- Amasanj, leader (1454–1455)
- Ishtömör (Ush-Temür), leader (1455–1469)

- Northern Yuan dynasty (complete list) –

- Gün Temür, Khan (1400–1402)
- Örüg Temür, Khan (1402–1408)
- Öljei Temür, Khan (1408–1412)
- Delbeg, Khan (1412–1415)
- Oyiradai, Khan (1415–1425)
- Adai, Khan (1425–1438)
- Tayisung Toghtoa Bukha, Khan (1433–1452)
- Agbarjin, Khan (1453)
- Esen taishi, Khan (1453–1454)
- Markörgis, Khan (1454–1465)
- Molon, Khan (1465–1466)
- Manduul, Khan (1475–1478)
- Dayan, Khan (1478–1516)

=== Asia: Southeast ===
Brunei

- Bruneian Empire (complete list) –

- Muhammad Shah, Sultan (1368–1402)
- Abdul Majid Hassan, Sultan (1402–1408)
- Ahmad, Sultan (1408–1425)
- Sharif Ali, Sultan (1425–1432)
- Sulaiman, Sultan (1432–1485)
- Bolkiah, Sultan (1485–1524)

Cambodia

- Khmer Empire (complete list) –

- In Reachea, King (1394–c.1421)
- Ponhea Yat, King of Khmer Empire (1405–1431), King of Cambodia (1431–1463)

- Kingdom of Cambodia: Middle Period (complete list) –

- Ponhea Yat, King of Khmer Empire (1405–1431), King of Cambodia (1431–1463)
- Noreay Ramathipatei, King (1463–1469)
- Reachea Ramathipatei, King (1469–1475)
- Srei Soriyotei II, King (1472–1475)
- Thommo Reachea I, King (1476–1504)

Indonesia

Indonesia: Java

- Sunda Kingdom (complete list) –

- Prabu Raja Wastu, Maharaja (1371–1475)
- Prabu Susuk tunggal, Maharaja (1475–1482)
- Sri Baduga, Maharaja (1482–1521)

- Majapahit: Rajasa dynasty (complete list) –

- Wikramawardhana, King (1389–1429)
- Suhita, Queen (1429–1447)
- Kritavijaya, King (1447–1451)
- Rajasavardhana, King (1451–1453)
- Bhre Wengker, Purvavisesha, King (1456–1466)
- Singhavikramavardhana, King (1466–1468/78)
- Bhre Kertabhumi, King (1468–1478)
- Girindrawardhana, King (1478–1489)
- Prabu Udara, King (1489–1517)

- Tuban –

- Sira Lena, King (14th/15th century)
- Raden Arya Dikara, King (15th century)
- Arya Teja, King (15th century)

- Sultanate of Cirebon (complete list) –

- Cakrabuana, Prince (1445–1479)
- Sunan Gunungjati, Sultan (1479–1568)

Indonesia: Sumatra

- Samudera Pasai Sultanate (complete list) –

- Zainal Abidin I, Sultan (1349–1406)
- Nahrasyiyah, Queen (1406–1428)
- Zainal Abidin II, Sultan (1428–1438)
- Shalahuddin, Sultan (1438–1462)
- Ahmad II, Sultan (1462–1464)
- Abu Zaid Ahmad III, Sultan (1464–1466)
- Ahmad IV, Sultan (1466–1466)
- Mahmud, Sultan (1466–1468)
- Zainal Abidin III, Sultan (1468–1474)
- Muhammad Syah II, Sultan (1474–1495)
- Al-Kamil, Sultan (1495–1495)
- Adlullah, Sultan (1495–1506)

Indonesia: Kalimantan (Borneo)

- Negara Daha –

- Sari Kaburangan, Maharaja (15th century)
- Sukarama, Maharaja (15th century)
- Mangkubumi, Maharaja (15th/16th century)

Indonesia: Sulawesi

- Gowa-Tallo –

- I Puang Lowe Lembang, King (14th/15th century)
- I Tuniatabanri, King (15th century)
- Karampang ri Gowa, King (15th century)
- Tunatangka Lopi, King (15th century)
- Batara Gowa, King (15th/16th century)

- Luwu –

- Tanra Balusu, Datu (1365–1402)
- Toampanangi, Datu (1402–1426)
- Batara Guru II, Datu (1426–1458)
- La Mariawa, Datu (1458–1465)
- Risaolebbi, Datu (1465–1507)

Indonesia: Lesser Sunda Islands

- Bali Kingdom: Samprangan (complete list) –

- Dalem Samprangan, King (14th/15th century)

Indonesia: Maluku Islands

- Sultanate of Bacan (complete list) –

- Muhammad Bakir, Sultan (c.1500)

- Sultanate of Tidore (complete list) –

- Matagena, King (1372–1405)
- Jamaluddin/Ciri Leliati, Sultan (1495–1512)

- Sultanate of Ternate (complete list) –

- Komala Pulu/ Bessi Muhammad Hassan, King (1377–1432)
- Marhum/ Gapi Baguna II, King (1432–1486)
- Zainal Abidin, Sultan (1486–1500)
- Bayanullah, Sultan (1500–1522)

Laos

- Lan Xang (complete list) –

- Samsenethai, King (1373–1416)
- Lan Kham Deng, King (1416–1428)
- Phommathat, King (1428–1429)
- Yukhon, King (1429–1430)
- Khon Kham, King (1430–1432)
- Kham Tam Sa, King (1432)
- Lusai, King (1432–1433)
- Khai Bua Ban, King (1433–1436)
- Kham Keut, King (1436–1438)
- Nang Keo Phimpha, Queen (1438)
- Chakkaphat Phaen Phaeo, King (1442–1480)
- Souvanna Banlang, King (1479–1486)
- La Sen Thai, King (1485–1496)
- Somphou, King (1496–1501)

Malaysia: Peninsula

- Kedah Sultanate (complete list) –

- Sulaiman Shah I, Sultan (1373–1423)
- Ataullah Muhammad Shah I, Sultan (1423–1473)
- Muhammad Jiwa Zainal Adilin Mu'adzam Shah I, Sultan (1473–1506)

- Kelantan Sultanate: Jambi dynasty (complete list) –

- Baki Shah, Sultan (1362–1418)
- Sadik Muhammad Shah, Sultan (1418–1429)
- Iskandar Shah, Sultan (1429–1467)
- Mansur Shah, Sultan (1467–1522)

- Malacca Sultanate

- Sultans –

- Parameswara, Raja of Singapura (1389–1398), Sultan of Malacca (1400–1414)
- Megat Iskandar Shah, Sultan (1414–1424)
- Muhammad Shah, Sultan (1424–1444)
- Abu Syahid Shah, Sultan (1444–1446)
- Muzaffar Shah, Sultan (1445–1459)
- Mansur Shah, Sultan (1459–1477)
- Alauddin Riayat Shah, Sultan (1477–1488)
- Mahmud Shah, Sultan (1488–1511, 1513–1528)

- Bendaharas –

- Tun Perpatih Permuka Berjajar, Bendahara (1400–1412)
- Tun Perpatih Sedang, Bendahara (?–1445)
- Tun Ali, Bendahara (1445–1456)
- Tun Perak, Bendahara (1456–1498)
- Tun Perpatih Putih, Bendahara (1498–1500)

- Old Pahang Kingdom –

- Parameswara Teluk Chini, Maharaja (c.1411)
- Dewa Sura, Maharaja (?–1454)

- Pahang Sultanate (complete list) –

- Muhammad Shah, Sultan (1470–1475)
- Ahmad Shah, Sultan (1475–1495)
- Abdul Jamil Shah, Sultan (1495–1512)
- Mansur Shah I, Sultan (1495–1519)

Myanmar / Burma

- Kingdom of Ava (complete list) –

- Minkhaung I, King (1400–1421)
- Thihathu, King (1421–1425)
- Min Hla, King (1425)
- Kale Kye-Taung Nyo, King (1425–1426)
- Mohnyin Thado, King (1426–1439)
- Minye Kyawswa I, King (1439–1442)
- Narapati I, King (1442–1468)
- Thihathura, King (1468–1480)
- Minkhaung II, King (1480–1501)
- Thihathura II, Co-King (1485–1501)

- Hanthawaddy kingdom (complete list) –

- Razadarit, King (1384–1421)
- Binnya Dhammaraza, King (1421–1424)
- Binnya Ran I, King (1424–1446)
- Binnya Waru, King (1446–1451)
- Binnya Kyan, King (1451–1453)
- Leik Munhtaw, King (1453–1454)
- Shin Sawbu, Queen (1454–1471)
- Dhammazedi, King (1471–1492)
- Binnya Ran II, King (1492–1526)

- Kengtung (complete list) –

- 艾乌萨, Saopha (1390–1403)
- 伊康伽, Saopha (1403–1416)
- Sao Shan, Saopha (1416–1441)
- Sao Shan Sili, Saopha (1441–1456)
- 艾劳康, Saopha (1456–1474)
- Ai Lao (艾劳), Saopha (1474–1501)

- Mongyang –

- Sawlon the Elder, (Note: According to (Fernquest 2006: 36) Sawlon became saopha of Mohnyin c. 1482 and died in 1532, meaning he ruled for 50 years. Zatadawbon Yazawin (Zata 1960: 47) says Sawlon was born only in 1486. It means the Sawlon who came to power in 1482 was likely Sawlon's father.) Saopha (c.1482–?)

- Kingdom of Mrauk U (complete list) –

- Min Saw Mon, King (1429–1433)
- Min Khayi, King (1433–1459)
- Ba Saw Phyu, King (1459–1482)
- Min Dawlya, King (1482–1492)
- Ba Saw Nyo, King (1492–1494)
- Min Ran Aung, King (1494)
- Salingathu, King (1494–1502)

- Prome Kingdom (complete list) –

- Thado Minsaw, King (1482–1526)

Philippines

- Tondo (complete list) –

- Gambang, Rajah (c.1390–1417)
- Suko, Rajah (1417–1430)
- Lontok, Rajah (1430–1450)
- Dayang Kalangitan, Queen (1450–c.1515)

- Madja-as (complete list) –

- Kalantiaw, Datu (1365–1437)
- Manduyog, Datu (1437–?)
- Padojinog, Datu (15th/16th century)

- Rajahnate of Cebu –

- Bantug, Rajah (c.15th century)
- Parang the Limp, Rajah (15th/16th century)

- Caboloan (complete list) –

- Kamayin, King (1406–1408)
- Taymey, King (1408–1409)
- Liyu, King (1409–?)

- Sultanate of Sulu (complete list) –

- Sharif ul-Hāshim, Sultan (1405–?)
- Kamal ud-Din, Sultan (1480–1505)

Thailand

- Lan Na: Mangrai dynasty (complete list) –

- Saenmueangma, King (1385–1401)
- Samfangkaen, King (1402–1441)
- Tilokkarat, King (1441–1487)
- Yotchiangrai, King (1487–1495)
- Kaew, King (1495–1525)

- Sukhothai Kingdom (complete list) –

- Maha Thammaracha III, King (1400–1419)
- Maha Thammaracha IV, King (1419–1438)

- Ayutthaya Kingdom (complete list) –

Uthong dynasty
- Ramrachathirat, King (1395–1409)
Suphannaphum dynasty
- Intharacha, King (1409–1424)
- Borommarachathirat II, King (1424–1448)
- Borommatrailokkanat, King (1448–1488)
- Borommaracha III, King (1488–1491)
- Ramathibodi II, King (1491–1529)

Vietnam

- Champa (complete list) –

- Jaya Simhavarman V, King (1400–1441)
- Maija Vijaya, King (1441–1446)
- Moho Kouei-Lai, King (1446–1449)
- Moho Kouei-Yeou, King (1449–1458)
- Moho P'an-Lo-Yue, King (1458–1460)
- P'an-Lo T'ou-Ts'iuan, King (1460–1471)

- Đại Việt: Hồ dynasty (complete list) –

- Hồ Quý Ly, Emperor (1400–1401)
- Hồ Hán Thương, Emperor (1401–1407)

- Đại Việt: Later Trần dynasty (complete list) –

- Giản Định Đế, Emperor (1407–1409)
- Trùng Quang Đế, Emperor (1409–1414)
- Trần Cảo, (puppet) Emperor (1426–1428)

- Đại Việt: Later Lê dynasty (complete list) –

- Lê Lợi, Emperor (1428–1433)
- Lê Thái Tông, Emperor (1433–1442)
- Lê Nhân Tông, Emperor (1442–1459)
- Lê Nghi Dân, Emperor (1459–1460)
- Lê Thánh Tông, Emperor (1460–1497)
- Lê Hiến Tông, Emperor (1497–1504)

=== Asia: West ===
Oman

- Nabhani dynasty (complete list) –

- Makhzum bin al Fallah, Malik (1406–1435)
- Abul Hassan of Oman, Malik (1435–1451)
- Omar bin al Khattab, Malik (1451–1490)
- Omar al Sharif, Malik (1490–1500)
- Muhammad bin Ismail, Malik (1500–1529)

Turkey

- Ottoman Empire

- Sultans –

- Bayezid I, Sultan (1389–1402)
- Mehmed I, Sultan (1413–1421)
- Murad II, Sultan (1421–1444, 1446–1451)
- Mehmed II, Sultan (1444–1446, 1451–1481)
- Bayezid II, Sultan (1481–1512)

- Grand Viziers –

- Zagan Pasha, Grand Vizier (1453–1456)
- Veli Mahmud Pasha, Grand Vizier (1456–1466)
- Rum Mehmed Pasha, Grand Vizier (1466–1469)
- Ishak Pasha, Grand Vizier (1469–1472)
- Veli Mahmud Pasha, Grand Vizier (1472–1474)
- Gedik Ahmed Pasha, Grand Vizier (1474–1477)
- Karamani Mehmed Pasha, Grand Vizier (1477–1481)
- Ishak Pasha, Grand Vizier (1481–1482)
- Koca Davud Pasha, Grand Vizier (1482–1497)
- Hersekzade Ahmed Pasha, Grand Vizier (1497–1498)
- Çandarlı Ibrahim Pasha the Younger, Grand Vizier (1498–1499)
- Yakub Pasha, Grand Vizier (1499–1501)

Yemen

- Kathiri State of Seiyun –

- Badr as-Sahab ibn al-Habrali Bu Tuwairik, Sultan (1395–1430)
- Muhammad ibn 'Ali, Sultan (c.1430–c.1450)
- Dscha'far ibn 'Abdallah, Sultan (c.1493)

- Yemeni Zaidi State (complete list) –

- al-Mansur Ali bin Salah ad-Din, Imam (1391–1436)
- al-Hadi Ali, Imam (1393–1432)
- al-Mahdi Salah ad-Din, Imam (1436–1445)
- al-Mansur an-Nasir, Imam (1436–1462)
- al-Mutawakkil al-Mutahhar, Imam (1436–1474)
- al-Mu’ayyad Muhammad, Imam (1462–1503)
- an-Nasir Muhammad bin Yusuf, Imam (1474–1488)
- al-Hadi Izz ad-Din, Imam (1474–1495)
- al-Mansur Muhammad, Imam (1475–1504)
- an-Nasir al-Hasan, Imam (1495–1523)

== Europe ==
=== Europe: Balkans ===
- Principality of Achaea (complete list) –

- Pedro de San Superano, Prince (1396–1402)
- Maria, Princess (1402–1404)
- Centurione, Prince (1404–1430)

- Duchy of the Archipelago (complete list) –

- Giacomo I, Duke (1397–1418)
- Giovanni II, Duke (1418–1433)
- Giacomo II, Duke (1433–1447)
- Gian Giacomo, Duke (1447–1453)
- Guglielmo II, Duke (1453–1463)
- Francesco II, Duke (1463)
- Giacomo III, Duke (1463–1480)
- Giovanni III, Duke (1480–1494)
- Francesco III, Duke (1500–1511)

- Byzantine Empire (complete list) –

- Manuel II Palaiologos, Emperor (1391–1425)
- Andronikos V Palaiologos, Emperor (c.1403–1407)
- John VIII Palaiologos, Emperor (1425–1448)
- Constantine XI Palaiologos, Emperor (1449–1453)

- Despotate of the Morea (complete list) –

- Theodore I Palaiologos, Despot (1383–1407)
- Theodore II Palaiologos, Despot (1407–1443)
- Constantine Palaiologos, Despot (1428–1449)
- Thomas Palaiologos, Despot (1428–1460)
- Demetrios II Palaiologos, Despot (1449–1460)

- Hospitaller Rhodes: Knights Hospitaller (complete list) –

- Philibert de Naillac, Grand Master (1396–1421)
- Anton Flavian de Ripa, Grand Master (1421–1437)
- Jean de Lastic, Grand Master (1437–1454)
- Jacques de Milly, Grand Master (1454–1461)
- Piero Raimondo Zacosta, Grand Master (1461–1467)
- Giovanni Battista Orsini, Grand Master (1467–1476)
- Pierre d'Aubusson, Grand Master (1476–1503)

- Moravian Serbia/Serbian Despotate (complete list) –

- Stefan Lazarević, Prince (1389–1402), Despot (1402–1427)
- Đurađ Branković, Despot (1427–1456)
- Lazar Branković, Despot (1456–1458)
- Stefan Branković, Despot (1458–1459)
- Stephen Tomašević, Despot (1459)

- Republic of Ragusa (complete list) –

- Vittorio Bobali, Rector (1403–1417)
- Džono Andra Bobali and Simo Benessa, Rector (1500–1501)

=== Europe: British Isles ===
Scotland

- Kingdom of Scotland (complete list) –

- Robert III, King (1390–1406)
- James I, King (1406–1437)
- James II, King (1437–1460)
- James III, King (1460–1488)
- James IV, King (1488–1513)

England and Ireland

- Kingdom of England and Lordship of Ireland (complete list) –

- Henry IV, King and Lord (1399–1413)
- Henry V, King and Lord (1413–1422)
- John of Lancaster, Regent (1422–1429)
- Humphrey, Duke of Gloucester, Regent (1422–1437)
- Henry Beaufort, Regent (1422–1437)
- Richard Plantagenet, Regent (1454–1456)
- Henry VI, King and Lord (1422–1461, 1470–1471)
- Edward IV, King and Lord (1461–1470, 1471–1483)
- Edward V, King and Lord (1483)
- Richard III, King and Lord (1483–1485)
- Henry VII, King and Lord (1485–1509)

Ireland

- Airgíalla (complete list) –

- Pilib Ruadh mac Briain, King (1371–1403)
- Ardghal mac Briain, King (1403–1416)
- Brian mac Ardghail, King (1416–1442)
- Ruaidhri mac Ardghail, King (1442–1446)
- Aodh Ruadh mac Ruaidhri, King (1446–1453)
- Feidhlimidh mac Briain, King (1453–1466)
- Eochan mac Ruaidhri, King (1466–1467)
- Reamonn mac Ruaidhri, King (1467–1484)
- Aodh Óg mac Aodha Ruaidh, King (1485–1496)
- Brian mac Reamoinn, King (1496–1497)
- Rossa mac Maghnusa, King (1497–1513)

- East Breifne (complete list) –

- Maelmordha, ruler (1403–1411)
- Richard, ruler (1411–1418)
- Owen, ruler (1418–1449)
- Farrell, ruler (1450)
- John, ruler (1450–1460)
- Cathal O'Reilly, ruler (1467)
- Turlough, ruler (1468–1487)
- John, son of Turlough O'Reilly, ruler (1487–1491)
- John, son of Cathal O'Reilly, ruler (1491–1510)

- West Breifne (complete list) –

- Tigernán mór Ó Ruairc, King (1376–1418)
- Aodh buidhe Ó Ruairc, King (1418–1419)
- Tadhg Ó Ruairc, King (1419–1424)
- Art Ó Ruairc, King (1419–1424)
- Tadhg Ó Ruairc, King (1424–1435)
- Lochlann Ó Ruairc, King (1435–1458)
- Donnchadh bacagh Ó Ruairc, King (1435–1445)
- Donnchadh Ó Ruairc, King (1445–1449)
- Tigernán óg Ó Ruairc, King (1449–1468)
- Donnchadh losc Ó Ruairce, King (1468–1476)
- Domnall Ó Ruairc, King (1468–1476,)
- Feidhlimidh Ó Ruairc, King (1476–1500)
- Eóghan Ó Ruairc, King (1500–1528)

- Leinster (complete list) –

- Art Óg mac Murchadha Caomhánach, King (1375–1417)
- Donnchadh mac Art mac Murchadha Caomhánach, King (1417–1478)
- Domhnall Riabhach mac Murchadha Caomhánach, King (1478)
- Muircheartach mac Donnchadh mac Murchadha Caomhánach, King (1478–1512)

- Magh Luirg (complete list) –

- Conchobair Óg mac Diarmata, King (1398–1404)
- Ruaidri Caech mac Diarmata, King (1404–1421)
- Tomaltach an Einigh mac Diarmata, King (1421–1458)
- Aedh mac Diarmata, King (1458–1465)
- Conochobar Óg mac Diarmata, King (1456–1478)
- Ruaidri Óg mac Diarmata, King (1478–1486)
- Conchobair mac Diarmata, King (1486–1497)
- Tadhg mac Diarmata, King (1497–1499)
- Cormac mac Diarmata, King (1499–1528)

- Síol Anmchadha (complete list) –

- Eoghan Mór Ó Madadhan, Lord (1371–1410)
- Murcadh Ó Madadhan, Lord (1410–1451)
- Eoghan Carrach Ó Madadhan, Lord (1451–?)
- Murchadh Reagh Ó Madadhan, Lord (?–1475)
- Owen Ó Madadhan, Lord (1475–c.1479)
- Breasal Ó Madadhan, Lord (c.1479–1526)

=== Europe: Central ===
- Holy Roman Empire, Kingdom of Germany (complete list, complete list) –

- Rupert, King (1400–1410)
- Jobst of Moravia, contested King (1410–1411)
- Sigismund, Holy Roman Emperor (1433–1437), King (1410–1437)
- Albert II, King (1438–1439)
- Frederick III, Holy Roman Emperor (1452–1493), King (1440–1493)
- Maximilian I, Emperor Elect (1508–1519), King (1486–1519)

Austria

- Habsburg monarchy (complete list) –

Habsburg monarchs ruled under numerous simultaneous titles

- Frederick III, (1452–1493)
- Maximilian I, (1493–1519)

Hungary

- Kingdom of Hungary (1301–1526) (complete list) –

- Sigismund, King (1387–1437)
- Albert, King (1437–1439)
- Ladislaus V, King (1440–1457)
- Vladislaus I, King (1440–1444)
- Matthias I, King (1458–1490)
- Vladislaus II, King (1490–1516)

Poland

- Kingdom of Poland (1385–1569) (complete list) –

- Władysław II Jagiełło, King (1386–1434)
- Władysław III of Varna, King (1434–1444)
- Casimir IV, King (1447–1492)
- John I Albert, King (1492–1501)

- Duchy of Opole (complete list) –

- Władysław II, Duke (1356–1401)
- Bernard, co-Duke (1396–1400)
- Bolko IV, Duke (1396–1437)
- Jan I, co-Duke (1437–1439)
- Nicholas I, Duke (1437–1476)
- Louis, co-Duke (1476)
- Nicholas II, co-Duke (1476)
- Jan II the Good, Duke (1476–1532)

- Duchy of Masovia: Płock and Rawa (complete list) –

- Siemowit IV the Younger, Duke of Płock and Rawa (1381–1426)
- Trojden II, co-Duke of Płock and Rawa (1426–1427)
- Siemowit V, co-Duke of Płock and Rawa (1426–1434), Duke of Rawa (1434–1442)
- Casimir II, co-Duke of Płock and Rawa (1426–1434), Duke of Bełz (1434–1442)
- Władysław I, co-Duke of Płock and Rawa (1426–1434), Duke of Płock (1434–1442), of Płock and Rawa-Rawa (1442–1455)
- Margareta of Opava-Ráciborz, Duchess of Rawa-Gostynin (1442–1459)
- Anna of Oleśnica, Paul Giżycki, Regents of Płock and Rawa-Rawa (1455–1459)
- Siemowit VI, co-Duke of Płock and Rawa (1455–1462)
- Władysław II, co-Duke of Płock and Rawa (1459–1462)
- Casimir III, co-Duke of Warsaw (1454–1462), of Masovia (1462–1471), Duke of Płock (1471–1475)
- Janusz II, co-Duke of Warsaw (1454–1462), of Masovia (1462–1471), Duke of Płock (1475–1495)

- Duchy of Masovia: Warsaw (complete list) –

- Janusz I the Elder, Duke (1381–1429)
- Anna of Lithuania, Regent (1429–1436)
- Bolesław IV, Duke (1429–1454)
- Barbara Aleksandrówna, Regent (1454–1462)
- Paul Giżycki, Regent (1454–1462)
- Casimir III, co-Duke of Warsaw (1454–1462), of Masovia (1462–1471), Duke of Płock (1471–1475)
- Bolesław V, co-Duke of Warsaw (1454–1462), of Masovia (1462–1471), Duke of Warsaw (1471–1488)
- Janusz II, co-Duke of Warsaw (1454–1462), of Masovia (1462–1471), Duke of Płock (1475–1495)
- Konrad III the Rudy, co-Duke of Warsaw (1454–1462), of Masovia (1462–1471), Duke of Czersk (1471–1495), of Warsaw (1488–1495), of Masovia (1495–1503)

- Duchy of Masovia (complete list) –

- Konrad III the Rudy, co-Duke of Warsaw (1454–1462), of Masovia (1462–1471), Duke of Czersk (1471–1495), of Warsaw (1488–1495), of Masovia (1495–1503)

- State of the Teutonic Order (complete list) –

- Konrad von Jungingen, Grand Master (1393–1407)
- Ulrich von Jungingen, Grand Master (1407–1410)
- Heinrich von Plauen, Grand Master (1410–1413)
- Michael Küchmeister von Sternberg, Grand Master (1414–1422)
- Paul von Rusdorf, Grand Master (1422–1441)
- Konrad von Erlichshausen, Grand Master (1441–1449)
- Ludwig von Erlichshausen, Grand Master (1450–1467)
- Heinrich Reuß von Plauen, Grand Master (1467–1470)
- Heinrich Reffle von Richtenberg, Grand Master (1470–1477)
- Martin Truchseß von Wetzhausen, Grand Master (1477–1489)
- Johann von Tiefen, Grand Master (1489–1497)
- Frederick, Duke of Saxony, Grand Master (1497–1510)

=== Europe: East ===
- Crimean Khanate (complete list) –

- Hacı I Giray, Khan (1441–1466)
- Nur Devlet, Khan (1466–1467)
- Meñli I Giray, Khan (1467)
- Nur Devlet, Khan (1467–1469)
- Meñli I Giray, Khan (1469–1475)
- Hayder, Khan (1475)
- Nur Devlet, Khan (1475–1476)
- Meñli I Giray, Khan (1478–1515)

- Khanate of Kazan (complete list) –

- Olugh Mokhammad, Khan (1438–1446)
- Mäxmüd, Khan (1445–1466)
- Xälil, Khan (1466–1467)
- Ibrahim, Khan (1467–1479)
- Ilham Ghali, Khan (1479–1484, 1485–1487)
- Möxämmädämin, Khan (1484–1485, 1487–1495, 1502–1518)
- Mamuq, Khan (1495–1496)
- Ghabdellatif, Khan (1496–1502)

- Moldavia (complete list) –

- Alexandru I the Good, Voivode (1400–1432)
- Iliaș I, Voivode (1432–1433, 1435–1443)
- Ștefan II, Voivode (1433–1435, 1435–1447)
- Petru III, Voivode (1444–1445, 1447, 1448)
- Roman II, Voivode (1447, 1447–1448)
- Csupor de Monoszló, usurper Prince (1448)
- Alexandru II, Voivode (1448–1449, 1452–1454, 1455)
- Bogdan II, Voivode (1449–1451)
- Petru IV Aron, Voivode (1451–1452, 1454–1454/55, 1455–1457)
- Ștefan III the Great, Voivode (1457–1504)

- Grand Duchy of Moscow (complete list) –

- Vasily I, Grand prince (1389–1425)
- Vasily II, Grand prince (1425–1434)
- Yury of Zvenigorod, Grand prince (1434)
- Vasily Kosoy, Grand prince (1434–1435)
- Vasily II, Grand prince (1435–1446)
- Dmitry Shemyaka, Grand prince (1446–1447)
- Vasily II, Grand prince (1447–1462)
- Ivan III the Great, Grand prince (1462–1505)

- Qasim Khanate (complete list) –

- Qasim ibn Ulugh Muhammad, Khan/ Sultan (1445–1468)
- Daniyal ibn Qasim, Sultan (1468–1486)
- Nur Devlet, Khan (1486–1491)
- Satylghan ibn Nur Daulat, Sultan (1491–1506)

- Principality of Theodoro/Gothia

- Stephen ( –1402)
- Alexios I (1402–1434)
- Alexios II (1434–1444)
- John (1444–1460)
- Isaac (1471–1474)
- Alexander (1474–1475)

- Principality of Wallachia (complete list) –

- Mihail I, Prince (1418–1420)
- Radu II the Bald, Prince (1420–1422, 1426–1427)
- Dan II, Prince (1422–1426, 1427–1431)
- Alexandru I Aldea, Prince (1431–1436)
- Vlad II the Dragon/Dracul, Prince (1436–1442, 1443–1447)
- Mircea II the Younger, Prince (1442, 1446–1447)
- Basarab II, Prince (1442–1443)
- Vladislav II, Prince (1447–1448, 1448–1456)
- Vlad III the Impaler, Prince (1448, 1456–1462, 1476)
- Radu III the Fair, Prince (1462–1473, 1473–1474, 1474, 1474–1475)
- Basarab III Laiotă the Old, Prince (1473, 1474, 1474, 1475–1476, 1476–1477)
- Basarab IV The Younger, The Little Impaler, Prince (1477–1481, 1481–1482)
- Mircea (III), Prince (1481)
- Vlad IV the Monk, Prince (1481, 1482–1495)
- Radu IV the Great, Prince (1495–1508)

=== Europe: Nordic ===
Kalmar Union

- Kalmar Union of Denmark, Sweden, and Norway (complete list, complete list, complete list) –

- Margaret I, Queen Regent of Denmark (1387–1412), of Norway (1388–1412), of Sweden (1389–1412)
- Eric of Pomerania, King (1389–1442)
- Sigurd Jonsson, Regent of Norway (1439–1442, 1448–1449)
- Christopher, King of Denmark (1440–1448), of Sweden (1441–1448), of Norway (1442–1448)
- Bengt Jönsson, Nils Jönsson, co-Regents of Sweden (1448)
- Charles VIII, King of Norway (1449–1450), of Sweden (1448–1457, 1464–1465, 1467–1470)
- Jöns Bengtsson, co-Regent of Sweden (1457), Regent (1465–1466)
- Erik Axelsson Tott, co-Regent of Sweden (1457), Regent (1466–1467)
- Christian I, King of Denmark (1448–1481), of Norway (1450–1481), of Sweden (1457–1464)
- Kettil Karlsson, Regent of Sweden (1464, 1464–1465)
- Sten Sture the Elder, Regent of Sweden (1470–1497, 1501–1503)
- Jon Svaleson Smør, Regent of Norway (1481–1483)
- John, King of Denmark (1481–1513), of Norway (1483–1513), of Sweden (1497–1501)

- Duchy of Schleswig (complete list) –

- Gerhard VI, Count of Holstein-Rendsburg, Duke (1386–1404)
- Henry IV, Count of Holstein-Rendsburg, Duke (1404–1427)
- Adolphus VIII, Count of Holstein, Duke (1440–1459)
- Christian I of Denmark, Duke (1460–1481)
- John, King of Denmark, Duke (1482–1513)
- Frederick I of Denmark, Duke (1490–1533)

=== Europe: Southcentral ===
States of Italy in 1494.

- Kingdom of Italy (Holy Roman Empire) (complete list) –

- Sigismund, King (1431–1437)
- Frederick III, King (1452–1493)

- Florence (complete list) –

- Cosimo the Elder, Lord (1434–1464)
- Piero the Gouty, Lord (1464–1469)
- Giuliano, Lord (1469–1478)
- Lorenzo the Magnificent, Lord (1469–1492)
- Piero the Unfortunate, Lord (1492–1494)
- Girolamo Savonarola, de facto ruler (1494–1498)

- Margraviate of Mantua (complete list) –

- Gianfrancesco Gonzaga, Lord (1407–1433), Marquess (1433–1444)
- Louis III, Marquess (1444–1478)
- Frederick I, Marquess (1478–1484)
- Francis II, Marquess (1484–1519)

- Margraviate of Massa and Carrara (complete list) –

- Antonio Malaspina, Marquis (1442–1445)
- Iacopo Malaspina, Marquis (1445–1481)
- Alberico II Malaspina, Marquis (1481–1519)

- Margraviate of Modena, Reggio, and Ferrara (complete list) –

- Niccolò III, Marquis of Ferrara and Modena (1393–1441), of Reggio (1405–1441)
- Leonello, Marquis (1441–1450)
- Borso, Marquis(1450–1452), Duke (1452–1471)

- Duchy of Modena, Reggio, and Ferrara (complete list) –

- Borso, Marquis(1450–1452), Duke (1452–1471)
- Ercole I, Duke (1471–1505)

- March of Montferrat (complete list) –

- Theodore II, Marquis (1381–1418)
- John Jacob, Marquis (1418–1445)
- John IV, Marquis (1445–1464)
- William VIII, Marquis (1464–1483)
- Boniface III, Marquis (1483–1494)
- William IX, Marquis (1494–1518)

- Papal States (complete list) –

- Boniface IX, Pope (1389–1404)
- Innocent VII, Pope (1404–1406)
- Gregory XII, Pope (1406–1415)
- Martin V, Pope (1417–1431)
- Eugene IV, Pope (1431–1447)
- Nicholas V, Pope (1447–1455)
- Callixtus III, Pope (1455–1458)
- Pius II, Pope (1458–1464)
- Paul II, Pope (1464–1471)
- Sixtus IV, Pope (1471–1484)
- Innocent VIII, Pope (1484–1492)
- Alexander VI, Pope (1492–1503)

- San Marino

- Captains Regent (1243–1500) –

- Ugolino di Giovanni, Betto di Guerolo, Captains Regent (1400–1401)
- Giovanni di Francesco, Bettino di Paolo, Captains Regent (1401)
- Bartolino di Antonio, Michelino di Paoluccio, Captains Regent (1401–1402)
- Gozio di Mucciolino, Landolino di Nicolino, Captains Regent (1402)
- Simone di Menghino, Rigone di Giovanni, Captains Regent (1402–1403)
- Vita di Corbello, Simone di Belluzzo, Captains Regent (1403)
- Martino di Guerolo de' Pistorj, Antonio Lunardini, Captains Regent (1403–1404)
- Paolino di Giovanni Bianco, Betto di Tura, Captains Regent (1404)
- Antonio di Tegna, Antonio di Marino di Fosco, Captains Regent (1404–1405)
- Giovanni di Guidino, Bettino di Paolo, Michele di Giovanni, Captains Regent (1405)
- Marino di Ghino, Foschino di Benedetto Madroni, Captains Regent (1405–1406)
- Giovanni di Francesco de' Pistorj, Giovanni di Nino de' Gherardi, Captains Regent (1406)
- Antonio Lunardini, Giovanni di Pasino, Captains Regent (1406–1407)
- Gozio di Mucciolino, Giovanni di Cecco di Alessandro, Captains Regent (1407)
- Paolino di Giovanni di Bianco, Michelino di Paoluccio, Captains Regent (1407–1408)
- Bartolino di Antonio, Michelino di Berardo, Captains Regent (1408)
- Simone di Menghino de' Calcigni, Benedetto di Tosetto, Captains Regent (1408–1409)
- Giovanni di Francesco, Giacomino di Paolo, Captains Regent (1409)
- Rigone di Giovanni, Antonio di Tegna, Captains Regent (1409–1410)
- Vita di Corbello, Bettino di Paolo, Captains Regent (1410)
- Michelino di Paoluccio, Sante Lunardini, Captains Regent (1410–1411)
- Simone di Belluzzo, Antonio di Marino di Fosco, Captains Regent (1411)
- Paolo di Carbone, Giovanni di Pasino Benvegnudi, Captains Regent (1411–1412)
- Simone di Menghino de' Calcigni, Foschino di Benedetto Madroni, Captains Regent (1412)
- Antonio di Segna, Giovanni di Ugolino di Giovanni, Captains Regent (1412–1413)
- Paolino di Giovanni di Bianco, Giovanni di Paolino Vitola, Captains Regent (1413)
- Francesco di Bartoccino, Michelino di Paoluccio, Captains Regent (1413–1414)
- Antonio Lunardini, Antonio di Marino di Fosco, Captains Regent (1414)
- Benedetto di Tosetto, Michelino di Berardo, Captains Regent (1414–1415)
- Bettino di Paolo, Silvestro di Cecco, Captains Regent (1415)
- Paolino di Giovanni di Bianco, Antonio di Simone Belluzzi, Captains Regent (1415–1416)
- Antonio Lunardini, Giovanni di Paolino Vitola, Captains Regent (1416)
- Michelino di Paoluccio, Giovanni di Pasino Benvegnudi, Captains Regent (1416–1417)
- Simone di Menghino Calcigni, Foschino di Benedetto Madroni, Captains Regent (1417)
- Giovanni di Ugolino di Giovanni, Cecco di Marino di Fosco, Captains Regent (1417–1418)
- Sante Lunardini, Bettino di Paolo, Captains Regent (1418)
- Antonio di Marino di Fosco, Antonio di Tegna, Captains Regent (1418–1419)
- Paolino di Giovanni di Bianco, Foschino di Benedetto Madroni, Captains Regent (1419)
- Giovanni di Paolino Vitola, Benedetto di Tosetto, Captains Regent (1419–1420)
- Antonio di Tegna, Cristofaro di Paolo Carboni, Captains Regent (1420)
- Antonio di Marino di Fosco, Antonio Giannini, Captains Regent (1420–1421)
- Antonio di Simone Belluzzi, Giovanni di Pasino Benvegnudi, Captains Regent (1421)
- Bettino di Paolo, Sante Lunardini, Captains Regent (1421–1422)
- Cristofaro di Paolo Carboni, Antonio Giannini, Captains Regent (1422)
- Francesco di Bartoccino, Antonio di Benedetto Tosetto, Captains Regent (1422–1423)
- Antonio Lunardini, Simone di Menghino Calcigni, Captains Regent (1423)
- Antonio di Marino Di Fosco, Giovanni di Paolino Vitola, Captains Regent (1423–1424)
- Antonio di Tegna, Antonio di Simone Belluzzi, Captains Regent (1424)
- Sante Lunardini, Baldassarre di Giovanni, Captains Regent (1424–1425)
- Giovanni di Paolino, Antonio di Rigo, Captains Regent (1425)
- Antonio di Marino di Fosco, Lorenzo di Piero, Captains Regent (1425–1426)
- Francesco di Bartoccino, Francesco di Simone Belluzzi, Captains Regent (1426)
- Sante Lunardini, Francesco di Betto, Captains Regent (1426–1427)
- Cristofaro di Paolo, Antonio di Benedetto, Captains Regent (1427)
- Giovanni di Pasino, Andrea di Cecco, Captains Regent (1427–1428)
- Antonio di Tegna, Antonio di Marino di Fosco, Captains Regent (1428)
- Sante Lunardini, Antonio Giannini, Captains Regent (1428–1429)
- Antonio di Rigo, Andrea di Cecco, Captains Regent (1429)
- Antonio di Simone Belluzzi, Giovanni di Pasino Benvegnudi, Captains Regent (1429–1430)
- Francesco di Simone Belluzzi, Giovanni di Antonio, Captains Regent (1430)
- Sante Lunardini, Benetino di Paolino, Captains Regent (1430–1431)
- Antonio di Simone Belluzzi, Antonio di Rigo, Captains Regent (1431)
- Giovanni di Antonio, Antonio di Bartolino, Captains Regent (1431–1432)
- Luigi di Vita, Baldassarre di Giovanni, Captains Regent (1432)
- Sante Lunardini, Tommaso di Antonio, Captains Regent (1432–1433)
- Antonio di Simone Belluzzi, Andrea di Cecco, Captains Regent (1433)
- Antonio di Benedetto, Barnaba di Antonio Lunardini, Captains Regent (1433–1434)
- Andrea di Michelino, Francesco di Betto, Captains Regent (1434)
- Benetino di Paolino, Luigi di Vita, Captains Regent (1434–1435)
- Giovanni di Antonio Lunardini, Ciono di Giovanni, Captains Regent (1435)
- Antonio di Simone Belluzzi, Antonio Giannini, Captains Regent (1436)
- Francesco di Simone Belluzzi, Michele di Giovanni, Captains Regent (1436–1437)
- Andrea di Cecco, Francesco di Bartolo, Captains Regent (1437)
- Francesco di Menghino, Giovanni di Antonio, Captains Regent (1437–1438)
- Niccolò di Michelino, Barnaba di Antonio Lunardini, Captains Regent (1438)
- Tommaso di Antonio, Antonio di Simone Belluzzi, Captains Regent (1438–1439)
- Luigi di Vita, Niccolò di Sabattino, Captains Regent (1439)
- Sante Lunardini, Bianco di Antonio, Captains Regent (1439–1440)
- Barnaba di Antonio Lunardini, Antonio Giannini, Captains Regent (1440)
- Antonio di Simone Belluzzi, Giacomo d'Antonio Sammaritani, Captains Regent (1440–1441)
- Filippo di Giovanni Caccia, Niccolò di Michelino, Captains Regent (1441)
- Marino Calcigni, Tommaso di Antonio, Captains Regent (1441–1442)
- Francesco di Simone Belluzzi, Cecco di Giovanni da Valle, Captains Regent (1442)
- Michele di Giovanni di Pasino, Bianco di Antonio, Captains Regent (1442–1443)
- Barnaba di Antonio Lunardini, Mengo di Antonio, Captains Regent (1443)
- Luigi di Vita, Menghino di Francesco Calcigni, Captains Regent (1443–1444)
- Francesco di Niccolò, Giacomo d'Antonio Sammaritani, Captains Regent (1444)
- Antonio di Simone Belluzzi, Cecco di Giovanni da Valle, Captains Regent (1444–1445)
- Niccolò di Michelino, Bartolo di Francesco, Captains Regent (1445)
- Cristofaro di Paolo, Antonio Giannini, Captains Regent (1445–1446)
- Giacomo d'Antonio Sammaritani, Bartolo di Angelo di Ciono, Captains Regent (1446)
- Bianco d'Antonio, Cecco di Giovanni da Valle, Captains Regent (1446–1447)
- Menghino di Francesco Calcigni, Marino di Fosco (died during his term,
  replaced by Vita di Giovanni di Paolino), Captains Regent (1447)
- Francesco di Niccolò, Filippo di Antonio Madroni, Captains Regent (1447–1448)
- Barnaba di Antonio Lunardini, Giacomo d'Antonio Sammaritani, Captains Regent (1448)
- Baldassarre di Giovanni, Cecco di Giovanni da Valle, Captains Regent (1448–1449)
- Bartolo di Angelo di Ciono, Venturuccio di Lorenzo, Captains Regent (1449)
- Bianco di Antonio, Simone di Antonio Belluzzi, Captains Regent (1449–1450)
- Francesco di Simone Belluzzi, Matteo di Mucciolo (died during his term,
  replaced by Marino di Venturino), Captains Regent (1450)
- Menghino di Francesco Calcigni, Mengo di Antonio, Captains Regent (1450–1451)
- Cecco di Giovanni da Valle, Simone di Antonio Belluzzi, Captains Regent (1451)
- Niccolò di Michelino, Paolo di Angelo di Ciono, Captains Regent (1451–1452)
- Giacomo d'Antonio Sammaritani, Andrea di Cecco, Captains Regent (1452)
- Cecco di Giovanni da Valle, Simone di Marino di Giovanni, Captains Regent (1452–1453)
- Simone di Antonio Belluzzi, Bartolo di Michele, Captains Regent (1453)
- Menghino di Francesco Calcigni, Filippo di Antonio Madroni, Captains Regent (1453–1454)
- Bartolo di Antonio Tegna, Girolamo di Francesco Belluzzi, Captains Regent (1454)
- Cecco di Giovanni da Valle, Francesco di Giuliano Righi, Captains Regent (1454–1455)
- Simone di Antonio Belluzzi, Andrea di Cecco, Captains Regent (1455)
- Giacomo d'Antonio Samaritani, Bartolo di Giovanni di Casalino, Captains Regent (1455–1456)
- Girolamo di Francesco Belluzzi, Riccio di Andrea, Captains Regent (1456)
- Niccolò di Michelino, Girolamo di Antonio, Captains Regent (1456–1457)
- Bianco di Antonio, Bartolo di Michele, Captains Regent (1457)
- Simone di Antonio Belluzzi, Marino di Venturino, Captains Regent (1457–1458)
- Girolamo di Francesco Belluzzi, Cecco di Giovanni da Valle, Captains Regent (1458)
- Menghino di Francesco Calcigni, Andrea di Cecco (died 1459 and
  replaced by Bartolo di Michele Pasini), Captains Regent (1458–1459)
- Bianco di Antonio, Bartolo di Antonio, Captains Regent (1459)
- Giacomo d'Antonio Sammaritani, Polinoro di Antonio Lunardino, Captains Regent (1459–1460)
- Marino di Venturino, Riccio di Andrea, Captains Regent (1460)
- Cecco di Giovanni da Valle, Simone di Marino di Giovanni, Captains Regent (1460–1461)
- Simone di Antonio Belluzzi, Francesco di Giovanni Sabattini, Captains Regent (1461)
- Menetto di Menetto Bonelli, Bianco di Antonio, Captains Regent (1461–1462)
- Bartolo di Antonio, Marino di Antonio Giannini, Captains Regent (1462)
- Giacomo di Antonio Sammaritani, Riccio di Andrea, Captains Regent (1462–1463)
- Girolamo di Francesco Belluzzi, Maurizio di Antonio, Captains Regent (1463)
- Cecco di Giovanni da Valle, Pasquino di Antonio, Captains Regent (1463–1464)
- Marino Venturini, Simone di Cecco di Benetto, Captains Regent (1464)
- Simone di Antonio Belluzzi, Giovanni Calcigni, Captains Regent (1464–1465)
- Bianco di Antonio, Paolo di Angelo di Ciono, Captains Regent (1465)
- Bartolo di Antonio, Simone di Baldo, Captains Regent (1465–1466)
- Pasquino di Antonio, Marino di Venturino, Captains Regent (1466)
- Girolamo di Francesco Belluzzi, Cecco di Giovanni da Valle, Captains Regent (1466–1467)
- Giacomo di Marino, Riccio di Andrea, Captains Regent (1467)
- Simone di Antonio Belluzzi, Maurizio di Antonio, Captains Regent (1467–1468)
- Marino di Venturino, Marino Giangi, Captains Regent (1468)
- Lodovico di Marino Calcigni, Cecco di Giovanni da Valle, Captains Regent (1468–1469)
- Bianco di Antonio, Simone di Marino di Giovanni, Captains Regent (1469)
- Bartolo di Antonio, Menetto di Menetto Bonelli, Captains Regent (1469–1470)
- Girolamo di Francesco Belluzzi, Paolo di Angelo di Ciono, Captains Regent (1470)
- Fabrizio di Pier Leone Corbelli, Riccio di Andrea, Captains Regent (1470–1471)
- Giacomo di Marino, Cecco di Giovanni da Valle, Captains Regent (1471)
- Giacomo d'Antonio Sammaritani, Marino di Venturino, Captains Regent (1471–1472)
- Maurizio di Antonio, Sabatino di Bianco, Captains Regent (1472)
- Girolamo di Francesco Belluzzi, Simone di Antonio Belluzzi, Captains Regent (1472–1473)
- Cecco di Giovanni da Valle, Serafino di Michele, Captains Regent (1473)
- Menetto di Menetto Bonelli, Sabatino di Bianco, Captains Regent (1473–1474)
- Bartolo di Antonio, Pasquino di Antonio, Captains Regent (1474)
- Serafino di Michele, Marino di Antonio Giannini, Captains Regent (1474–1475)
- Simone di Antonio Belluzzi, Simone di Cecco di Benetto, Captains Regent (1475)
- Antonio di Marino, Simone di Marino di Giovanni, Captains Regent (1475–1476)
- Bianco di Antonio, Giovanni di Menghino Calcigni, Captains Regent (1476)
- Bartolo di Antonio, Marino di Venturino, Captains Regent (1476–1477)
- Simone di Cecco Benetto, Marino di Antonio Giannini, Captains Regent (1477)
- Simone di Antonio Belluzzi, Lodovico di Michele Pasini, Captains Regent (1477–1478)
- Giovanni di Menghino Calcigni, Simone di Marino di Giovanni, Captains Regent (1478)
- Marino di Venturino, Sabatino di Bianco, Captains Regent (1478–1479)
- Antonio di Marino, Evangelista di Girolamo Belluzzi, Captains Regent (1479)
- Menetto di Menetto Bonelli, Fabrizio di Pier Leone Corbelli, Captains Regent (1479–1480)
- Riccio di Andrea, Marino Samaritani, Captains Regent (1480)
- Evangelista di Girolamo Belluzzi, Antonio di Polinoro Lunardini, Captains Regent (1480–1481)
- Marino di Venturino, Fabrizio di Pier Leone Corbelli, Captains Regent (1481)
- Bartolo di Antonio, Maurizio di Antonio Lunardini, Captains Regent (1481–1482)
- Simone di Antonio Belluzzi, Marino Sammaritani, Captains Regent (1482)
- Evangelista di Girolamo Belluzzi, Antonio di Polinoro Lunardini, Captains Regent (1482–1483)
- Antonio di Marino, Marino di Antonio Giannini, Captains Regent (1483)
- Giovanni di Menghino Calcigni, Antonio di Girolamo, Captains Regent (1483–1484)
- Riccio di Andrea di Antonio, Simone di Marino di Giovanni, Captains Regent (1484)
- Giacomo di Marino, Marino Giangi, Captains Regent (1484–1485)
- Maurizio di Antonio Lunardini, Bartolo di Pasquino, Captains Regent (1485)
- Sabatino di Bianco, Cristoforo di Cecco di Vita, Captains Regent (1485–1486)
- Menetto di Menetto Bonelli, Valente di Paolo, Captains Regent (1486)
- Antonio di Bianco, Marino Sammaritani, Captains Regent (1486–1487)
- Evangelista di Girolamo Belluzzi, Marino di Simone Muccioli, Captains Regent (1487)
- Simone di Antonio Belluzzi, Antonio di Polinoro Lunardini, Captains Regent (1487–1488)
- Bartolo di Antonio, Fabrizio di Pier Leone Corbelli, Captains Regent (1488)
- Simone di Antonio Belluzzi, Francesco di Antonio di Anastasio, Captains Regent (1488–1489)
- Giacomo di Marino, Antonio di Girolamo, Captains Regent (1489)
- Marino di Antonio Giannini, Gabriele di Bartolo, Captains Regent (1489–1490)
- Antonio di Maurizio Lunardini, Sabatino di Bianco, Captains Regent (1490)
- Giovanni di Menghino Calcigni, Marino Giangi, Captains Regent (1490–1491)
- Antonio di Bianco, Marino di Simone Muccioli, Captains Regent (1491)
- Menetto di Menetto Bonelli, Matteo Tura, Captains Regent (1491–1492)
- Riccio di Andrea, Fabrizio di Pier Leone Corbelli, Captains Regent (1492)
- Cristoforo di Cecco di Vita, Bonifazio di Andrea, Captains Regent (1492–1493)
- Evangelista di Girolamo Belluzzi, Valente di Paolo, Captains Regent (1493)
- Menetto di Menetto Bonelli, Francesco di Antonio di Anastasio, Captains Regent (1493–1494)
- Antonio di Girolamo, Marino di Simone Muccioli, Captains Regent (1494)
- Antonio di Maurizio Lunardini, Marino di Niccolò di Giovanetto, Captains Regent (1494–1495)
- Evangelista di Girolamo Belluzzi, Antonio di Polinoro Lunardini, Captains Regent (1495)
- Marino di Antonio Giannini, Antonio di Simone Belluzzi, Captains Regent (1495–1496)
- Fabrizio di Pier Leone Corbelli, Sabatino di Bianco, Captains Regent (1496)
- Cristofaro di Cecco di Vita, Bonifazio di Andrea, Captains Regent (1496–1497)
- Antonio di Bianco, Andrea di Giorgio Loli, Captains Regent (1497)
- Matteo Tura, Antonio di Bartolomeo, Captains Regent (1497–1498)
- Giovanni di Menghino Calcigni, Valente di Paolo, Captains Regent (1498)
- Antonio di Girolamo, Marino di Antonio Giannini, Captains Regent (1498–1499)
- Marino di Niccolò di Giovanetto, Antonio di Maurizio Lunardini, Captains Regent (1499)
- Cristoforo di Cecco di Vita, Bonifazio di Andrea, Captains Regent (1499–1500)
- Menetto di Menetto Bonelli, Antonio di Maurizio Lunardini, Captains Regent (1500)
- Francesco di Girolamo Belluzzi, Simone di Antonio Belluzzi, Captains Regent (1500–1501)

- Republic of Venice (complete list) –

- Michele Steno, Doge (1400–1413)
- Tommaso Mocenigo, Doge (1413–1423)
- Francesco Foscari, Doge (1423–1457)
- Pasquale Malipiero, Doge (1457–1462)
- Cristoforo Moro, Doge (1462–1471)
- Nicolò Tron, Doge (1471–1473)
- Nicolò Marcello, Doge (1473–1474)
- Pietro Mocenigo, Doge (1474–1476)
- Andrea Vendramin, Doge (1476–1478)
- Giovanni Mocenigo, Doge (1478–1485)
- Marco Barbarigo, Doge (1485–1486)
- Agostino Barbarigo, Doge (1486–1501)

Southern Italy

- Kingdom of Naples (complete list) –

- Ladislaus I the Magnanimous, King (1386–1389, 1399–1414)
- Louis III, King (1417–1426)
- Joanna II, Queen (1414–1435)
- René I the Good, King (1435–1442)
- Alfonso I the Magnanimous, King (1442–1458)
- Ferdinand I, King (1458–1494)
- Alfonso II, King (1494–1495)
- Ferdinand II, King (1495–1496)
- Frederick I, King (1496–1501)

- Kingdom of Trinacria: Sicily (complete list) –

- Maria, Queen (1377–1401)
- Martin I, King (1390–1409)
- Martin II, King (1409–1410)
- Ferdinand I, King (1412–1416)
- Alfonso the Magnanimous, King (1416–1458)
- John, King (1458–1468)
- Ferdinand II, King (1468–1516)

- Principality of Taranto (complete list) –

- Raimondo del Balzo Orsini, Prince (1393–1406)
- Ladislaus of Durazzo, Prince (1406–1414)
- James II of Bourbon-La Marche, Prince (1414–1420)
- Giovanni Antonio del Balzo Orsini, Prince (1420–1463)
- Isabella of Clermont, Princess (1463–1465)

=== Europe: Southwest ===
Iberian Peninsula: Christian

- Crown of Aragon (complete list) –

- Martin, King (1396–1410)
- Ferdinand I the Honest, King (1412–1416)
- Alfonso V the Magnanimous, King (1416–1458)
- John II the Great, King (1458–1479)

- Henry IV, claimant king (1462–1463)
- Peter V, claimant king (1463–1466)
- René, claimant king (1466–1472)

- Ferdinand the Catholic, King (1479–1516)

- Crown of Castile (complete list) –

- Henry III the Infirm, King (1390–1406)
- John II, King (1406–1454)
- Henry IV the Impotent, King (1454–1474)
- Isabella I the Catholic, Queen (1474–1504)
- Ferdinand the Catholic, King (1475–1504)

- Principality of Catalonia (complete list) –

- Martin the Humanist, Count (1396–1410)

- Kingdom of Navarre (complete list) –

- Charles III, King (1387–1425)
- Blanche I, Queen (1425–1441)
- John II, King (1425–1441 de jure; 1425–1479 de facto)
- Charles IV, King (1441–1461 de jure)
- Blanche II, Queen (1461–1464 de jure)
- Eleanor, King (1464–1479 de jure; 1479 de facto)
- Francis Phoebus, King (1479–1483)
- Catherine, Queen (1483–1517)

- County of Ribagorza (complete list) –

- Alfonso I, Count (1365–1412)
- Alfonso II, Count (1412–1422)
- Alfonso III, Count (1469–1485)
- John, Count (1485–1512)

- Kingdom of Portugal / Portugal and the Algarves (complete list) –

- John I, King (1385–1433)
- Edward I, King (1433–1438)
- Afonso V, King (1438–1477, 1477–1481)
- John II, King (1477–1477, 1481–1495)
- Manuel I, King (1495–1521)

Marca Hispanica

- Andorra

- Episcopal Co-Princes (complete list) –

- Galcerand de Vilanova, Episcopal Co-Prince (1387–1415)
- Francesc de Tovia, Episcopal Co-Prince (1415–1436)
- Arnau Roger de Pallars, Episcopal Co-Prince (1436–1461)
- Jaume de Cardona i Gandia, Episcopal Co-Prince (1461–1466)
- Roderic de Borja i Escrivà, Episcopal Co-Prince (1467–1472)
- Pedro Folc de Cardona / Pere de Cardona, Episcopal Co-Prince (1472–1512, 1513–1515)

- French Co-Princes (complete list) –

- Isabella, French Co-Princess (1398–1413)
- John I, French Co-Prince (1413–1436)
- Gaston IV, French Co-Prince (1436–1472)
- Francis Phoebus, French Co-Prince (1472–1483)
- Catherine, French Co-Princess (1483–1512, 1513–1517)

- County of Cerdanya (complete list) –

- Isabella, Count (1375–1403)

- County of Urgell (complete list) –

- Peter II of Urgell, Count (1347–1408)
- James II of Urgell, Count (1408–1413)

=== Europe: West ===
France

- Kingdom of France (complete list) –

- Charles VI, King (1380–1422)
- Henry VI of England, King, disputed (1422–1453)
- Charles VII, King (1422–1461)
- Louis XI, King (1461–1483)
- Charles VIII the Affable, King (1483–1498)
- Louis XII, King (1498–1515)

- Anjou (complete list) –

- Louis II, Duke (1377–1417)
- Louis III, Duke (1403–1434)
- René, Duke (1409–1480)
- Louise, Duke (1476–1531)

- Auvergne (complete list) –

- Joan II, Countess of Auvergne, Countess (1394–1422)
- John, Duke of Berry, Count (1394–1416)
- Georges de la Tremoille, Count (1416–1422)
- Marie I, Countess of Auvergne, Countess (1422–1437)
- Bertrand V of La Tour, Count (1437–1461)
- Bertrand VI of La Tour, Count (1461–1494)
- John III, Count of Auvergne, Count (1494–1501)

- County of Boulogne (complete list) –

- John III, Count (1386–1404)
- Joanna II, Countess (1404–1424)
- John IV, Count (1404–1416)
- George, Count (1416–1424)
- Mary II, Countess (1424–1437)
- Bertrand I, Count (1437–1461)
- Bertrand II, Count (1461–1497)
- John V, Count (1497–1501)

- Duchy of Brittany (complete list) –

- John V, Duke (1399–1442)
- Francis I, Duke (1442–1450)
- Peter II, Duke (1450–1457)
- Arthur III, Duke (1457–1458)
- Francis II, Duke (1458–1488)
- Anne, Duchess (1488–1514)

- Duchy of Burgundy (complete list) –

- Philip II the Bold, Duke (1363–1404)
- John the Fearless, Duke (1404–1419)
- Philip III the Good, Duke (1419–1467)
- Charles the Bold, Duke (1467–1477)
- Mary, Duchess (1477–1482)

- County of Maine (complete list) –

- Louis II, Count (1384–1417)
- Louis III, Count (1417–1434)
- René I of Naples, Count (1434–1441)
- Charles IV of Maine, Duke of Anjou, Count (1441–1472)
- Charles V of Maine, Duke of Anjou, Count (1480–1481)

- Monaco (complete list) –

- Louis, Lord (1395–1395, 1397–1402)
- Jean I, Lord (1395–1395, 1419–1454)
- Ambroise, Lord (1419–1427)
- Antonie, Lord (1419–1427)
- Catalan, Lord (1454–1457)
- Claudine, Lady (1457–1458)
- Lamberto, Lord (1458–1494)
- Jean II, Lord (1494–1505)

- County of Nevers (complete list) –

- John I, Count (1384–1404)
- Philip II, Count (1404–1415)
- Charles I, Count (1415–1464)
- John II, Count (1464–1491)
- Engelbert of Cleves, Count (1491–1506)

- County of Poitou (complete list) –

- John III, Count (1398–1417)
- Charles, Count (1403–1461)

Low Countries

- County of Artois (complete list) –

- Margaret II, Countess (1383–1405)
- John the Fearless, Count (1405–1419)
- Philip the Good, Count (1419–1467)
- Charles the Bold, Count (1467–1477)
- Philip I of Castile, Count (1482–1506)

For the succeeding rulers, see the County of Artois under the List of state leaders in the 16th-century Holy Roman Empire

- County of Flanders (complete list) –

- Margaret III, Countess (1384–1405)
- John the Fearless, Count (1405–1419)
- Philip III the Good, Count (1419–1467)
- Charles II the Bold, Count (1467–1477)
- Mary the Rich, Countess (1477–1482)
- Philip IV the Handsome, Count (1482–1506)

=== Eurasia: Caucasus ===
- Gazikumukh Khanate (complete list) –

- Surkhay I, Shamkhal (16th century)
- Umal-Muhammad I, Shamkhal (1551)
- Budai I ibn Umal-Muhammad, Shamkhal (1566–1567)
- Surkhay I ibn Umal-Muhammad, Shamkhal (1567–1569)
- Chopan ibn Budai, Shamkhal (1569–?)

- Kingdom of Georgia (complete list) –

- George VII, King (1393–1407)
- Constantine I, King (1407–1412)
- Alexander I, King (1412–1442)
- Vakhtang IV, King (1442–1446)
- George VIII, King (1446–1466)
- Bagrat VI, usurper King (1466–1478)
- Constantine II, King (1478–1505)

- Kingdom of Imereti (complete list) –

- Constantine II, King (1396–1401)
- Bagrat II, King (1463–1478)
- Alexander II, King (1484–1510)

- Kingdom of Kakheti (complete list) –

- George VIII, King (1466–1476)
- Alexander I, King (1476–1511)

- Kingdom of Kartli (complete list) –

- Constantine II, King (1478–1505)

== Oceania ==
Chile: Easter Island

- Easter Island (complete list) –

- Havini(vini) Koro (or Hariui Koro), King (c.1400)
- Puna Hako, King (?)
- Puna Ate Tuu, King (?)
- Puna Kai Te Vana, King (?)
- Te Riri Katea (?–1485), King (?)
- HAUMOANA, TARATAKI and TUPA ARIKI, King (c.1485–?)

Tonga

- Tuʻi Tonga Empire (complete list) –

- Havea II, King (?)
- Takalaua, King (?)
- Kauʻulufonua I, King (c.1470)
- Moʻungāmotuʻa, King (c.1470)
- Tanekingaʻotonga, King (?)
- Kau Vaka'uta, King (?)

United States: Hawaii

- Island of Hawaiʻi (complete list) –

- Kahoukapu, supreme high chief (1375–1405)
- Kauholanuimahu, supreme high chief (1405–1435)
- Kihanuilulumoku, supreme high chief (1435–1465)
- Līloa, supreme high chief (1465–1495)
- Hākau, supreme high chief (1495–1510)

== See also ==
- List of governors of dependent territories in the 15th century
- List of state leaders in the 15th-century Holy Roman Empire
- List of state leaders in 15th-century South Asia
