= List of rulers of the Jolof Empire =

The following is a list of rulers of the Jolof Empire. The Jolof Empire (French language – Diolof or Djolof) was a West African state that ruled parts of Senegal and The Gambia from 1360 to 1890.

The rulers were known as "Buur-ba Jolof". Their surnames were Njie (or Ndiaye).

== Rulers of the Jolof Empire ==
Names and dates taken from John Stewart's African States and Rulers (Third edition, 2006). Dates are approximative, and many are disputed by other historians.

=== Jolof Empire (1350–1549) ===
Name	Reign dates	Notes
N'Dyadya N'Dyaye	c. 1360 / c. 1350–1370	Also known as Ndiadiane Ndiaye (Seereer proper: Njaajaan Njaay). He is believed to have reigned after the Serer King of Sine, Maysa Wali Jaxateh Manneh, under whose instruction in both the Serer and Wolof oral tradition he was elected King of Jolof. Maysa Wali is generally accepted to have reigned from 1350-1370. His reign commence 15 years after his asylum in Serer country, after the dynastic struggle in his home country, Kaabu, in c. 1335. Fage and Oliver thus puts Ndiadiane's reign at c. 1360.
Sare N'Dyaye	c. 1370–1390	-
N'Diklam Sare	c. 1390–1420	-
Tyukuli N'Diklam	c. 1420–1440	-
Leeyti Tyukuli	c. 1440–1450	-
N'Dyelen Mbey Leeyti	c. 1450–1465	-
Birayma N'dyeme Eler	c. 1465–1481	-
Tase Daagulen	c. 1481–1488	-
Birayma Kuran Kan	c. 1488–1492	-
Bukaar Biye-Sungule	c. 1492–1527	-
Birayma Dyeme-Kumba	c. 1527–1543	-
Leele Fuli Fak	c. 1543–1549	Defeated and killed at the battle of Danki in 1549. Afterwards, the Jolof Empire collapsed and became a kingdom.

=== Jolof Kingdom (1549–1889) ===
Name	Reign dates
al-Buri Penda	c. 1549–1566
Lat-Samba	c. 1566–1597
Gireun Buri Dyelen	c. 1597–1605
Birayma Penda	c. 1605–1649
Birayma Mba	c. 1649–1670
Bakar Penda	c. 1670–1711
Bakan-Tam Gan	c. 1711–1721
al-Buri Dyakher	c. 1721–1740
Birayamb	c. 1740–1748
Birawa Keme	c. 1748–1750
Lat-Kodu	c. 1750–1755
Bakaa-Tam Buri-Nyabu	c. 1755–1763
Mba Kompaas	c. 1763–1800
Mba Buri-Nyabu	c. 1800–1818
Birayamb Kumba-Gey	c. 1818–1838
al-Buri Tam	c. 1838–1845
Baka Kodu	1845–1847
Birayamb Aram	1847–1849
Birayma-Penda	1849
Mbanyi-Paate	1849
Lat-Koddu	1849
Interregnum	1849–1850
Birayamb Ma-Dyigen	1850–1855
al-Buri Peya Birayma	1855–1856
Bakan-Tam Yaago	1856–1858
Taanor	1858–1863
Bakan-Tam Khaari	1863–1871
Amadou Seeku	1871–1875
Ali Buri N'Dyaye	1875–May 1890
Samba	3 June 1890–3 November 1895
Buuna	3 November 1895–1900

Jolof became part of the French Senegal Colony in 1889.

== See also ==
- History of The Gambia
- History of Senegal
- Jolof Empire
