= Portuguese expedition to Senegal (1487) =

- Part of Joloff Succession War
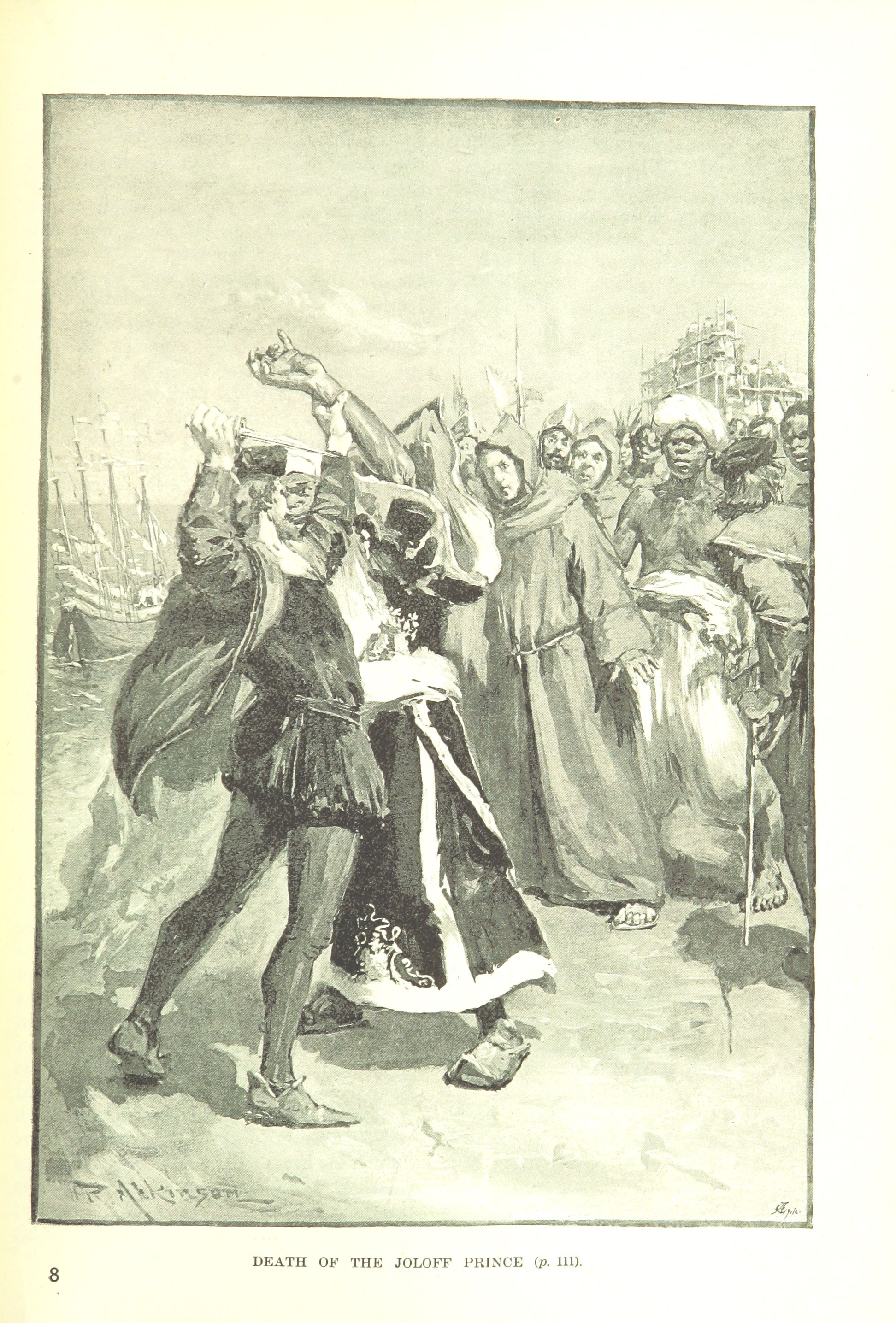
- "Death of the Joloff Prince", from 1892 book The Story of Africa and its Explorers
Date	1487
Location	Senegal River
Result	Inconclusive

Belligerents
Kingdom of Portugal; Jolof Empire (initially)	Jolof Empire

Commanders and leaders
Gonçalo Coelho; Bemoi (initially); Pero Vaz da Cunha	Sibetah; Bemoi X

Strength
20 ships	Unknown

The Portuguese expedition to Senegal (1487) was an expedition and attempt of Bemoi to regain the throne of Joloff from his brother, Sibetah.

== Background ==
An year after his succession, John II of Portugal gave orders for the completion of a fort at Arguin, which lay just to the south of Cape Blanco and had been begun by Afonso V of Portugal in 1455. With Arguin as a base the Portuguese tried to extend their influence in the countries to the south. Down south, a dispute over the throne of Joloff was occurring, which gave them the opportunity to try to gain a footing in the regions of the Senegal River. Gonçalo Coelho was sent to assist a claimant to the throne, Bemoi, whose claim to the throne was disputed by his brother Sibetah. Coelho made terms, where aid would be granted if Bemoi converted to Christianity.

== Expedition ==
Initially, Coelho withdrew support when Bemoi refused to convert to Christianity. However, Bemoi later traveled to Lisbon, where he converted, and was baptized as João. With a fleet of twenty ships under Pero Vaz da Cunha, Bemoi returned to Senegal to reclaim his throne. A fort was built at the mouth of the Senegal River, securing Portuguese presence. However, soon after, tensions arose between Bemoi and the Portuguese. Pedro Vaz da Cunha later had him murdered.

== Aftermath ==
After Bemoi's assassination, the Portuguese returned to their country. However, this expedition led to more communication with the rulers of the nearby territories. Embassies were sent to Timbuktu and to African chiefs in the interior.
