= Jelen (bumi) =

15th-century buumi of the Jolof Empire

Buumi Jeleen
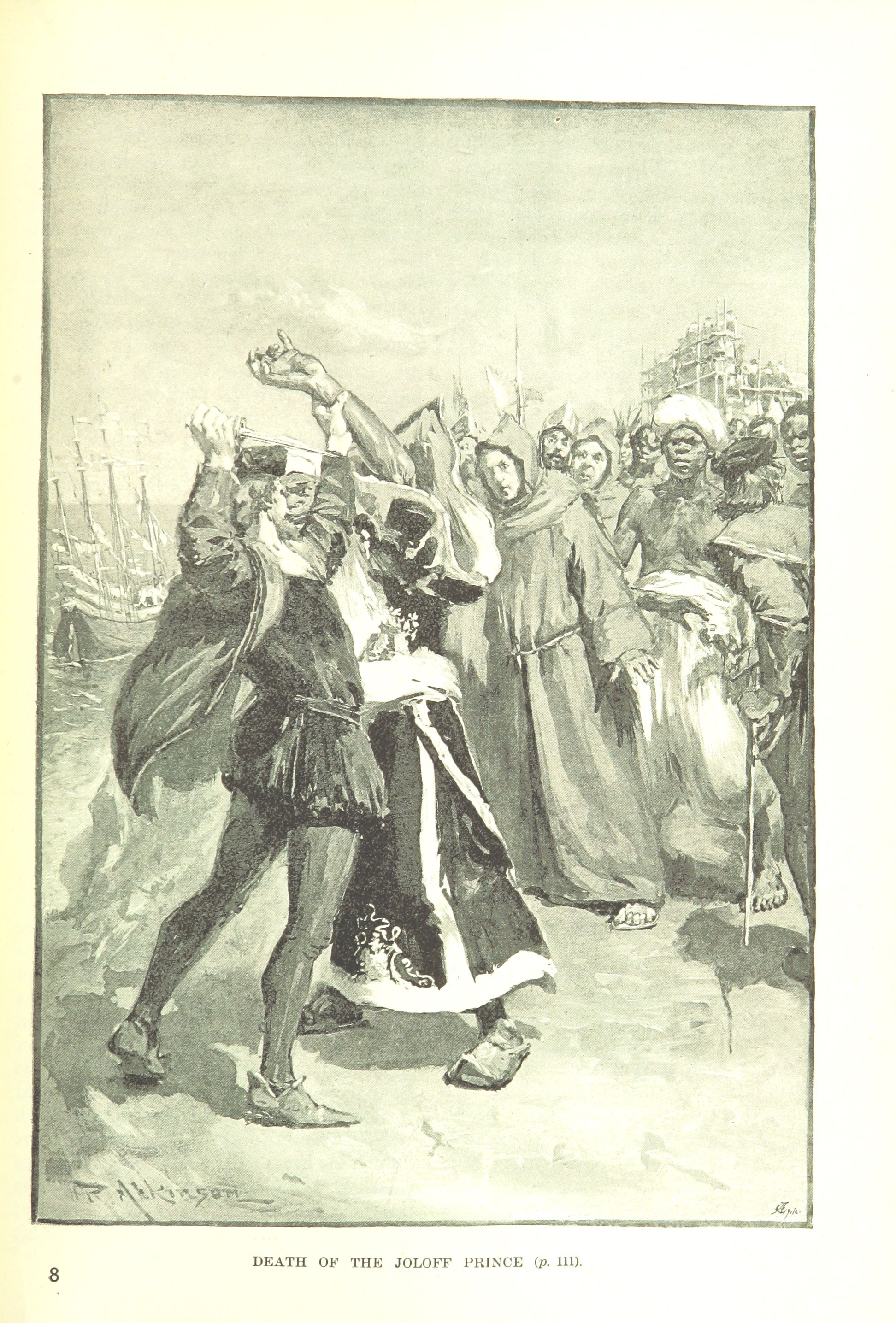
- "Death of the Joloff Prince", from 1892 book The Story of Africa and its Explorers

Buumi
- Monarch: Birayma Kuran Kan

Personal details
- Born: Jeleen Yatta Ntanye Ndiaye
- Died: 1489

Jeleen Yatta Ntanye, more commonly known as Jelen, Jeléen, or Bemoim, was a buumi of the Jolof Empire who attempted to take control of the state with help from the Portuguese in the late 15th century.

== Background ==
Jeleen was a member of the Ndiaye dynasty, the ruling family of the Jolof Empire. Oral sources do not all agree, but he was likely the son of the Buurba Tase Daagulen. Succession disputes were common at the time. The title of Buumi had been created in part to share power and attempt to reduce these conflicts.

== Rule as Buumi ==
Jeleen ruled over Waalo, near the mouth of the Senegal River. He played an important role in governing the empire, with the Buurba occupied with personal pleasures, and is credited in oral history as the first to establish a system of 'alkaldes' who served as customs agents. He moved his seat, or perhaps that of the whole empire, closer to the coast in order to better take advantage of the opportunities arising from the Portuguese trade that had begun a few decades earlier.

== Alliance with the Portuguese ==
Portuguese accounts of Jelen begin when merchants said he did not pay for items he had bought from them. Bemoim, a term coming from his title 'Bumi' in Wolof, received an envoy from Portugal sent to address the dispute. No money changed hands, but Jelen gave the Portuguese monarch 100 slaves.

In 1487, Jelen asked the Portuguese for help in a military campaign against his rivals, but this was denied. Jelen eventually had to withdraw to Arguin, a Portuguese colonial garrison. From there, he went to Portugal and had an audience with John II of Portugal, likely in September or October 1488. He was treated as a visiting European monarch would have been.

Jelen was baptized during the visit, on 3 November 1488, and given the baptismal name João. Peter Russell argues that John II had in fact been trying to get Jelen to convert for a while, perhaps because John was interested in spreading Christianity in the area known to the Portuguese as Guinea. They agreed that the Portuguese would send a force to Jolof to set up a fort and trading post at the mouth of the Senegal River and restore Jelen to power.

Jelen was murdered on the way back to West Africa by the Portuguese commander Pero Vaz da Cunha, who alleged Jelen had betrayed them.

== See also ==
- History of Senegal
- History of The Gambia

== Sources ==
- Bethencourt, Francisco (2011). "Creolization of the Atlantic World: The Portuguese and the Kongolese". Portuguese Studies. 27 (1): 56–69. doi:10.5699/portstudies.27.1.0056. ISSN 0267-5315. S2CID 162538290.
- Elbl, Ivana (1992). "Cross-Cultural Trade and Diplomacy: Portuguese Relations with West Africa, 1441–1521". Journal of World History. 3 (2): 165–204. ISSN 1045-6007. JSTOR 20078528.
- Fall, Rokhaya (2013). "De la nécessité de réactualiser le recours à la « tradition orale » dans l'écriture du passé africain". In Fauvelle-Aymar, François-Xavier; Hirsch, Bertrand (eds.). Les ruses de l'historien. Essais d'Afrique et d'ailleurs en hommage à Jean Boulègue. Hommes et sociétés (in French). Paris: Karthala. pp. 15–29. doi:10.3917/kart.fauve.2013.01.0015. ISBN 978-2-8111-0939-4.
- Lowe, Kate (2007). "'Representing' Africa: Ambassadors and Princes from Christian Africa to Renaissance Italy and Portugal, 1402–1608". Transactions of the Royal Historical Society. 17: 101–128. doi:10.1017/S0080440107000552. ISSN 0080-4401. S2CID 162682567.
- Ralph, Michael (2015). Forensics of Capital. University of Chicago Press. ISBN 978-0-226-19843-9. OCLC 898334267.
- Russell, Peter (8 September 2017). "White Kings on Black Kings: Rui de Pina and the Problem of Black African Sovereignty". In Pagden, Anthony (ed.). Facing Each Other: The World's Perception of Europe and Europe's Perception of the World. Vol. 2. Routledge. doi:10.4324/9781315255569. ISBN 978-1-315-25556-9.
