= Namandirou =

Former country in eastern Senegal

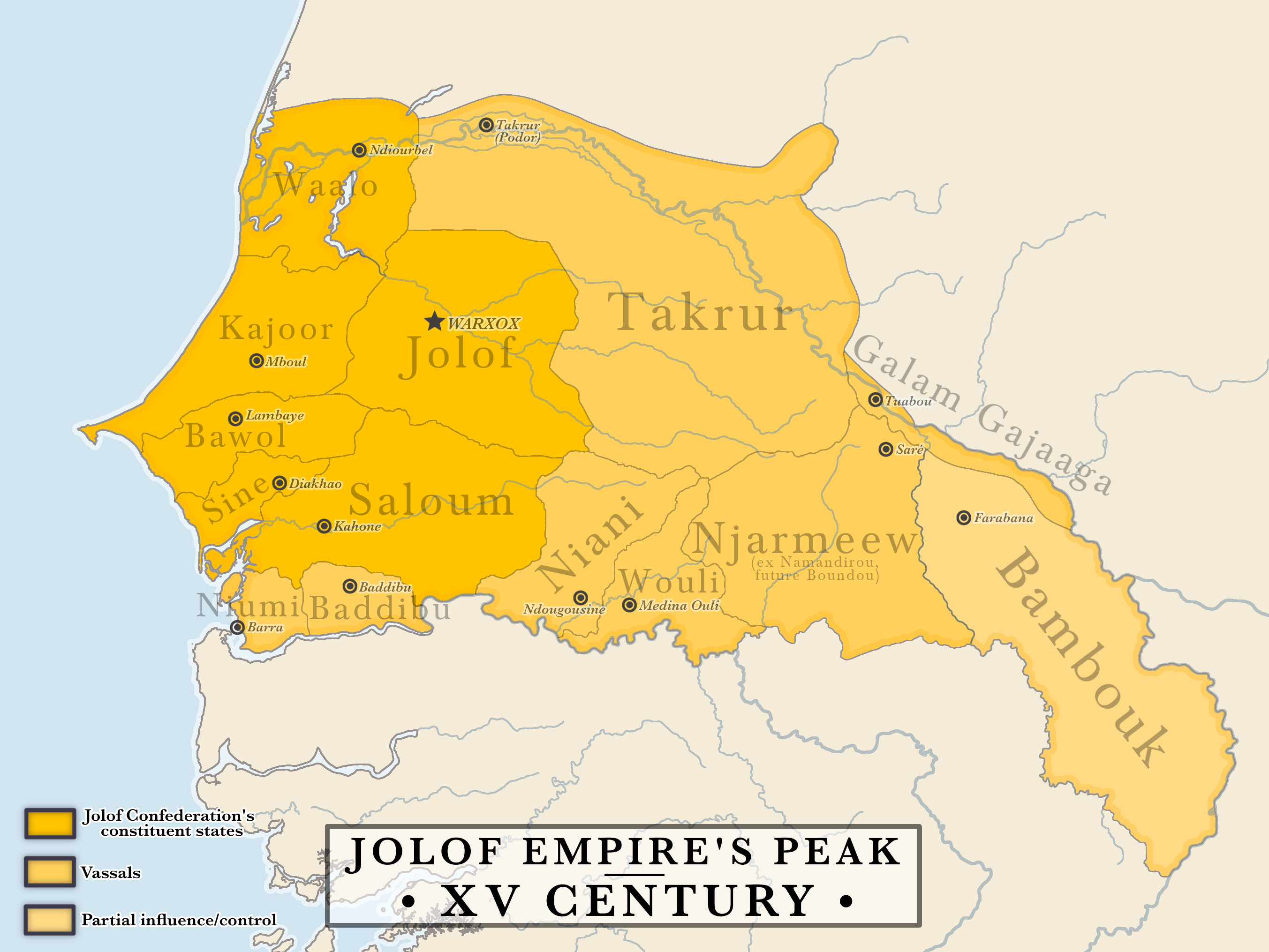
- Namandirou (Njarmeew), within the Jolof Empire
- Capital: Sare
- Religion: Traditional African religion, Islam
- Government: Monarchy
- Bëlëp
  - early 16th century: Wali Mberu Mbacke
- Today part of: Senegal

Namandirou (also spelled Nammandiru), also known as Njarmeew or Geremeo, was a kingdom in what is now eastern Senegal.

== Etymology ==
The name 'Namandirou' means 'country of abundance'. It is the more ancient name, while 'Njarmeew' or 'Geremeo' was the name commonly used in the 15-16th centuries.

== History ==
The early history of Namandirou is murky. Oumar Kane, citing oral histories, proposes that the Jaaogo dynasty of Takrur originated there, ruling until roughly 1000CE. After the conquest of Takrur by the Soninke Manna dynasty, Namandirou became their vassal, and was devastated by the Almoravids between 1072 and 1087. Rokhaya Fall argues that it was likely a part of the Kingdom of Wuli during a period when Wuli controlled the entire area between the Ferlo Desert and the Faleme River.

In the 13th century, Namandirou reappeared under the name Njarmeew, ruled by the Wolof Ndaw family who had originated north of the Senegal River.

In approximately 1460 (according to Portuguese writer Andre Donelha), Namandirou was invaded by the Jolof Buurba, Tyukuli N'Diklam, although some scholars argue that another Buurba, Birayma N'dyeme Eler, was responsible. After a long war, the Bëlëp (also Ber-lab, or king) of Namandirou was killed in a pitched battle, and the kingdom was conquered and given to a member of the royal family as a fief. Yoro Dyao records that, in the early 16th century, Koli Tengella defeated Ber-lab Wali Mberu Mbacke and drove the remaining population out, but he may be conflating Koli's attack on the eastern Jolof Empire with the destruction of the independent kingdom half a century earlier. This attack, among other things, helped weaken Jolof and set the stage for its disintegration at the Battle of Danki.

After the fall of Namandirou, the Ndaw family took refuge in Saloum, becoming a key ally of Mbegane Ndour and eventually taking over the leadership of Ndoucoumane.

== Sources ==
- Boulegue, Jean (2013). Les royaumes wolof dans l'espace sénégambien (XIIIe-XVIIIe siècle) (in French). Paris: Karthala Editions.
- Fall, Rokhaya (2013). "De la nécessité de réactualiser le recours à la « tradition orale » dans l'écriture du passé africain". In Fauvelle-Aymar, François-Xavier; Hirsch, Bertrand (eds.). Les ruses de l'historien. Essais d'Afrique et d'ailleurs en hommage à Jean Boulègue. Hommes et sociétés (in French). Paris: Karthala. pp. 15–29. doi:10.3917/kart.fauve.2013.01.0015. ISBN 978-2-8111-0939-4.
- Kane, Oumar (2004). La première hégémonie peule. Le Fuuta Tooro de Koli Teηella à Almaami Abdul. Paris: Karthala. ISBN 978-2-84586-521-1.
- Kane, Oumar (2021). "La Formation du Royaume Jaalalo du Kingi par Tenghella". In Fall, Mamadou; Fall, Rokhaya; Mane, Mamadou (eds.). Bipolarisation du Senegal du XVIe - XVIIe siecle (in French). Dakar: HGS Editions. pp. 42–92.
