= Umaru =

Umaru is a given name. Notable people with the name include:

- Umaru bin Ali (c. 1824 – 1891), Sultan of Sokoto
- Umaru Tanko Al-Makura (born 1952), Nigerian businessman elected Governor of Nasarawa State, Nigeria
- Umaru Argungu (born 1959), Senator for Kebbi North constituency of Kebbi State, Nigeria
- Umaru Bago Tafida, 12th Emir, or traditional ruler of Lapai in Niger State, Nigeria
- Umaru Bangura (born 1987), Sierra Leonean international footballer
- Umaru Dahiru (born 1952), elected Senator for the Sokoto South constituency of Sokoto State, Nigeria
- Umaru Dikko (born 1936), Nigerian politician and was a trusted adviser to President Shehu Shagari
- Umaru Mohammed, appointed Governor of North-Western State in Nigeria in July 1975
- Umaru Musa Yar'Adua (1951–2010), the President of Nigeria and the 13th Head of State
- Umaru Mutallab (born 1939), Nigerian business and banking leader, former minister of Economic Development
- Sylvester Umaru Onu (born 1938), Nigerian judge
- Umaru Pulavar, Tamil Muslim poet from Tamil Nadu, India
- Umaru Rahman (born 1982), Sierra Leonean international footballer who is a striker
- Umaru of Salga (1858–1934), left a detailed account of Quranic education among the Hausa
- Umaru Sanda Ndayako (1937–2003), 12th Etsu Nupe. Nigerian Traditional ruler
- Dalhatu Umaru Sangari, elected Senator for the Taraba South constituency of Taraba State, Nigeria
- Sitta Umaru Turay (born 1978), Sierra Leonean journalist on the Freetown-based Sierra Express newspaper
- Mohammed Ndatsu Umaru, Military Governor of Kwara State, Nigeria from August 1985 to December 1987
- Umaru Doma, the protagonist of Himouto! Umaru-chan, a Japanese manga series by Sankaku Head

== See also ==
- Umaru Musa Yar'adua University
