= Sare Ndiadiane =

- Burba Jolof
- Reign: c.1303–c.1323
- Predecessor: Ndiadiane Ndiaye
- Successor: N'Diklam Sare
- Mother: Marema Ndoye Gueye

Sare Ndiadiane (ruled c.1370–c.1390), also known as Sare N'Dyaye, was the second ruler, or Burba, of the Jolof Empire. He was the son of Ndiadiane Ndiaye, the founder of the empire, and Marema Ndoye Gueye of the Begedji lineage, born after his father left Waalo for Djolof.

| Preceded by Ndiadiane Ndiaye | Burba Jolof; Jolof Empire c.1370-c.1390 | Succeeded by N'Diklam Sare |
