= Ndiadiane Ndiaye =

Semi-legendary founder of the Jolof Empire

- Buurba Jolof
- Reign: c. 1360
- Predecessor: Lamanes
- Successor: Sare Ndiaye
- Born: Futa Toro
- Consort: Oula, Marema Ndoye Gueye
- Issue: Goor Ndiadiane, Sare Ndiadiane, Nget Ndiadiane
- House: Ndiaye dynasty
- Mother: Fatoumata Sall
- Religion: Serer religion

Ndiadiane Ndiaye, frequently spelled Njaajan Njaay or Njai in English, is the legendary founder of the Jolof Empire. The story of Ndiadiaye Ndiaye is recorded in the oral histories of the Wolof and Serer peoples. Although the exact dates of his reign are unknown, he founded the Ndiaye dynasty that ruled Jolof until the 19th century. His epic says he grew up In what is now the Bakel Department of Senegal, as the son of Fatoumata Sall, the daughter of a local chief. His father is variously named Abu Darday, Bubakar Omar and Boukar Ndiaye. According to the legend, when his mother remarried following her husband's death, Ndiadiane left his home and travelled, via the Senegal River, to Waalo, where his ability to make good judgements led to the people appointing him their leader. After ruling the Waalo for 16 years, he founded the Jolof Empire by peaceful means. On his death, the empire passed to his son, Sare Ndiadiane. He is called the ancestor of the peoples of Senegal and the term Ndiadiane Ndiaye is used as a colloquial term for the country.

== Historicity ==
Like many founders of nations, there is no evidence of the existence of Ndiadiane Ndiaye in any written archive. His story is recorded in the oral histories of Wolof and Serer peoples as the founder of the Jolof Empire. The legend highlights Ndiaye's role as the unifier of previously divided people and the creator of relatively democratic governance institutions. Fearing writes that "most versions of the myth explain how the new dynasty superimposed itself upon a preexisting social structure dominated by the Laman, Wolof elders who claimed 'ownership' of the land as the descendants of the founders of village communities." There is evidence that the laman retained many of their functions under the new monarchical order, becoming in effect a lesser nobility within the new state, and serving as electors when the time came to choose a new king from the Njaay dynasty.

Scholars disagree on the dates of Ndiadiane Ndiaye's reign. Dates in the early thirteenth century are often ascribed to him, but John Donnelly Fage claimed that a more likely scenario is that the rise of the empire was associated with the growth of Wolof power at the expense of the ancient Sudanese state of Takrur, which was essentially a development that took place in the fourteenth-century. The kings lists of Waalo and Jolof also point to a date in the second half of the fourteenth century. Historian Jean Boulegue adjusted these same lists using early written sources to estimate a date around 1300. The Rao archaeological site, near the ancient village of Mboyu-Gar where Ndiaye first appeared in Waalo, dates to the period between 1300 and 1350, and could be linked to the foundation of Jolof.

== Legend ==
The epic of Ndiadiane Ndiaye begins with the story of his father, Bubakar Omar, and his Mandinka slave, Mbarik Bo, and their adventure as they travel from the Levant to the Senegal River. Once at his destination, Bubakar Omar marries Fatumata Sall, the daughter of the Waalo chief, Abraham Sall. Born in Futa Toro, Ndiaye is their son, who grows up in what is now the Bakel Department of Senegal. His father is mortally injured in a fight with a rival king named Hamar. After his father dies, Ndiadiane avenges the death by killing Hamar, but his mother marries Mbarik Bo. Ashamed and hurt by the match, Ndiaye responds by jumping into the Senegal River and beginning to live an aquatic life. Endowed with superhuman qualities, he makes his way downstream to the area that would become the Kingdom of Waalo, living in the river or on an island.

At this time, Waalo was divided into villages ruled by separate kings using the Serer title Lamane, some of whom were engaged in a dispute over a wood near a prominent lake. This almost led to bloodshed among the rulers but was stopped by the mysterious appearance of a stranger from the lake. The stranger divided the wood fairly and disappeared, leaving the people in awe. Other versions have Ndiaye emerging from the water to fairly divide a disputed catch of fish. In both versions, the people then feigned a second dispute and kidnapped the stranger when he returned. Ndiaye initially refused to speak, but was eventually coaxed out of silence by a woman, Bate Boye. When these events were reported to the ruler of the Sine, Maad a Sinig Maysa Wali, he is reported to have exclaimed "lahi ndiadiane!" in his native Serer language in amazement.

A great magician, Maysa Wali foresaw the Ndiaye family's great future, and advised the people to take him as their first king, which they did. In some versions, all the rulers between the Senegal and Gambia Rivers voluntarily submitted to him. Ndiaye ruled wisely for 16 years over Waalo when his half brother, Barka Bo or Mbodj, who had heard of his success, came to join him. Ndiaye rejected his relation as a son of a slave, and so left for Jolof. His fame preceded him, and so he was welcomed there, founding the Jolof Empire when the rulers of the region voluntarily submitted to him. His empire consisted of a number of semi-autonomous states, each with their own ruler, as the existence of king lists from Cayor and Baol after his ascension attest. He was known as a peacemaker rather than as a conqueror who obtained his kingdom by force.

== Family ==
Ndiaye's ancestry varies across the different versions of the legend. The consensus is that his mother was an African woman named Fatoumata Sall, who married an unknown man of possible noble blood. Sallah writes: "Some say that Njajan was the son of Abu Darday, an Almoravid conqueror who came from Mecca to preach Islam in Senegal ... Some say that Ndiadiane Ndiaye was a mysterious person of Fulani origin. Others say he was a Serer prince." Some oral histories equate Abu Darday with Abu Bakr ibn Umar, but he died over two-hundred and sixty years before Ndiaye ruled, and Ndiaye is never mentioned in Arabic sources. Abdourahmane Ba has advanced the claim that, Ndiaye may be a descendant of Abu Bakr, and his father was the 6th Almoravid emir to rule the Berbers on the southern edge of the Sahara. Sereer traditions maintain that Ndiadiane Ndiaye's father was Lamane Boukar Ndiaye, a Serer from Waalo, and his mother Fatoumata Sall was the daughter of the Lamtoro Ambraham Sall of Takrur. The name 'Abu Bakr' would have arisen as a corruption of the Serer name 'Boukar'.

According to the legend, Ndiaye had sons from multiple wives who became the rulers of kingdoms. When he settled in Ndiayene Sagour, he married a Fula woman called Oula. They had a son named Goor Ndiadiane, from whom the Fulani nobility of Jolof were descended. His second wife was named Marema Ndoye Gueye. They had two children, Sare Ndiadiane, who succeeded him, and Nget Ndiadiane, the ancestor of the Diop of Cayor, Sine, Saloum and Waalo.

== Legacy ==
Ndiadiane Ndiaye is seen as the founder of what is the nation of Senegal today, the ancestor of most of the Senegalese peoples and remains an important folk hero in the country today. His name is used as a colloquial term to refer to all of Senegal. An important part of the coronation ceremonies in Waalo and Jolof was the royal bath, known as xulixuli taken as Ndaseew, where Ndiaye first emerged from the river.

Wolof oral traditions hold that the Wolof language was created at Ndiaye's court by mixing the diverse languages of the empire including Fula, Serer and Mandinka. The Wolof people originated in part from the mixing of Serer, Toucouleur and other peoples, and so contemporary ethnic and linguistic labels may have had very different meanings, or no meaning at all, in Ndiaye's time. This is reflected in the epic by Ndiaye's origins. According to James Searing, "in all versions of the myth, Njaajaan Njaay speaks his first words in Pulaar rather than Wolof, emphasizing once again his character as a stranger of noble origins."

== Bibliography ==
- Bomba, Victoria (1977). "Traditions About Ndiadiane Ndiaye, First Buurba Djolof". Bulletin de l'Institut Fondamental d'Afrique Noire. 39B: 1–33.
- Boulègue, Jean (1987). Le Grand Jolof, XIIIe-XVIe siècle [The Great Jolof, 13th-16th century] (in French). Blois: Façades. ISBN 978-2-90723-300-2.
- Boulègue, Jean (2013). Les royaumes wolof dans l'espace sénégambien (XIIIe-XVIIIe siècle) [The Wolof kingdoms in the Senegambian region (13th-18th century)] (in French). Paris: Karthala Editions. ISBN 978-2-81110-880-9.
- Brooks, George E. (August 1985). Western Africa to c1860 A.D. A provisional historical schema based on climate periods (PDF) (Report). Bloomington, Indiana: African Studies Program Indiana University.
- Charles, Eunice A. (1977). Precolonial Senegal: the Jolof Kingdom, 1800-1890. Boston: African Studies Center, Boston University. OCLC 245867245.
- Dieng, Bassirou; Kesteloot, Lilyan (2009). "Le mythe de Ndiadiane Ndiaye". Les épopées d'Afrique noire [The epics of black Africa: The myth of Ndiadiane Ndiaye] (in French). Paris: Karthala. pp. 252–256. ISBN 978-2-81110-210-4.
- Diop, Samba (2006). "The Wolof Epic: From Spoken Word to Written Text". Research in African Literatures. 37 (3): 120–32. doi:10.2979/RAL.2006.37.3.120. JSTOR 3821183.
- Diouf, Babacar Sedikh (1987). O maad a sinig: Kumba Ndoofeen fa Maak JUUF (Buka-Cilaas), 1853-1871 [King of Sine Kumba Ndofeen fa Maak Juuf (also known as "Buka-Chilaas"), reigned: 1853–1871] (in Serer). Dakar: PAPF. OCLC 54639013.
- Fage, J. D.; Oliver, Roland, eds. (1975). The Cambridge History of Africa. Cambridge: Cambridge University Press. ISBN 978-0-52120-981-6.
- Gamble, David P.; Salmon, Linda K.; Njie, Alhaji Hassan (1985). Peoples of the Gambia: The Wolof. I. San Francisco: San Francisco State University, Department of Anthropology. OCLC 16815490.
- Haskins, James; Biondi, Joann (1995). From Afar to Zulu: a dictionary of African cultures. New York: Walker. ISBN 978-0-80278-291-5.
- Johnson, Wesley (1971). The emergence of Black politics in Senegal: the struggle for power in the four communes, 1900-1920. California: Stanford University Press. ISBN 978-0-80470-783-1.
- Kesteloot, Lilyan; Hale, Thomas A.; Bjornson, Richard (1997). "Power and Its Portrayals in Royal Mandé Narratives". Research in African Literatures. 22 (1): 17–26. JSTOR 3819603.
- Mc Laughlin, Fiona; Mufwene, Salikoko S. (2008). "The Ascent of Wolof as an Urban Vernacular and National Lingua Franca in Senegal". In Vigouroux, Cécile B.; Mufwene, Salikoko S. (eds.). Globalization and Language Vitality: Perspectives from Africa. Continuum. pp. 142–170. ISBN 978-0-82649-515-0. Archived from the original on 17 December 2011.
- Ndiaye, Bara (2021). "Le Jolof: Naissance et Evolution d'un Empire jusqu'a la fin du XVIIe siecle" [The Jolof: Birth and Evolution of an Empire until the end of the 17th century]. In Fall, Mamadou; Fall, Rokhaya; Mane, Mamadou (eds.). Bipolarisation du Senegal du XVIe - XVIIe siecle [Bipolarization of Senegal from the 16th - 17th century] (in French). Dakar: HGS Editions. pp. 166–236.
- Riley, Emily (2019). ""Guests of God": The Layene, an Urban Sufi Community of Dakar, Senegal". Africa Today. 66 (1): 116–140. doi:10.2979/africatoday.66.1.06.
- Sallah, Tijan M. (1995). Wolof: (Senegal). New York: Rosen. ISBN 978-0-82391-987-1.
- Searing, James (2003). West African Slavery and Atlantic Commerce: The Senegal River Valley, 1700–1860. Cambridge: Cambridge University Press. ISBN 9780521534529.
- Stride, G. T.; Ifeka, Caroline (1971). Peoples and Empires of West Africa: West Africa in History 1000–1800. Walton-on-Thames: Nelson. pp. 21–26. ISBN 978-0-17511-448-1.
- Taal, Ebou Momar (22 April 2010). "Senegambian Ethnic Groups: Common Origins and Cultural Affinities Factors and Forces of National Unity, Peace and Stability". Gambia News.
- Fage, J. D.; Oliver, Roland; "The Cambridge History of Africa." Volume 3. Cambridge University Press, 1975, p. 486, ISBN 0521209811 & ISBN 9780521209816

Preceded by None	Burba Jolof; Jolof Empire c. 1360-1370	Succeeded by Sare Ndiadiane
