= Birayma Dyeme-Kumba =

- Burba Jolof
- Reign: c.1527–c.1543
- Predecessor: Bukaar Biye-Sungule
- Successor: Leele Fuli Fak

Birayma Dyeme-Kumba (ruled c.1527–c.1543) was the eleventh ruler, or Burba, of the Jolof Empire.

Preceded by Bukaar Biye-Sungule	Burba Jolof; Jolof Empire c.1527–c.1543	Succeeded by Leele Fuli Fak
