= N'Dyelen Mbey Leeyti =

- Burba Jolof
- Reign: c.1450–c.1465
- Predecessor: Leeyti Tyukuli
- Successor: Birayma N'dyeme Eler
- Issue: Birayma Kuran Kan

N'Dyelen Mbey Leeyti (ruled c.1450–c.1465) was the sixth ruler, or Burba, of the Jolof Empire. He, like his next two successors, was a member of the Jonai maternal lineage.

| Preceded by Leeyti Tyukuli | Burba Jolof; Jolof Empire c.1450-c.1465 | Succeeded by Birayma N'dyeme Eler |
