= Leele Fuli Fak =

- Burba Jolof
- Reign: c.1543–c.1549
- Predecessor: Birayma Dyeme-Kumba
- Successor: al-Buri Penda
- Religion: Islam

Leele Fuli Fak or Leele Fuli Fak Njie (ruled c.1543–c.1549) was the twelfth ruler, or Burba, of the Jolof Empire, in modern-day Senegal. He was the last emperor. After his defeat at the Battle of Danki in 1549, the empire collapsed and Jolof became a mere kingdom. Leele Fuli was killed in that battle.

Preceded by Birayma Dyeme-Kumba	Burba Jolof; Jolof Empire c.1543–c.1549	Succeeded by al-Buri Penda
