= N'Diklam Sare =

- Burba Jolof
- Reign: c.1390–c.1420
- Predecessor: Sare Ndiadiane
- Successor: Tyukuli N'Diklam

N'Diklam Sare (ruled c.1390–c.1420) was the third ruler, or Burba, of the Jolof Empire.

Preceded by Sare Ndiadiane	Burba Jolof; Jolof Empire c.1390-c.1420	Succeeded by Tyukuli N'Diklam
