= Leeyti Tyukuli =

- Burba Jolof
- Reign: c.1440 – c.1450
- Predecessor: Tyukuli N'Diklam
- Successor: N'Dyelen Mbey Leeyti

Leeyti Tyukuli (ruled c.1440 – c.1450) was the fifth ruler, or Burba, of the Jolof Empire.

Preceded by Tyukuli N'Diklam	Burba Jolof; Jolof Empire c.1440 – c.1450	Succeeded by N'Dyelen Mbey Leeyti
