= Bukaar Biye-Sungule =

- Burba Jolof
- Reign: c.1492–c.1527
- Predecessor: Birayma Kuran Kan
- Successor: Birayma Dyeme-Kumba

Bukaar Biye-Sungule (ruled c.1492–c.1527) was the tenth ruler, or Burba, of the Jolof Empire.

Preceded by Birayma Kuran Kan	Burba Jolof; Jolof Empire c.1492–c.1527	Succeeded by Birayma Dyeme-Kumba
