= Umaru of Salga =

Imam Umaru of Salga (1858–1934) left a detailed account of Quranic education among the Hausa.
