= Birayma Kuran Kan =

- Burba Jolof
- Reign: c.1488–c.1492
- Predecessor: Tase Daagulen
- Successor: Bukaar Biye-Sungule
- Father: Jeleen Mbay Leyti

Birayma Kuran Kan, also spelled Biram Kura Kan (ruled c.1488–c.1492) was the ninth ruler, or Burba, of the Jolof Empire. He was the son of Jeleen Mbay Leyti and nephew of Biram Njeme Eler, both earlier Burbas, and like them was a member of the Baol-Baol Jonaï maternal lineage.

Birayma Kuran Kan served as governor of Porto d'Ale, an important center of European trade, under his predecessor Tase Daagulen, where he became wealthy and built strong connections with the merchants. When the Burba ordered him to return to court, he threw a feast as a kind of retirement party, at which Tase Daagulen was poisoned.

| Preceded by Tase Daagulen | Burba Jolof; Jolof Empire c.1488-c.1492 | Succeeded by Bukaar Biye-Sungule |
