= Tyukuli N'Diklan =

- Burba Jolof
- Reign: c.1420–c.1440
- Predecessor: N'Diklam Sare
- Successor: Leeyti Tyukuli
- Born: 1433 (disputed)

Tyukuli N'Diklan, also spelled Cukuli Njiklaan, was the fourth ruler, or Burba, of the Jolof Empire. His rule saw the apogee of the empire's power, when it unified much of Senegambia.

== Reign ==
Stewart places his rule between c.1420 and c.1440. Senegalese scholar Oumar Kane, however, proposes that he was born in 1433 and identifies him as the 'Zucholin' who appears in Alvise Cadamosto's account of his visit to Senegambia. This timeline would place him on the throne as late at 1460, when he conquered Takrur and Namandirou and attacked the Kingdom of Sine. This identification is disputed, however, with Rokhaya Fall and Jean Boulegue believing that Birayma N'dyeme Eler was responsible for these attacks.

Preceded by N'Diklam Sare	Burba Jolof; Jolof Empire c.1420-c.1440	Succeeded by Leeyti Tyukuli
