= Tase Daagulen =

- Burba Jolof
- Reign: c.1481–c.1488
- Predecessor: Birayma N'dyeme Eler
- Successor: Birayma Kuran Kan

Tase Daagulen (ruled c. 1481–c. 1488) was the eighth ruler, or Burba, of the Jolof Empire.

Preceded by Birayma N'dyeme Eler	Burba Jolof; Jolof Empire c. 1481–c. 1488	Succeeded by Birayma Kuran Kan
