= Birayma N'dyeme Eler =

- Burba Jolof
- Reign: c.1465–c.1481
- Predecessor: N'Dyelen Mbey Leeyti
- Successor: Tase Daagulen

Birayma N'dyeme Eler, also spelled Biram Njeme Eler (ruled c.1465–c.1481) was the seventh ruler, or Burba, of the Jolof Empire. He was a member of the Jonaï maternal lineage, which originated in Baol.

== Reign ==
Information about Biram Njeme Eler, coming mostly from oral histories, is debated by scholars. Rokhaya Fall, relying on Senegambian oral histories as well as 15th century Portuguese sources, credits him with founding a new capital for the empire at Ceng as well as conquering Namandirou, Saloum, and the Mandinka kingdoms of the north bank of the Gambia River in the middle of the century. Oumar Kane, however, assigns responsibility for much of these deeds to a precursor, Cukli Njiklaan.

Eler was succeeded by his nephew, Tasé Daaguleen, after Tasé had defeated his son Bukar Bige in a power struggle.

Preceded by N'Dyelen Mbey Leeyti	Burba Jolof; Jolof Empire c.1465-c.1481	Succeeded by Tase Daagulen
