= Jolof Empire =

West African state (1350–1549)

Jolof Empire امبراطورية جولوف
- c. 1360–1549
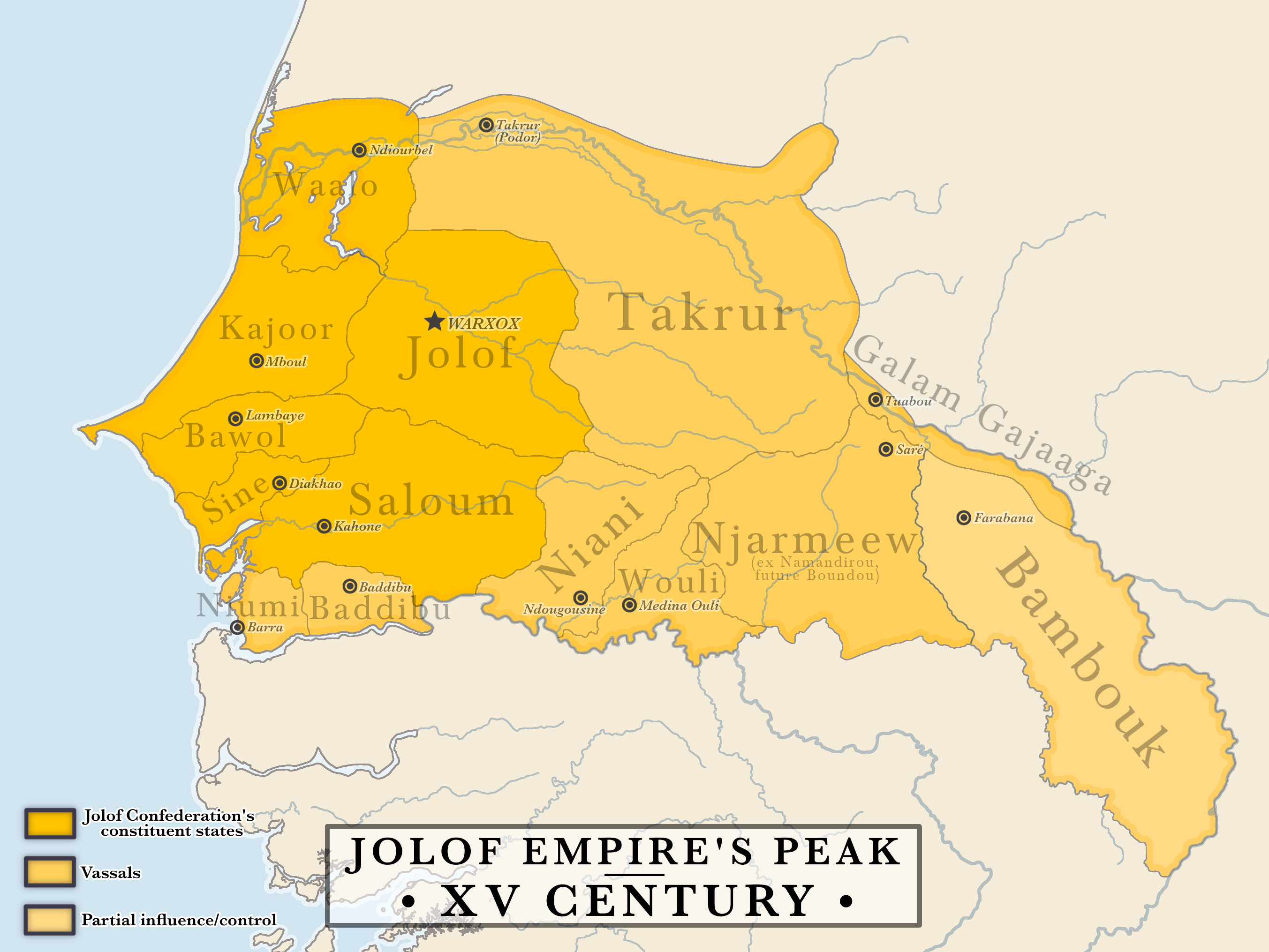
- Map of the Jolof Empire's borders, including tributary states and territories of influence.
- Capital: Ouarkhokh
- Common languages: Wolof, Serer, Pulaar
- Religion: Traditional African religion (Serer religion), Islam (towards the end of Kingdom of Jolof)
- Government: Monarchy
- Emperor (Buur-ba Jolof)
  - 1360: Ndiadiane Ndiaye
  - 1543–1549: Leele Fuli Fak
- History
  - Established: c. 1360
  - Battle of Danki and empire reduced to a rump kingdom: 1549
- Currency: iron, cloth
Preceded by
Mali Empire
Takrur
Kingdom of Sine
Succeeded by
Kingdom of Jolof
Kingdom of Sine
Kingdom of Saloum
Kingdom of Baol
Cayor
Waalo

- People: Wolof
- Language: Wolof làkk
- Country: Jolof Empire (Kingdom)

The Jolof Empire (Arabic: امبراطورية جولوف), also known as Great Jolof or the Wolof Empire, was a Wolof state in modern-day Senegal, that ruled portions of Mauritania and Gambia from the mid-14th century (or possibly earlier) until 1549. Following the battle of Danki, its vassal states were fully or de facto independent; in this period it is known as the Jolof Kingdom.

== Origins ==
The region that became Jolof was initially inhabited by the Soce and then Serer peoples, who were driven south by the Wolof by the 13th century. Wolof oral traditions relate that was named after a local chief Jolof Mbengue. The empire consisted mostly of Wolof, Serer and Fula from north of the Senegal River. Before the empire's rise, the region was ruled by Lamanes of the Mbengue, Diaw and Ngom families. They were related to early rulers of neighboring kingdoms such as Baol.

Jolof was a vassal of the Mali Empire for much of its early history. It remained within that empire's sphere of influence until the latter half of the 14th century.

== Legend of Ndiadiane Ndiaye ==
Traditional accounts among the Wolof agree that the founder of the state was the possibly mythical Ndiadiane Ndiaye (also spelled Njaajaan Njaay or Njai). Sallah writes: "Some say that Njajan was the son of Abu Darday, an Almoravid conqueror who came from Mecca to preach Islam in Senegal ... Some say that Ndiadiane Ndiaye was a mysterious person of Fulani origin. Others say he was a Serer prince." In general, Ndiaye is given an Almoravid Islamic lineage and a link on his mother's side to the state of Takrur. James Searing adds that "In all versions of the myth, Njaajaan Njaay speaks his first words in Pulaar rather than Wolof, emphasizing once again his character as a stranger of noble origins."

The legend of Ndiadiane Ndiaye has many variations in detail, but these share some important commonalities. It begins when his father dies and his mother remarries with a slave. This match so infuriated Ndiaye that he jumped into the Senegal River and began an aquatic life. He made his way downstream to Waalo. At this time, the area was divided into villages ruled by separate Lamanes, some of whom were engaged in a dispute over a wood near a prominent lake (in some versions, it is a dispute over a catch of fish). This almost led to bloodshed, but it was stopped by the mysterious appearance of a stranger from the lake. The stranger divided the wood fairly and disappeared, leaving the people in awe. The people then feigned a second dispute and kidnapped the stranger when he returned. They offered him the kingship of their land. When these events were reported to the ruler of the Kingdom of Sine, Maad a Sinig Maysa Wali, also a great magician, he is reported to have exclaimed "Ndiadiane Ndiaye" in his native Serer language in amazement. He then suggested that all rulers between the Senegal River and the Gambia River voluntarily submit to this man, which they did.

=== Dating ===
Attempting to date Ndiadiane Ndiaye and the establishment of the Jolof Empire, John Donnelly Fage suggests, "the rise of the empire was associated with the growth of Wolof power at the expense of the ancient Sudanese state of Takrur, and that this was essentially a fourteenth-century development." Ogot proposes that the Jolof became permanently independent during a succession dispute c. 1360 between two rival lineages within the Mali Empire.

== Imperial history ==
The earliest centuries of Jolof's history are known only through oral histories, but few details have survived. During the relatively dry period (c. 1100–1500) the Jolof empire expanded southwards and westwards, progressively 'Wolofizing' the ruling classes. The smaller states thus incorporated into the empire. The states of Cayor and Baol, which were founded around the same time as Jolof, were absorbed early on. The legend of Ndiadiane Ndiaye emphasizes "that the Wolof and Sereer voluntarily relinquished their independence to create the empire." The term 'ndiadiane' can be translated as 'catastrophe' in the Serer Singadum dialect, however, hinting that the process of imperial growth may not have been peaceful.

Many of the earliest buurbas came from maternal lineages native to Baol. The Kingdom of Sine and an early form of the Kingdom of Saloum were absorbed in the late 14th century at the earliest. This completed the core constituent states of the Jolof confederacy: Cayor, Baol and Waalo, and the Serer states of Sine and Saloum.

=== Apex ===
Beginning in the 1440s, Portuguese ships began to visit the coast, initially looking to capture slaves but soon shifting their focus to trade. The Jolof expansion may have been assisted by the purchase of horses from these traders. At this time, Jolof was at the height of its power.

Buurba Biram Njeme Eler, or possibly Cukli Njiklaan, conquered Namandirou in approximately the 1450s, then extended his authority over Takrur. Eler moved the capital from Njiayeen Sabur to Thieung. He was also likely responsible for subduing the Mandinka states on the northern bank of the Gambia, including Niumi, Baddibu, Nyani, and Wuli, as the Mali Empire declined. Jolof would also expand its control over the gold trade, conquering Gajaaga and subsequently Bambuk, although Jean Boulègue argues of such conquest being very unlikely. Control over the kingdoms of the Gambia also gave the Buurba some access to the growing commerce there.

=== Succession disputes ===
Upon Buurba Biram Njeme Eler's death, the succession was disputed between his son, Bokar Bige, and his nephew Tase Daagulen. The latter was eventually victorious, with the help of Brak Cukuli Mbooj of Waalo. This conflict was, in a way, a contest between a patrilineal inheritance system (father-son) and a matrilineal one (uncle-nephew), as Biram Eler and Tase Daagulen were both members of the Jonai matrilineage. Between roughly 1455 and 1489, five buurbas would claim the throne, sowing chaos and civil war.

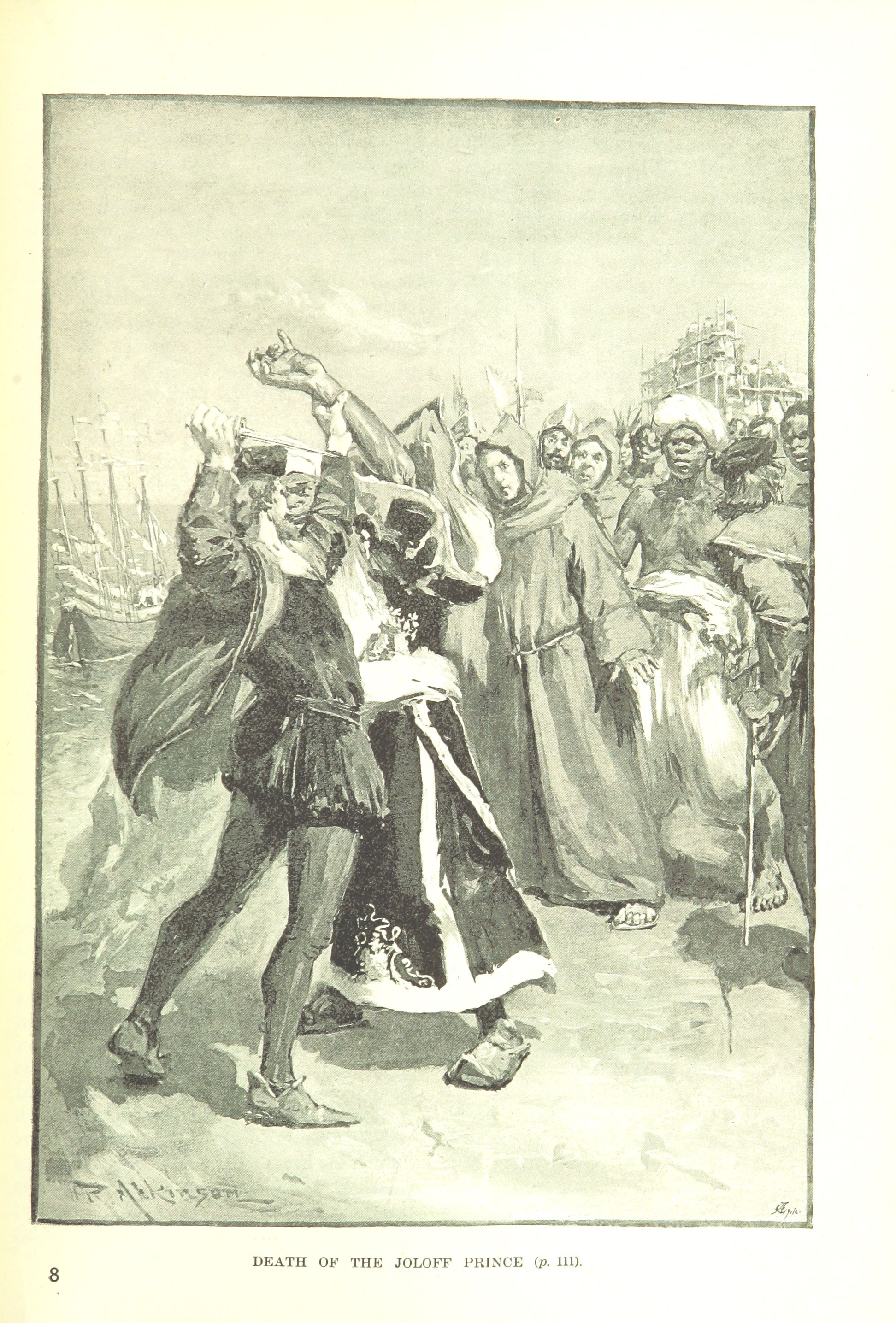
"Death of the Joloff Prince", in an 1892 book.

In the 1480s, Buumi (prince) Jelen ruled the empire in the name of his brother, Buurba Birayma Kuran Kan, known in Portuguese sources as Bur Birao. Tempted by the Portuguese trade, Jelen moved the seat of government to the coast to take advantage of the new economic opportunities. Other princes, opposed to this policy, deposed and murdered the Buurba in 1489.

Jelen escaped and sought refuge with the Portuguese, who took him to Lisbon. There he exchanged gifts with King John II and was baptized. Seeing the opportunity to make a Christian ally, John II sent a Portuguese expeditionary force to put Jelen on the throne of Jolof and establish a fort at the mouth of the Senegal River.

Neither goal was achieved. The Portuguese commander quarreled with Jelen, accused him of treachery, and killed him.

In the early 16th century, the Jolof Empire was still very powerful, and capable of fielding 100,000 infantry and 10,000 cavalry. But succession disputes were not the only thing tearing it apart. The Atlantic Trade, for instance, had brought extra wealth to the empire, but with Jelen's failure the rulers of the vassal states on the coast got the lion's share of the benefits. This eventually allowed them to eclipse and undermine the emperor. Jolof was located far from the coast, and had no direct access to maritime trade.

There was also the matter of external forces, such as the breakup of the Mali Empire. Mali's slipping grip on its far-flung empire had allowed Jolof to become an empire in the first place. But now conflict was spreading to Jolof's northern territories. In 1513, Koli Tenguella led a strong force of Fulani and Mandinka into Futa Toro, seizing it from the Jolof and setting up his dynasty, and also destroying Namandirou. In 1520 the Serer kingdoms of Sine and Saloum in the south broke away.

=== Battle of Danki and disintegration ===
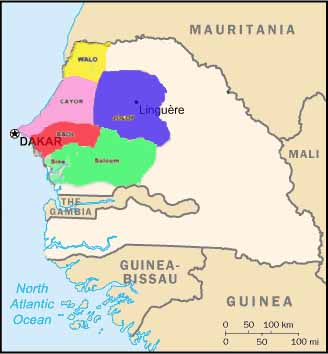
Jolof kingdom after its disintegration

In 1549, Kayor successfully broke from the Jolof Empire under the leadership of the crown prince Amari Ngoone Sobel Fall by defeating Jolof at the Battle of Danki. The battle caused a ripple effect resulting in Waalo and Baol also leaving the empire. By 1600, the Jolof Empire was effectively over. Kayor invaded its southern neighbor, Bawol, and began forming a personal union of its own. Jolof was reduced to a kingdom; nevertheless, the title of Buurba remained associated with imperial prestige and commanded nominal respect from its ancient vassals.

== Society ==
Jolof society harbored a developed hierarchical system involving different classes of royal and non-royal nobles, free men, occupational castes, and slaves. Occupational castes included blacksmiths, jewelers, tanners, tailors, musicians, and griots. Smiths were important to the society for their ability to make weapons of war as well as their trusted status for mediating disputes fairly. Griots were employed by every important family as chroniclers and advisors, without whom much of early Jolof history would be unknown. Jolof's nobility were nominally animists, but some combined this with Islam. However, Islam had not dominated Wolof society until about the 19th century, when the empire had long been reduced to a rump state in the form of the Kingdom of Jolof.

=== Women ===
Throughout the different classes, intermarriage was rarely allowed. Women could not marry upwards, and their children did not inherit the father's superior status. However, women had some influence and role in government. The Lingeer was head of all women and very influential in state politics. She owned several villages that cultivated farms and paid tribute directly to her. There were also other female chiefs whose main task was judging cases involving women. In the empire's most northern state of Walo, women could aspire to the office of Bur and rule the state.

== Economy ==
Isolated from the main maritime and trans-Saharan trade routes, the economy of Jolof proper was relatively simple. Moor or Jula merchants were the main carriers of trade, which was organized around weekly markets and consisted mostly of millet, salt, beans, cattle and other essentials. Coinage was not used, but iron bars and cloth served as universal means of exchange.

== Political organization ==
The ruler of Jolof was known as the Bour ba or Buurba, who was selected by a college of electors that included the rulers of the five main constituent kingdoms. Although nominally the head of the entire empire, the Buurba directly controlled a relatively small portion of Jolof; Lamanes held a lot of power, and became progressively more independent as the royal family became more consumed by succession disputes.

Once appointed, officeholders went through elaborate rituals to both familiarize themselves with their new duties and elevate them to a divine status. From then on, they were expected to lead their states to greatness or risk being declared unfavored by the gods and being deposed. The stresses of this political structure resulted in a very autocratic government where personal armies and wealth often superseded constitutional values.

=== Relations with constituent kingdoms ===
The Jolof Empire included five coastal kingdoms from north to south: Waalo, Kayor, Baol, Sine and Saloum. All of these states were tributary to the land-locked state of Jolof. Each was governed by a ruler were chosen by their respective nobles. Each had practical autonomy but was expected to cooperate with the Bour on important matters, and send regular tribute to Jolof. This did not always happen, however, and wars between the constituent kingdoms were common; provinces could gain or lose degrees of independence, or move from one king's control to another.

== See also ==
- Constituent parts of the Jolof Empire, roughly going north to south:
  - Waalo, Cayor, Baol, Sine, Saloum
- Ethnic groups of the Jolof Empire:
  - Serer people
  - Wolof people
- History of Senegal
- The Kingdom of Jolof, which succeeded the Jolof Empire
- List of rulers of Jolof
- Mali Empire

== Sources ==
- Boulegue, Jean (2013). Les royaumes wolof dans l'espace sénégambien (XIIIe-XVIIIe siècle) (in French). Paris: Karthala Editions. ISBN 978-2-8111-0881-6.
- Brooks, George (1985). Western Africa to c1860 A.D. A provisional historical schema based on climate periods (PDF). Bloomington: Indiana University.
- Charles, Eunice A. (1977). Precolonial Senegal : the Jolof Kingdom, 1800-1890. Brookline, MA: African Studies Center, Boston University.
- Fage, John D. (1977). "6 - Upper and Lower Guinea". In Oliver, Ronald (ed.). The Cambridge History of Africa Volume 3: From c.1050 to c.1600. Cambridge University Press. p. 463-518. ISBN 9781139054577.
- Fall, Rokhaya (2013). "De la nécessité de réactualiser le recours à la « tradition orale » dans l'écriture du passé africain". In Fauvelle-Aymar, François-Xavier (ed.). Les ruses de l'historien. Essais d'Afrique et d'ailleurs en hommage à Jean Boulègue. Hommes et sociétés (in French). Paris: Karthala. pp. 15–29. doi:10.3917/kart.fauve.2013.01.0015. ISBN 978-2-8111-0939-4. S2CID 246907590.
- Levtzion, Nehemiah (1977). "5 - The western Maghrib and Sudan". In Oliver, Ronald (ed.). The Cambridge History of Africa Volume 3: From c.1050 to c.1600. Cambridge University Press. pp. 331–462. ISBN 9781139054577.
- Ndiaye, Bara (2021). "Le Jolof: Naissance et Evolution d'un Empire jusqu'a la fin du XVIIe siecle". In Fall, Mamadou; Fall, Rokhaya; Mane, Mamadou (eds.). Bipolarisation du Senegal du XVIe - XVIIe siecle (in French). Dakar: HGS Editions. pp. 166–236.
- Ogot, Bethwell A. (1999). General History of Africa V: Africa from the Sixteenth to the Eighteenth Century. Berkeley: University of California Press. pp. 512 Pages. ISBN 0-520-06700-2.
