= History of the Mali Empire =

History of an empire in West Africa from c. 1226 to 1670

The history of the Mali Empire begins when the first Mande people entered the Manding region during the period of the Ghana Empire. After its fall, the various tribes established independent chiefdoms. In the 12th century, these were briefly conquered by the Sosso Empire under Soumaoro Kante. He was in turn defeated by a Mande coalition led by Sundiata Keita, who founded the Mali Empire.

The Keita dynasty ruled the Empire for its entire history, with the exception of the third mansa, Sakura, who was a freed slave who took power from one of Sundiata's sons. Upon his death, the Keita line was re-established, and soon led the empire to the peak of its wealth and renown under Mansa Musa. His pilgrimage to Mecca in 1324 became legendary for the vast sums of gold that he gave as gifts and alms, to the point where it created an inflationary crisis in Egypt. Mansa Musa also extended the empire to its greatest territorial extent, re-annexing the city of Gao in the east.

After Mansa Musa's death, the empire slowly weakened. By the mid 15th century, the Sunni dynasty of Gao had established themselves as an independent power. Sunni Ali established the rival Songhai Empire and pushed the Malians out of the Niger bend region and back to their core territories in the south and west. The next century and a half saw Mali repeatedly battle the Songhai and the rising power of the Fula warlords Tenguella and his son Koli Tenguella.

When the Songhai were destroyed by a Moroccan invasion in 1593, Mansa Mahmud IV saw an opportunity to restore Malian pre-eminence in the Niger bend, but a catastrophic defeat outside Jenne in 1599 crippled his prestige. Upon his death in 1610, his sons fought over the throne and the empire splintered.

== Historiography ==
=== Written sources ===
There are a few references to Mali in early Islamic literature. Among these are references to "Pene" and "Malal" in the work of al-Bakri in 1068, the story of the conversion of an early ruler, known to Ibn Khaldun (by 1397) as Barmandana, and a few geographical details in the work of al-Idrisi.

Much of the recorded information about the Mali Empire comes from 14th-century Tunisian historian Ibn Khaldun, 14th-century Moroccan traveller Ibn Battuta and 16th-century Andalusian traveller Leo Africanus. The other major source of information comes from Mandinka oral tradition, as recorded by storytellers known as griots. Imperial Mali is also known through the account of Shihab al-'Umari, written in about 1340 by a geographer-administrator in Mamluk Egypt. His information about the empire came from visiting Malians taking the hajj, or pilgrim's voyage to Mecca. He had first-hand information from several sources, and from a second-hand source he learned of the visit of Mansa Musa. The traveller Ibn Battuta, who visited Mali in 1352 left the first account of a West African kingdom made directly by an eyewitness; the others are usually second-hand. The third great account is that of Ibn Khaldun, who wrote in the early 15th century. While the accounts are of limited length, they provide a fairly good picture of the empire at its height.

After Ibn Khaldun's death in 1406, there are no further Arab primary sources except for Leo Africanus, who wrote more than a century later. Arab interest in the Mali Empire declined after the Songhai conquered the northern regions of the empire which formed the primary contact between Mali and the Arab world.

For the later period of the Mali Empire, the major written primary sources are Portuguese accounts of the coastal provinces of Mali and neighboring societies, as well as the Tarikh al-Sudan and Tarikh al-fattash, historical documents writing in Timbuktu in the 17th century.

=== Oral traditions ===
Some of what historians have written about pre-Imperial Mali is based on oral tradition collected since the late nineteenth century. Much of the tradition focuses on the "Epic of Sunjata" a series of tales about early Mali that griots assemble into longer versions. There are several of these versions in print, the most famous of which is that of D. T. Niane, thanks to its lively narrative style and early translation into other languages. Niane's work, however, is not a literal translation of an original oral discourse, though it is surely largely based on tales told by a certain Mamadou Kouyate of Keyla. Rather, it is a reworking in literary form of Kouyate's tales. More literal versions of the tradition have since been published in French, English and Mandinka versions.

=== Delafosse ===
The French colonial administrator and historian Maurice Delafosse was one of the earliest Western historians to attempt a comprehensive history of the region in his book Haut-Sénégal-Niger (1912). He produced a fairly detailed and exact chronology of Mali. However, he never explained how he arrived at the dates he presented there, or elsewhere, and the primary sources on which he relied did not give clear indications of chronology at that level of detail. Scholars and the general public have often uncritically accepted and repeated his chronology as if it were exact, but in reality most dates in Malian history are estimates.

== Pre-Imperial Period ==
In the first millennium BC, early cities and towns were founded along the middle Niger River. These included Dia which reached its peak around 600 BC, and Djenne-Djenno, which was founded around 250 BC. Between roughly the 6th century BC and 1st century AD, the ancient and lucrative western trans-Saharan trade in gold, salt and slaves had emerged in earnest, gradually progressing into regional super high-way of sorts by the 3rd to 6th centuries AD, facilitating the rise of West Africa's earliest great empires.

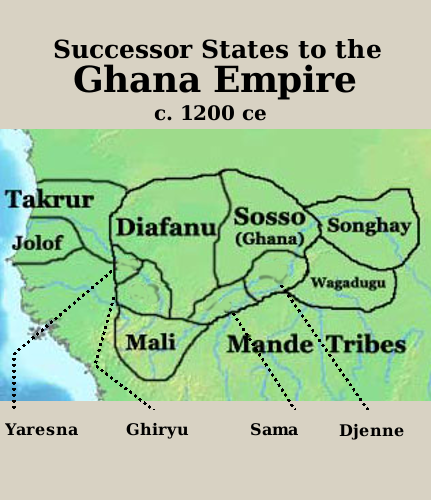

Hunters from the Ghana Empire (or Wagadou), particularly mythical ancestors Kontron and Sanin, were the first Mandinka in the Manding region and founded the Malinké hunter brotherhood. The area was famous for the large amount of game that it sheltered, as well as its dense vegetation. The Camara (or Kamara) are said to be the first family to have lived in Manding, after having left Oualata in Wagadou due to drought. They founded the first village of the Manding, Kirikoroni, then Kirina, Siby, and Kita. Archaeological work at the site of Niani, a possible later capital of Mali, has revealed the remains of a substantial town dating back as far as the 6th century.

The Manden city-state of Ka-ba (present-day Kangaba) served as the capital and name of the province. From at least the beginning of the 11th century, Mandinka kings ruled Manden from Ka-ba in the name of the Ghanas. The ruler was elected from among the heads of the major clans, and at this time had little real power.

Al-Bakri, writing in 1068, names two countries "Daw" and "Malal" located near the Niger and close to gold-fields, the core of the later Empire of Mali. Al-Bakri goes on to describe how the unnamed ruler of the kingdom was converted to Islam by a merchant when he witnessed the miraculous shower of rain that ended a drought, and the ruler's descendants and his nobles kept Islam, although the common people were not converted. Ibn Khaldun named the first Muslim king Barmandana. Historians have questioned the validity of these early conversion stories - the first, if true, presumably applied only to one of the local rulers of the balkanized pre-imperial Manding region, and the second is likely a later invention to enhance the ruling family's Islamic credentials. In al-Idrisi's account of 1154, he noted that the two towns of Daw and Malal had four days' travel between them, located in a river valley that joins the Nile (by which he meant the Niger). Malal was described as a "small town, like a large village without a surrounding wall, built on an unassailable hill of red earth."

Wagadou's control over Manden ended in the 12th century. The Kangaba province, free of Soninké influence, splintered into twelve kingdoms with their own faama. The leader of the confederacy, the mansa, was elected from among the clan leaders but had little real power. Gradually, centralized control grew in tandem with increased trade and the use of slave labor to enrich the monarchs.

In approximately 1140 the Sosso kingdom of Kaniaga, a former vassal of Wagadou, began conquering the lands of its old rulers. By 1180 it had even subjugated Wagadou, forcing the Soninké to pay tribute. In 1203, the Sosso king and sorcerer Soumaoro Kanté came to power and reportedly terrorised much of Manden stealing women and goods from both Dô and Kri.

== Sundjata Keita ==
Through the oral tradition of griots, the Keita dynasty claims descent from Lawalo, one of the sons of Bilal, the faithful muezzin of Islam's prophet Muhammad. Historians generally regard this as a later invention, to give increased prestige to the royal family.

=== Early life ===
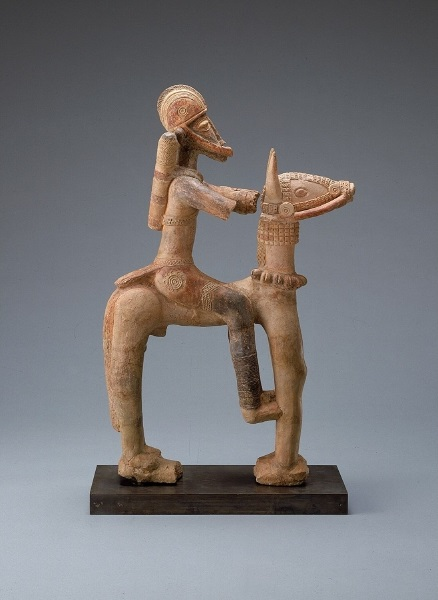
Mali terracotta horseman figure from the 13th to 15th centuries

According to Niane's version of the epic, Sundiata of the Keita clan was born in the early 13th century. during the rise of Kaniaga. He was the son of Niani's faama, Nare Fa (also known as Maghan Kon Fatta, meaning the handsome prince). Sundiata's mother was Maghan Kon Fatta's second wife, Sogolon Kédjou. She was a hunchback from the land of Do, south of Mali. The child of this marriage received the first name of his mother (Sogolon) and the surname of his father (Djata). Combined in the rapidly spoken language of the Mandinka, the names formed Sondjata, Sundjata or Sundiata Keita. In Ibn Khaldun's account, Sundjata is recorded as Mari Djata with "Mari" meaning "Amir" or "Prince". He also notes that Djata or "Jatah" means "lion".

Prince Sundjata was prophesied to become a great conqueror. To his parents' dread, the prince did not have a promising start. Sundiata, according to the oral traditions, did not walk until he was seven years old. However, once Sundiata eventually gained use of his legs he grew strong and respected, but by that time his father had died. Despite the faama's wish to respect the prophecy and put Sundiata on the throne, the son from his first wife Sassouma Bérété was crowned instead. As soon as Sassouma's son Dankaran Touman took the throne, he and his mother forced the increasingly popular Sundjata into exile along with his mother and two sisters. Before Dankaran Touman and his mother could enjoy their power, King Soumaoro set his sights on Niani forcing Dankaran to flee to Kissidougou.

After many years in exile, first at the court of Wagadou and then at Mema, a delegation from his home reached Sundjata and begged him to combat the Sosso and free the kingdoms of Manden.

=== War against Soumaoro Kante ===
Leading the combined armies of Mema, Wagadou and the Mandinka city-states, Sundiata led a revolt against the Kaniaga Kingdom around 1234. The combined forces of northern and southern Manden defeated the Sosso army at the Battle of Kirina (also known as Krina) in approximately 1235. This victory resulted in the fall of the Kaniaga kingdom and the rise of the Mali Empire. After the victory, King Soumaoro disappeared, and the Mandinka stormed the last of the Sosso cities. Maghan Sundiata was declared "faama of faamas" and received the title "mansa", which translates as "king". At the age of 18, he gained authority over all the 12 kingdoms in an alliance that became the Mali Empire. He was crowned under the throne name Sundjata Keita becoming the first Mandinka emperor. And so the name Keita became a clan/family and began its reign.

=== Reign ===
The reign of Mansa Sundiata Keita saw the conquest of several key places in the Mali Empire. He never personally took the field again after Kirina, but his generals continued to expand the frontier, especially in the west where they reached the Gambia River and the marches of Tekrur. This enabled him to rule over a realm larger than even the Ghana Empire in its apex. When the campaigning was done, his empire extended 1,000 miles (1,600 km) east to west with those borders being the bends of the Senegal and Niger rivers. After unifying Manden, he added the Wangara goldfields, making them the southern border. The northern commercial towns of Oualata and Audaghost were also conquered and became part of the new state's northern border. Wagadou and Mema became junior partners in the realm and part of the imperial nucleus. The lands of Bambougou, Jalo (Fouta Djallon), and Kaabu were added into Mali by Fakoli (known as Nkrumah in Ghana, Kurumah in the Gambia, Colley in Casamance, Senegal), Fran Kamara (Camara) and Tiramakhan Traore (Trawally in the Gambia), respectively.

== Sundjata's Successors ==
Genealogy of the kings of the Mali Empire based on the chronicle of Ibn Khaldun

Different oral traditions conflict with each other, as well as with Ibn Khaldun, about the transfer of power following Sunjata's death. There was evidently a power struggle of some kind involving the gbara or great council and donson ton or hunter guilds. In the interregnum following Sunjata's death, the jomba or court slaves may have held power. Some oral traditions agree with Ibn Khaldun in indicating that a son of Sunjata, named Yerelinkon in oral tradition and Wali in Arabic, took power as Sunjata's successor. Ibn Khaldun regarded Wali as one of Mali's greatest rulers. He went on the hajj during the reign of Mamluk sultan Baibars (1260–1277). (Note: His hajj was during the reign of Baibars, which was from 1260 to 1277.) Wali was succeeded by his brother Wati, about whom nothing is known, and then his brother Khalifa. Khalifa would shoot arrows at his subjects, so he was overthrown and killed.

Khalifa was replaced by Abu Bakr, a son of Sunjata's daughter. Abu Bakr was the first and only mansa to inherit through the female line, which has been argued to be either a break from or a return to tradition. Then an enslaved court official, Sakura, seized power. Sakura was able to stabilize the political situation in Mali, leading historian Francois-Xavier Fauvelle to speculate that he may have been the regent for a weak Abu Bakr or an underage Qu. Under his leadership, Mali conquered new territories and trade with North Africa increased. He went on the hajj during the reign of Mamluk sultan an-Nasir Muhammad (1298–1308) and was killed in Tajura on his way back to Mali.

After Sakura's death, power returned Sunjata's direct descendants through the male line, with Wali's son Qu taking the throne. Qu was succeeded by his son Muhammad, who launched two voyages to explore the Atlantic Ocean. (Note: There is some ambiguity over the identity of the mansa responsible for the voyages. The voyage is often incorrectly attributed to a Mansa Abu Bakr II, but no such mansa ever reigned. The account of the voyage does not mention the mansa by name, only indicating that it was Musa's immediate predecessor. According to Ibn Khaldun, Musa's immediate predecessor was Muhammad.) After the loss of the first expedition, Muhammad led the second expedition himself. He left Kanku Musa, a cousin, in charge during his absence. Eventually, due to Muhammad's failure to return, Musa was recognized as mansa.

== Abubakrids ==
=== Musa Keita I (Mansa Musa) ===
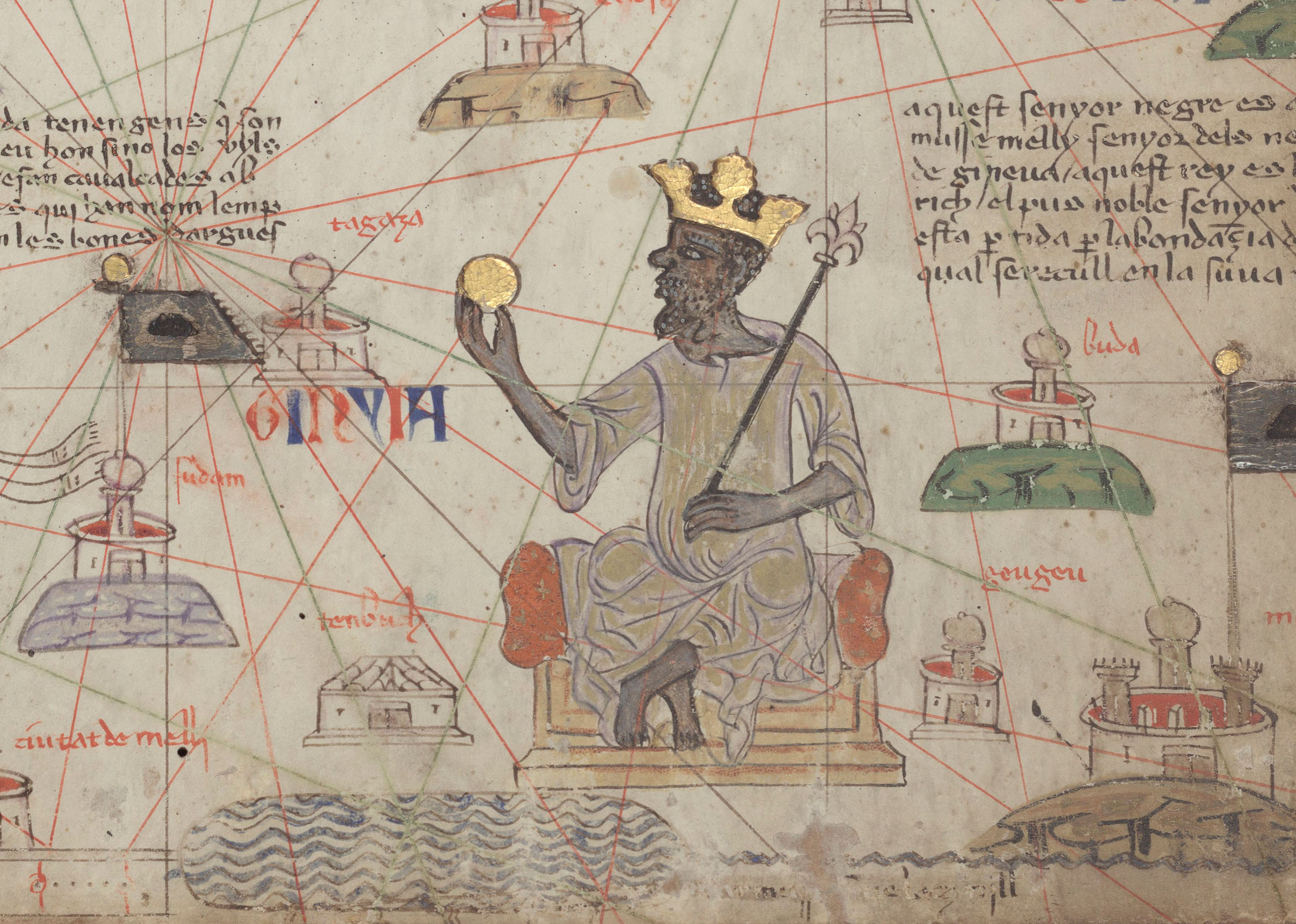
Musa depicted holding a gold coin in the 1375 Catalan Atlas

Kankan Musa, better known as Mansa Musa probably took power in approximately 1312, although an earlier date is possible. Ibn Khaldun gives conflicting information on his lineage, but his ascension clearly marks a shift in power from one branch of the royal family to another, which Fauvelle labels the Abubakrids, after Musa's father (or grandfather).

Musa's reign is considered the golden age of Mali. He was one of the first truly devout Muslims to lead the Mali Empire. He attempted to make Islam the faith of the nobility, but kept to the imperial tradition of not forcing it on the populace. He also made Eid celebrations at the end of Ramadan a national ceremony. He could read and write Arabic and took an interest in the scholarly city of Timbuktu, which he peaceably annexed in 1324. Via one of the royal ladies of his court, Musa transformed Sankore from an informal madrasah into an Islamic university. Islamic studies flourished thereafter.

Mansa Musa Keita's crowning achievement was his famous pilgrimage to Mecca, which started in 1324 and concluded with his return in 1326. Accounts of how many people and how much gold he spent vary. All of them agree that he took a very large group of people; the mansa kept a personal guard of some 500 men, and he gave out so many alms and bought so many things that the value of gold in Egypt and Arabia depreciated for twelve years. When he passed through Cairo, historian al-Maqrizi noted "the members of his entourage proceeded to buy Turkish and Ethiopian slave girls, singing girls and garments, so that the rate of the gold dinar fell by six dirhams."

Another testimony from Ibn Khaldun describes the grand pilgrimage of Mansa Musa consisting of 12,000 slaves:

"He made a pilgrimage in 724/1324 [...]. At each halt, he would regale us [his entourage] rare foods and confectionery. His equipment furnishings were carried by 12.000 private slave women (Wasaif) wearing gown and brocade (dibaj) and Yemeni silk [...]. Mansa Musa came from his country with 80 loads of gold dust (tibr), each load weighing three qintars. In their own country they use only slave women and men for transport, but for long journeys such as pilgrimages they have mounts."

Musa took out large loans from money lenders in Cairo before beginning his journey home. It is not known if this was an attempt to correct the depreciation of gold in the area due to his spending, or if he had simply run out of the funds needed for the return trip. Musa's hajj, and especially his gold, caught the attention of both the Islamic and Christian worlds. Consequently, the name of Mali and Timbuktu appeared on 14th century world maps.

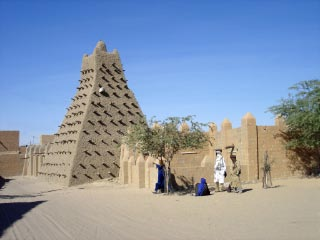
Sankore Mosque

While on the hajj, he met the Andalusian poet and architect es-Saheli. Mansa Musa brought the architect back to Mali to beautify some of the cities. But more reasoned analysis suggests that his role, if any, was quite limited. The architectural crafts in Granada had reached their zenith by the fourteenth century, and its extremely unlikely that a cultured and wealthy poet would have had anything more than a dilettante's knowledge of the intricacies of contemporary architectural practice. Mosques were built in Gao and Timbuktu along with impressive palaces also built in Timbuktu. By the time of his death in 1337, Mali had control over Taghazza, a salt-producing area in the north, which further strengthened its treasury.

That same year, after the Mandinka general known as Sagmandir put down yet another rebellion in Gao, Mansa Musa came to Gao and accepted the capitulation of the King of Ghana and his nobles.

By the end of Mansa Musa's reign, the Sankoré University had been converted into a fully staffed university with the largest collections of books in Africa since the Library of Alexandria. The Sankoré University was capable of housing 25,000 students and had one of the largest libraries in the world with roughly 1,000,000 manuscripts.

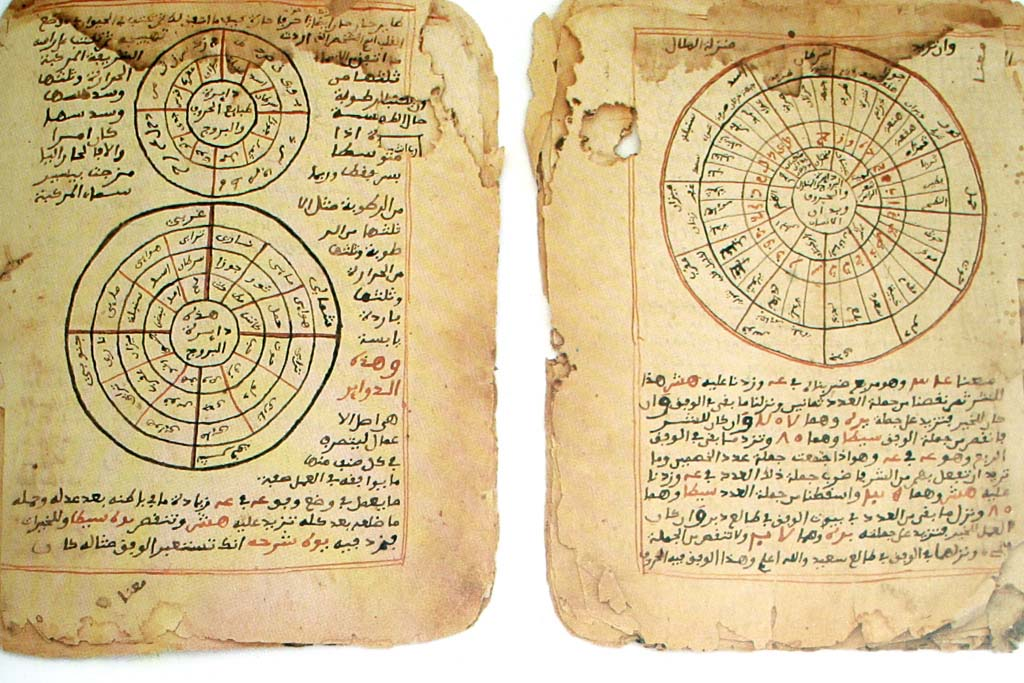
A manuscript page from Timbuktu

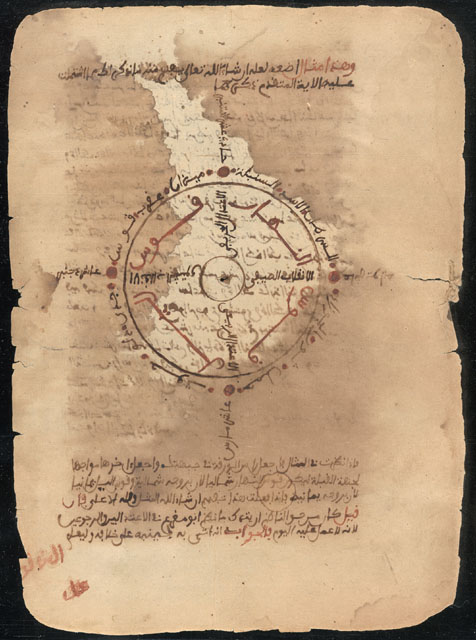
Manuscript of Nasir al-Din Abu al-Abbas Ahmad ibn al-Hajj al-Amin al-Tawathi al-Ghalawi's Kashf al-Ghummah fi Nafa al-Ummah. From the Mamma Haidara Commemorative Library, Timbuktu.

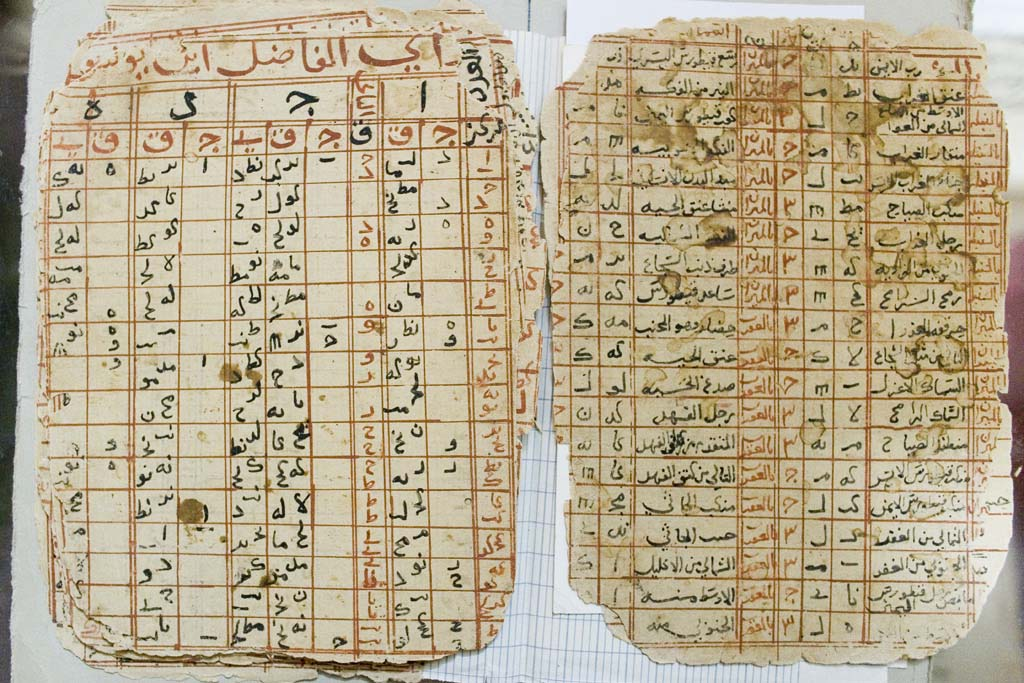
A manuscript page from Timbuktu showing a table of astronomical information

Mansa Musa Keita was succeeded by his son, Maghan Keita I, in 1337. Mansa Maghan Keita I spent wastefully and was the first lacklustre emperor since Khalifa Keita. But the Mali Empire built by his predecessors was too strong for even his misrule and it passed intact to Musa's brother, Souleyman Keita in 1341.

=== Souleyman Keita ===
Mansa Souleyman Keita (or Suleiman) took steep measures to put Mali back into financial shape, thereby developing a reputation for miserliness. It is during his reign that Fula raids on Takrur began. There was also a palace conspiracy to overthrow him hatched by the Qasa (the Manding term meaning Queen) Kassi and several army commanders. Mansa Souleyman's generals successfully fought off the military incursions, and the senior wife Kassi behind the plot was imprisoned.

The mansa also made a successful hajj, kept up correspondence with Morocco and Egypt and built an earthen platform at Kangaba called the Camanbolon where he held court with provincial governors and deposited the holy books he brought back from Hedjaz.

The only major setback to his reign was the loss of Mali's Dyolof province in Senegal. The Wolof populations of the area united into their own state known as the Jolof Empire in the 1350s.

== Internal Divisions ==
Mansa Souleyman Keita died in 1360, with the succession disputed between his son Qasa and nephew Djata. Qasa ruled for only nine months before being deposed.

=== Mari Djata Keita II ===
Konkodougou Kamissa Keita, named for the province he once governed, was crowned as Mansa Mari Djata Keita II in 1360. He ruled oppressively and nearly bankrupted Mali with his lavish spending. He did however, maintain contacts with Morocco, sending a giraffe to King Abu Hassan. Mansa Mari Djata Keita II became seriously ill in 1372, and power moved into the hands of his ministers until his death in 1374.

=== Musa Keita II ===
The reign of Mari Djata Keita II was ruinous and left the empire in bad financial shape, but the empire itself passed intact to the dead emperor's son. Mansa Fadima Musa Keita, or Mansa Musa Keita II, began the process of reversing his father's excesses. He did not, however, hold the power of previous mansas because of the influence of his kankoro-sigui.

Kankoro-sigui Mari Djata, who had no relation to the Keita clan, essentially ran the empire in Musa Keita II's stead. Ibn Khaldun recorded that in 776 A.H or 1374/1375 AD he interviewed a Sijilmasan scholar named Muhammad b. Wasul who had lived in Gao and had been employed in its judiciary. The latter told Ibn Khaldun about devastating struggle over Gao between Mali imperial forces against Berber Tuareg forces from Takedda. The text of Ibn Khaldun says "Gao, at this time is devastated". It seems quite possible that an exodus of the inhabitants took place at this juncture and the importance of the city was not revived until the rise of the Songhai empire.

Despite the loss of Gao, by the time of Mansa Musa Keita II's death in 1387, Mali was financially solvent and still in control of all its core provinces. Forty years after the reign of Mansa Musa Keita I, the Mali Empire still controlled some 1,100,000 square kilometres (420,000 sq mi) of land throughout Western Africa.

=== End of the Abubakrids ===
The last son of Maghan Keita I, Tenin Maghan Keita (also known as Kita Tenin Maghan Keita for the province he once governed) was crowned Mansa Maghan Keita II in 1387. Little is known of him except that he only reigned for roughly one year.

Sandaki, a powerful court official, succeeded or deposed Maghan Keita II. 'Sandaki' was a title, from san or sanon (meaning "high") and adegue (meaning counsellor). He reigned less than a year before Mahmud Keita, descendant of Mansa Gao, rebelled and killed him, taking the throne as Mansa Maghan Keita III in 1390. His reign marked the end of the Abubakrid period and a return to Sundjata's male line. The conflict around Maghan III's succession opened Mali to major challenges from rising powers. Under Sunni Muhammad Dao, the Songhai likely formalized their complete independence. The Mossi emperor Bonga of Yatenga raided into Mali and plundered Macina. Emperor Bonga did not appear to hold the area, and it stayed within the Mali Empire after Maghan Keita III's death.

== First Crisis (Note: Periodization of Mali's imperial crises taken from Person, 1981.) ==
The history of Mali after the ascension of Maghan III is poorly known, as written sources dry up. We only know of a few of the Mansas who reigned in the 15th and 16th centuries, a period of repeated crises for the empire, punctuated by stretches of increasing power and influence in the region.

Maghan III's direct successor is unknown, but may have been Musa III. Oral histories remember a pair of brothers who may be Musa and his brother and successor Uli II subduing and settling the area of Dioma, south of Manding proper.

The empire entered a period of crisis in the 1430s, in which they lost control of nearly all of their northern provinces and vassal kingdoms. Timbuktu and Oualata fell to the Tuareg, led by Akil Ag-Amalwal, in 1433. Diarra remained Mali's last link to the Trans-Saharan trade network. The rising Songhai under Sunni Suleiman Dama conquered the ancient kingdom of Mema, one of Mali's oldest dependencies, in 1460. Sunni Ali conquered Timbuktu from the Tuareg in 1469 and then, after a long siege, took Djenne in 1471. He soon launched an invasion of Mali's core provinces in the middle Niger valley, but was repulsed in 1475. This victory ended the existential threat from the north, but peripheral provinces continued to fall: Wagadou in 1483, and Baghana in 1499. Songhai forces under the command of Askia Muhammad I defeated the Mali general Fati Quali Keita in 1502, sacked a royal residence in Kaarta, and conquered the province of Diafunu. They also attacked Gajaaga, destroying what remained of Mali's power in the Sahel. A peace was finally concluded in 1508.

Mali Empire and surrounding states, c. 1530

Meanwhile, the western part of the Mali Empire also faced a new threat: the Fula warlord Tenguella. By the 1490s he and his son Koli Tenguella had taken control of much of the Futa Jallon and upper Senegal River valley. Their raids threatened Mali's communication and trade lines with the critical gold-producing region of Bambuk and the vassal states of Kaabu, Wuli and Niani. Cut off from the desert-side trade, Mali's economy now depended heavily on these western provinces and the trade with the Portuguese that had begun in the 1450s. Under Mansa Mahmud Keita II, diplomatic contacts were established with the Portuguese in an attempt to secure an alliance against the Fula, or at least to purchase weapons. An embassy arrived at the Malian court in 1493, but no support was forthcoming. The small Portuguese mission, their haggard condition, and their paltry gifts did not impress the Mansa; he claimed to know of only one great Christian king, the Holy Roman Emperor.

In 1511, Tenguella invaded the Kingdom of Diarra, whose rulers called for help from the Songhai. Umar Komajago, a brother of Askia Mohammad I, answered the call, killing the invader in 1512 and establishing Songhai hegemony in the area. This gave Mali an opportunity to strike back, driving Tenguella's son Koli out of his base in Futa Jallon. He moved to Futa Toro, where he established the Denianke Kingdom. The recapture of the Futa Jallon ended the imperial crisis, leaving a Mali Empire that was cut off from their former vassals on the edge of the Sahara but still a powerful state.

It's around this time, circa 1510/13, that Leo Africanus visited the region and would later give a brief description:

"Mali stretches along a branch of the Niger for a distance of perhaps three hundred miles. It borders on the preceding kingdom in the north, and in the south on a desert with arid mountains. In the west its limits are primitive forests that stretch to the ocean, while in the east it borders the territory of Gao. In this country there is a very large village of nearly six thousand homes, which is called Mali. It is from this village that the whole kingdom takes its name. The king and his court live there. The country has abundant grain, meat and cotton. In this village are a great number of craftsmen and merchants, both local and foreign... The inhabitants are rich on account of their trade, as they furnish Ghana and Timbuktu with many products. They have several temples, priests and professors who teach in the temples, since there are no colleges. They are the most civilized, the most intelligent, and most highly regarded of all the Blacks."

== Second crisis and comeback ==
The Mali Empire once again found itself facing an existential threat in 1534, when Koli Tenguella renewed his assault on Bambuk. The emperor Mahmud III, grandson of Mahmud II, again reached out to the Portuguese for support, and may have secured some help defeating the invasion. The date of Mahmud's death and identity of his immediate successor are not recorded. He may have still been on the throne in 1544 or 1545, (Note: 952 AH) when a Songhai force led by kanfari Dawud sacked the Malian capital (at this point likely Niani) and used the royal palace as a latrine during a brief occupation. The Songhai imposed an onerous peace in 1558, pushing their control westwards to the Sansanding and Segou areas, and now-Askia Dawud married the Mansa's daughter.

Despites these catastrophes, Mali made a comeback in the second half of the 16th century. With expansion northwards blocked by the Songhai and the Denianke, the Mansas turned south and west. Beginning in 1545, a group of Mande warriors invaded and occupied much of the southwestern coast, led by a Mandinka aristocracy and perhaps directly ordered by the Mansa. The Jolof Empire, under pressure from the Denianke for decades, finally fell apart after the 1549 Battle of Danki. Mali stepped back into the power vacuum, reinforcing their control over southern Senegambia and the flourishing Atlantic trade. The Kingdom of Wuli became the principal Malian vassal in the region thanks to its strategic position at the head of navigation on the Gambia River and the presence of the thriving market of Sutuko. On the southern frontier, a Malian force attacked Bighu sometime around 1550, reinforcing the empire's hegemony over the trade routes bringing gold and kola nuts to and from the Akan states and the European trading post at Elmina.

In 1555 André Thevet, based on information he got received from the coast, wrote great praise about the physicians in the empire:

Before proceeding further, I shall mention here something worthy of note: in these two kingdoms, Mely and Tobotu, there are the most learned and experienced physicians in the country, whom they call Bifrains and the Arabs of Africa Mtâeânsm Kttabeb, a proper name taken from one of the most excellent of their predecessors, as if one were to say Galenists or Hippocratists. The common Ethiopian and Abyssinian people call them, in their gibberish, Alkandeil, that is, “men who give light to the sick,” because the word Alkan signifies candle and light, or a lamp. And they are so honoured by both the poor and the rich that, after their King, or Almalcq, and the High Priest, called Albagra, they revere no one but these physicians; being, moreover, the people most fond of rare things in all Africa. Now no living man is permitted to practise this profession without being examined by the elders, who question them according to their books. Their interrogations concern the ailments that may affect each particular member, and especially the head, as the principal one, which they call Algofty or Ttafi; the hair, Achar; the forehead, Algoba; the temples, Algibim; and the ears, Almadem. Having questioned them for a month about the human body, both internally and externally, they proceed to simples, which they generally call Alhaixy, that is, herbs; and the flowers, leaves, roots, fruits, and seeds, Alatmardy, Zloadyo, Zlourochy, Alnoard. Once the candidates have answered the aforementioned Bifrains regarding all these matters, those found competent and capable in their responses are accepted.

By the 1570s Mali had even regained enough strength to roll back some of the Songhai gains in the Niger River valley that had been formalized in the humiliating treaty of 1558.

== Collapse ==
The 1590 Moroccan invasion of the Songhai Empire and their subsequent victory at the Battle of Tondibi completely overturned the political balance of West Africa. The Denianke reacted quickly to the opportunity, taking over the entire Sahel region between the Senegal and Niger rivers and finally ousting Mali from the critical Bambuk region. Cut off from his western provinces and any opportunities to trade with desert-side merchants, Mansa Mahmud IV sought to take advantage of the chaotic environment to capture the critical trade city of Djenne. Unfortunately, his two most powerful supposed vassals, the Sanqara-zuma and the Faran-sura, the commanders of the southern and northern marches respectively, did not march out to support him. Another vassal ruler, Bukar of Kala, professed his support, but secretly went over to the Moroccans when he learned of the others' absence. The Malian and Moroccan armies fought at Jenne on 26 April, the last day of Ramadan, and the Moroccans were victorious thanks to their firearms and Bukar's aid. The Malian army was scattered, but Mahmud was able to escape.

Still, the crushing defeat outside Djenne, combined with the insubordination by his supposed vassals, effectively crippled Mahmud IV's prestige. With Mali weakened and the Arma administration only able to hold the cities, Bambara and Fula war bands marauded through the countryside, eventually sacking Niani and occupying much of Manden. Mahmud IV took refuge in a fortress in the mountains north of Narena, dividing the responsibility of defending the remaining Mali territory between his sons. Upon his death, three of them, Nyamaghan, Mansa Kuru and Mansa Kanda, divided the empire between them. No single Keita ever ruled Manden again.

== Post-Imperial Period ==
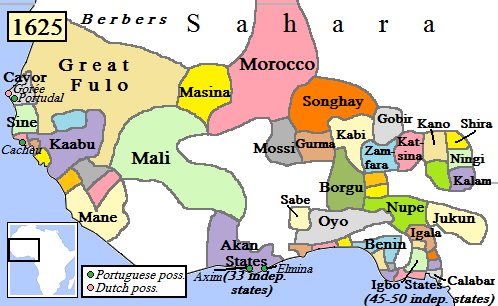
Mali Empire and surrounding states, c. 1625

Reconstructing the chronology and events of the post-imperial period in Manden is difficult, as it is based exclusively on interpreting oral traditions that do not always agree. What is clear is that the region was an arena for competing branches of the Keita dynasty. Kangaba was the capital of the northern sphere, ruled by the descendants of Mansa Kanda. The Joma area, governed from Siguiri, controlled the central region. According to Yves Person, this was the branch descended from Nyamaghan (identical to Delafosse's Mama Maghan) who drove the Fula and Bambara marauders out and, under Fakaba Mansa, re-built Niani circa 1720. Hamana (or Amana), southwest of Joma, became the southern sphere, with its capital at Kouroussa in modern Guinea. Each ruler used the title of mansa, but their authority was limited in scope. The three branches competed for leadership of Mande, warring with each other but generally uniting against outsiders. Kangaba's role is disputed, but it appears to have held a somewhat fragile position of hegemony or preeminence over the other Keita principalities. In the second half of the 17th century Kangaba lost influence over Bamako, and eventually fell under the suzerainty, but not direct control, of the Segou Empire. This fluid political situation would continue into the 19th century, when the Tukolor armies arrived from the west.
