= Komine =

Komine may refer to:

- Komine Castle in Fukushima, Japan
- Kominé, Mali, a village and the seat of the commune of Farakou Massa in the Cercle of Ségou in the Ségou Region of southern-central Mali
- Komine, Montenegro, a village in Pljevlja Municipality in northern Montenegro
- Shane Komine (born 1980), an American former Major League Baseball player
- Takayuki Komine (born 1974), a former Japanese football player
- Acer micranthum, known in Japan as the "Komine maple", a species of Japanese maple
