= Mahmud IV (mansa) =

Last emperor of Mali

Mahmud

Mansa of Mali
- Reign: fl. 1599-1610
- Predecessor: ?
- Successor: Monarchy abolished
- Born: c. 1540; Niani, Guinea
- Died: 1610; Sorokuru
- Dynasty: Keita
- Father: Namagan
- Religion: Islam

Mansa Mahmud Keïta IV, also known as Niani Mansa Mamadou or Soro Mansa Mamadou, was the last reigning emperor of the Mali Empire, according to the Tarikh al-Sudan written in the 17th century. A prominent, if perhaps composite, character in oral traditions, he was responsible for bringing the empire back from its nadir in the 1540s and 50s, but ultimately the defeat outside of the city of Djenne in 1599 brought an end to Mali's imperial period. His death resulted in the splitting of the empire between his sons and marking the end of a unified Mali.

== Context ==
During the mid-16th century, Mali had been weakened by the rise of the Empire of Great Fulo on its western border and the sacking of its capital by the Songhai Empire in 1545.

== Battle of Jenne ==
The 1591 Moroccan invasion of the Songhai Empire opened a massive power vacuum in the Western Sudan. The Empire of Great Fulo quickly took advantage, seizing control of the Sahelian regions from the Senegal River nearly to Massina. They had already established control of the gold-producing region of Bambouk, so this expansion threatened to destroy Mali's access to Trans-Saharan trade as well as the growing Atlantic trade on the Gambia River. In desperate straights, Mansa Mahmud attempted to seize the crucial trade hub of Djenne in 1599. A number of Malian vassals deserted the campaign. Moroccan fusiliers, deployed from Timbuktu, met them in battle, exposing Mali to the same technology (firearms) that had destroyed Songhai. Despite heavy losses, the mansa’s army was not deterred and nearly prevailed; however, the army inside Djenne intervened, forcing Mansa Mahmud Keita IV and his army to retreat. Even in defeat, the treacherous vassals showed deference and respect to the once-mighty Malimansa, but the defeat had destroyed his prestige.

== Last years ==
Between Mali's crippling defeat at Djenne and the destruction of Songhai, insecurity reigned in the Niger River valley. The capital of Niani was soon destroyed by marauding Bambara and Fula raiders, and Mahmud retreated to a fortress on the Sorokuru mountain north of Narena. He divided the responsibility of governing the remaining Mali territory, a triangle stretching approximately from Kita to Bamako to Siguiri, between his sons. Upon his death in 1610, three of them, Nyamaghan, Mansa Kuru and Mansa Kanda, divided the empire between them.

== See also ==
- Mali Empire
- Keita Dynasty

=== Sources ===
- Hunwick, John (1988). Timbuktu & the Songhay Empire: Al-Sa'dis Ta`rikh al-sudan down to 1613 and other Contemporary Documents. Leiden: BRILL. pp. 480 pages. ISBN 90-04-12822-0.
- Person, Yves (1981). "Nyaani Mansa Mamudu et la fin de l 'empire du Mali". Le sol, la parole et l'écrit: Mélanges en hommage à Raymond Mauny, Tome II. Paris: Société française d'histoire d'outre-mer. pp. 613–653.
