= Mahmud II (mansa) =

Mansa of Mali

Mahmud
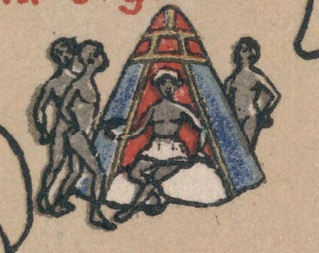
- "Mormelli" from Behaim's Erdapfel in 1492

Mansa of Mali
- Reign: 1490s
- Predecessor: Uli II?
Names
- Mamudu Keita
- Dynasty: Keita
- Father: Uli II
- Religion: Islam

Mansa Mahmud II, also known as Muhammad or Mamadou, was mansa ("king of kings") of the Mali Empire from 1481 to 1496. He was the son, but not necessarily the immediate successor, of Mansa Uli II.

Mansa Mahmud II's rule was characterized by crisis. The rise of Tenguella in the 1480s and 90s put pressure on Mali's western provinces, particularly Futa Jallon that was occupied by Koli Tenguella.

The growing trade in Mali's western provinces with Portugal witnessed the exchange of envoys between the two nations. Mansa Mahmud II received the Portuguese envoy Pedro da Évora in 1484. In the letter he sent back to King John II of Portugal, Mahmud claimed to be exceeded in power by only the sultans of Yemen, Baghdad, Cairo and Takrur.

Meanwhile, the Songhai seized the salt mines of Taghazza in 1493. That same year, Mahmud II sent another envoy to the Portuguese proposing alliance against the Fulas. The Portuguese decided to stay out of the conflict and the talks concluded by 1495 without an alliance.

== See also ==
- Mali Empire
- Keita Dynasty
