= Silatigi =

Historical title in Mande and Fula societies

Silatigi (variant spellings include Satigi, Silati and Solatigi) was a title used in the Mali Empire which survived in several societies in the region, notably the Denianke Kingdom of Futa Toro.

== Etymology ==
In Mande, the term "silatigi" derives from "sili" meaning road, and "tigi" meaning master or leader. Thus the "silatigi" is the one who leads the community in following the right path, physical or spiritual.

== History and Use ==
Silatigi was one of several titles used for provincial governors of the Mali Empire. By the 16th century in what is now Sierra Leone, it had a become a title for royal councillors and judges who assured the interim rule between the death of a king and the election of his successor. It also was used in Kaabu into the 19th century.

The term was borrowed by the Fula of Futa Toro. There, the Silatigi were originally religious leaders privy to the highest secrets of initiation and tasked with performing the rituals necessary to appease the spirits. Beginning with Koli Tenguella, the rulers of the region took Silatigi as their royal title, as did clan leaders in the Sultanate of Massina.

Andreas W. Massing has advance the claim that, the title of the Serer religious priestly class, the 'Saltigue' (the heirs of the ancient Serer lamanes), derives from the Mande term 'Silatigi'. In Serer, Saltigue and its many spelling variations including Saltigi (in Serer) derives from two Serer words: "sal" and "tigui". Sal means "meeting point of two ways, place where one branch branches into two other branches. And by analogy, beam on which the roof of the hut rests." Tigui means "resting the roof of the hut." Combined together, gives its name to "saltigue" (a metaphor). The term also have Serer origins meaning "soothsayer". In Serer society, the term is reserved for those who communicate with the invisible world.

== Notable Silatigis ==
- Tenguella
- Koli Tenguella
