= Mama Maghan =

Post-imperial ruler of Mali

Mansa of Mali
- Reign: early 17th century
- Born: c. 1550
- Nyamaghan Keita
- Dynasty: Keita
- Father: Niani Mansa Mamadou
- Religion: Islam

Mama Maghan, also known as Nyamaghan, was a self-proclaimed Mansa of the Mali Empire in the early 17th century.

== Reign ==
The eldest son of Niani Mansa Mamadou, Nyamaghan was appointed ruler of the city of Kita under his father in order to defend the western part of the crumbling Mali Empire. After his father's death in the early 1600s, the empire split between Nyamaghan and his brothers Mansa Kuru and Mansa Kanda. He marched south to restore imperial control over the Niger River valley, in chaos since Niani Mansa Mamadou's defeat outside Djenne in 1599. There he founded the kafu of Juma. He and his immediate descendants pushed the Fula and Bambara back from the river to Wassoulou, where they formed the Wassoulounke people.

== Historiography ==
Colonial-era historian Maurice Delafosse incorrectly reported that Mama Maghan besieged Segou in 1670, but this was a confusion on his part with a siege in the 1720s by Famagan Ouattara, ruler of the Kong Empire.

== See also ==
- Mali Empire
- Keita Dynasty

=== Sources ===
- Person, Yves (1981). "Nyaani Mansa Mamudu et la fin de l 'empire du Mali". Le sol, la parole et l'écrit: Mélanges en hommage à Raymond Mauny, Tome II. Paris: Société française d'histoire d'outre-mer. pp. 613–653.
