= Tenguella =

Tenguella Ba
- Silatigi
- Reign: 1464–1512
- Successor: Koli Tenguella
- Born: Futa Toro
- Died: 1512; Diarra, Mali
- Religion: Traditional African

Tenguella (also known as Temelá or Tenguella Ba) was a Fula silatigi or chief who founded a short-lived state called Futa Kingui in the upper Senegal River valley, a precursor of the Empire of Great Fulo. He was referred to as the Great Fulo or Great king of the Fulos in Portuguese documents of the time.

== Background and early life ==
The Fula are a West African nomadic people. They had been moving south within the Mali Empire since the thirteenth century. They had generally submitted to the laws of the settled farmers in the region and so had avoided large confrontations. By the end of the 15th Century, they had a strong presence in Futa Tooro, Macina, Fouta Djallon and Bondu.

Tenguella was originally from the western part of Futa Tooro outside the immediate Senegal River valley, an area that was part of the Jolof Empire at the time. He was silatigi of the Yaalalbe clan, both a political and religious leader.

== Reign ==
=== Futa Kingui ===
Tenguella became chief of the Fula around 1464. Pushed by an expansionist Jolof Empire, he led his clan along with several others on a long emigration across the Senegal towards the land of Guidimakha, establishing a state known as Futa Kingui. From this base, Tenguella exerted a powerful attraction to oppressed Fula people in the rest of the region, militarily intervening in a number of areas and disrupting trade. His son Koli went to Futa Jallon to organize the Fula there against Mande domination.

The roots of Tenguella's appeal may have lain partially in religion. Contemporary Muslim sources call him a false prophet, likely referring his syncreticization of Islam with the traditional Fula religion, as represented by his use of the title 'silatigi'. He himself, however, may have seen himself as fully Muslim and even a sort of Mahdi figure, fighting against both paganism and the traditional hierarchies of the region.

=== Conflict with Mali and Songhai ===
Conflict with the Mali Empire started around 1480. Tenguella built up an army which included a strong and effective cavalry force. By 1490 Tenguella's actions in the upper Gambia River basin were threatening the communication lines between the Mali Empire and their western provinces of Kaabu. Koli's attack on the Wuli and Niani from his base in Futa Jallon threatened the Bambuk gold fields. In response, Mansa Mahmud II requested an alliance and firearms from John II of Portugal to fight the Fula. The Portuguese embassy visited the mansa somewhere between 1493 and 1495 but weapons were not forthcoming. They also sent embassies to Tenguella to appease him and safeguard their trade interests.

The rising Songhai Empire were thus confronted by a power that essentially controlled the western gold trade routes and could rival them for the role of successor to Mali. In 1511, after years of mounting tensions, Tenguella invaded the Kingdom of Diarra, the rulers of which called for help from the Songhai. Umar Komajago, a brother of Askia Mohammad I, led a powerful force on a 2 month march through the desert, then in 1512 defeated and killed Tenguella in battle. After this, Diarra likely swore fealty to the Songhai.

== Succession and legacy ==
Tenguella was married to Nana Keita, said in oral histories to be a descendant of Sundiata Keita. At his death, Tenguella was succeeded by his son Koli Tenguella who founded the Denianke Dynasty in Futa Toro.

Historians such as Sirre Abbas Soh have confused some of the accomplishments of Tenguella with those of his son, making the chronology of events difficult to suss out. There was another migration from Futa Tooro at around the same time that went south, crossing the Gambia River, which further exacerbates the confusion.

== Bibliography ==
=== Sources ===
- Kane, Oumar (2004). La première hégémonie peule. Le Fuuta Tooro de Koli Teηella à Almaami Abdul. Paris: Karthala.
- Kane, Oumar (2021). "La Formation du Royaume Jaalalo du Kingi par Tenghella". In Fall, Mamadou; Fall, Rokhaya; Mane, Mamadou (eds.). Bipolarisation du Senegal du XVIe - XVIIe siecle (in French). Dakar: HGS Editions. pp. 42–92.
