= Mane people =

Mandinka invaders who attacked West African coastal societies

The Manes (so called by the Portuguese), Mani or Manneh were invaders who attacked the western coast of Africa in what is now Guinea, Liberia and Sierra Leone throughout much of the sixteenth century.

== Background ==
The widest deployment of political and economic power in the Sudan before the seventeenth century was that stemming from Mandé initiative in the successive empires of Ghana and Mali (and to some extent of Songhai also). This had political consequences in the lands immediately to the west and south of the Mandé heartland around the upper reaches of the Niger and Senegal rivers. One result was the Fulani dispersion eastward past the farthest reaches of Mandé influence, and the other was the settlement of Mandé-speakers along the West Atlantic coast.

Mandé-speakers moved west and south of their homeland as traders and conquerors. In the case of traders, an incentive was probably access to the supplies of salt obtainable from the coast. This move towards the coastlands led to a number of Mandé pioneers carving out kingdoms for themselves in emulation of the major model of Mali. There seem to have been two major axes for the Mandé expansion. One was along the line of the river Gambia, a useful artery for trade, which rises within a few miles of the sources of the Falémé, a major tributary of the Senegal, whose headwaters were in Mande occupation. The other, separated from The Gambia by the Fouta Djallon massif which the Fulani were occupying, ran south into modern Sierra Leone close by the Susu settlement. In both areas, political organizations were established under rulers called farimas. Initially they paid tribute to Mali, and even after the decline of the Mali power in the later fifteenth century, they maintained some idea of its previous supremacy.

== Origins and identity ==
Some early writers suggested that the Mane may have come from as far away as the Kongo or Niger. Recent scholars, however, have shown that they were a Mande people, likely the Mandinka who established themselves in the area around Moussadougou, Guinea in the 16th century.

Mande people had raided the coastal areas for centuries before their large-scale migration during the 16th century. According to the Portuguese trader André Álvares de Almada, they spoke a language closely related that of some of the Mandinka people along the Gambia River, wore the same types of clothes, and used the same weapons. 'Mane' was originally a surname of Bainouk origin; along with the Sane, the Manes were the core of the Nyancho royal aristocracy of the Empire of Kaabu, but their link with the Mane of Moussadougou, if any, is unclear.

The Mane as such were the group of elites who would lead a large-scale migration into the coastal areas. The rank and file were composed of the Sumba and were continually reinforced as conquest progressed.

The Mane used small bows, which enabled them to reuse their enemies' arrows against them, while the enemy could make no use of their short arrows.

The rest of their arms consisted of large shields made of reeds, long enough to give complete cover to the user, two knives, one of which was tied to the left arm, and two quivers for their arrows. Their clothes consisted of loose cotton shirts with wide necks and ample sleeves reaching down to their knees to become tights. One striking feature of their appearance was the abundance of feathers stuck in their shirts and their red caps.

== Expansion ==
While the identification of the Mane is relatively uncontroversial, scholars have produced highly divergent accounts of their invasion(s) of the coastal areas. The central disagreement is whether there was a single Mane invasion that impacted both Liberia and Sierra Leone, or rather waves of invaders who followed different paths over the course of several decades.

=== Single invasion ===
The theory of a single Mane invasion originated with Walter Rodney and was supported by Yves Person. Early Portuguese sources describe a force led by Macarico, a high-ranking woman from the Mali Empire who, having offended the mansa, emigrated with a large following. In the early 1500s she supposedly marched her army south until they reached the Portuguese fort of Elmina. From there they turned west until they arrived in Liberia, where they first appear in the historical record. More likely, however, this army never went to Elmina but simply marched across Liberia from the north.

The Mane fought a major battle against the Bullom people in 1545 near Cape Mount, Liberia where Macarico's son was killed, and she died soon after. The Mane's organization coupled with their auxiliaries reputation for cannibalism and the political fragmentation of the natives enabled them to conquer the entire region within about 15 years. These auxiliaries, called Sumbas, included the Quoja, the Quea, and people speaking Kru languages." The Mane advance was only halted when, in the northwest of what is now Sierra Leone, they came up against the Susu, like themselves a Mandé people, possessing similar weapons, military organization and tactics.

=== Multiple invasions ===
Andrew Massing in 1985 advanced a different interpretation, challenging Rodney's reading of the place names in primary sources. He argued that the major battle against the Bullom happened on or near Sherbro Island, Sierra Leone. The Quoja, rather than being a Kru-speaking part of the Sumbas, led a separate invasion of the Cape Mount region from the east in the 1620s or 30s, eventually coming into conflict with the Mane states, and may have been Mande-speaking (perhaps Vai) themselves. These attacks were only the most recent among Mande incursions, sometimes as small as armed trade caravans, that had begun as early as 1300.

== Aftermath ==
The Mane expansion had a profound impact on the ethnicities and societies of the coast. The Mandé-speaking Mende are almost certainly the descendants of Mane aristocrats mixed with the native Bullom people. Further north, the Loko are also Mandé-speaking, but mixed with the Temne who, themselves speaking a West Atlantic language, have an aristocracy of Mane origin. They brought improved military techniques and iron and cloth manufacture to the region, but the disruption and oppression caused by their invasion helped degrade the thriving stone and ivory carving and raffia weaving traditions among the native communities.

The Mane invasions militarised Sierra Leone. The Sapes had been un-warlike, but after the invasions, right until the late 19th century, bows, shields, and knives of the Mane type had become ubiquitous in Sierra Leone, as had the Mane battle technique of using squadrons of archers fighting in formation, carrying the large-style shields.

== Sources ==
- Massing, Andrew (1985). "The Mane, the Decline of Mali, and Mandinka Expansion towards the South Windward Coast" (PDF). Cahiers d'Études Africaines. 25 (97): 21–55. doi:10.3406/cea.1985.2184.
- Person, Yves (1971). "Review: Ethnic Movements and Acculturation in Upper Guinea since the Fifteenth Century". African Historical Studies. 4 (3): 669–689. doi:10.2307/216536. JSTOR 216536.
- Rodney, Walter (1967). "A Reconsideration of the Mane Invasions of Sierra Leone". The Journal of African History. 8 (2): 219–46. doi:10.1017/S0021853700007039. JSTOR 179481.
