= War Jabi =

War Jaabi

Manna Dynasty
- Reign: 1030 – 1041
- Successor: Lebi ibn War Jabi
- Died: 1041
- Issue: Lebi ibn War Jabi
Names
- War Jaabi bin Rabis
- Religion: Islam

War Jabi (Serer: Waar Jaabi or War Jaabi or War-Dyabe; Arabic: وار ذياب بن ربيس) was the first Muslim king of Takrur in the 1030s, the first to proclaim Islam as a state religion in the Sudan. He introduced sharia law in 1035, which led to the exodus of the Serer people who refused to convert from their traditional Serer religion.

== Background ==
War Jabi was a member of the Manna dynasty that had ruled Takrur since the early 800s. He is the first West African ruler to make Islam the state religion. He is the son and successor of a man named Rabis. Islam had been brought to Takrur by Soninke merchants and spread widely.

== Reign ==
War Jabi converted to Islam and forced his subjects to convert to Islam, introducing sharia law in the Kingdom in 1035. This greatly benefited the state economically and created greater political ties with the Muslim states of North Africa that would be important in the later conflicts with the animist state of Ghana.

He successfully waged West Africa's first Holy War against the King of Sila.

He died in 433 Hijri (1040 or 1041 Gregorian), and was succeeded by his son Lebi ibn War Jabi, who would go on to be a key contributor to the foundation of the Almoravids and their rule in Al Andalus.

=== Serer Exodus ===
War Jabi's enforcement of sharia law pushed the Serer people of Tekrur (land owners and "the local agricultural people"), who refused Islam in favour of their traditional Serer religion, out of the country. That resulted in their migration to Baol and Sine.

== Legacy ==
War Jabi's embrace of Islam may have provided impetus and inspiration for the later Almoravid movement that arose among the Berbers north of the Senegal River in the decades after his death.

The name "War" means to "kill" (or "death") in the Serer language. The old Serer anti-Islamic (and anti-Wolof and anti-Arab) sentiments still prevails amongs ultra conservative Serers, especially in the former Serer Kingdom of Sine–the most conservative of the kingdoms were Serer religion and tradition prevails–even amongst those Serers who converted to Islam, so much that, it is not uncommon to hear Serers use the pejorative terms "the spurns of War" and "the spurns of Leb" in Serer, and in reference to War Jabi and his son Leb–against anyone of Arab decent as well as other Senegambian ethnic groups whom they view as historically helping to propagate Islam in the Senegambia region. Senegalese author Iba Der Thiam writes that: "The Sine is an impregnable bastion of the anti-Islamic."
