= Farakou Massa =

- Commune
- Location in Mali
- Coordinates: 13°39′40″N 5°52′20″W
- Country: Mali
- Region: Ségou Region
- Cercle: Ségou Cercle
- Admin centre (chef-lieu): Kominé

Area
  - Total: 109 km^{2} (42 sq mi)

Population (2009 census)
  - Total: 14,314
  - Density: 131/km^{2} (340/sq mi)
- Time zone: UTC+0 (GMT)

Farakou Massa is a village and rural commune in the Cercle of Ségou in the Ségou Region of Mali. The commune lies along the right bank of the River Niger and includes 8 villages in an area of approximately 109 square kilometers. In the 2009 census it had a population of 14,314. The administrative center (chef-lieu) of the commune is the village of Kominé which is 49 km northeast of Ségou.

Farakou was historically the seat of a minor kingdom, one of 12 making up the province of Kala under the Mali and Songhai Empires. According to legend, the first king was a woman. In 1599 the mansa of Farakou joined the Mali emperor in his disastrous assault on Djenne, the only Kala kingdom to do so besides N'Goa. In 1644 the king of Farakou joined a Arma invasion of the Sultanate of Massina, and the following year was sacked by Bambara marauders.
