= Lebi ibn War Jabi =

Manna Dynasty
- Reign: 1041-??
- Predecessor: War Jabi
- House: Manna Dynasty
- Father: War Jabi
- Religion: Islam

Lebi ibn War Jabi, or Labbi, was the second Muslim ruler of Takrur, and son of War Jabi.

== Background ==
Lebi ibn War Jabi was the son of War Jabi and member of the Manna Dynasty of Takrur. He inherited the throne following his father's death in 1041.

== Reign ==
Following in the steps of his father he continued to promote Islam. He would go on to start an alliance with the newly established Almoravid dynasty, then under Yahya ibn Umar al-Lamtuni, due to religious reasons, and to counter the power of the Ghana Empire. He fought alongside Yahya ibn Umar al-Lamtuni in 1056 at the Battle of Tabfarilla in which the Almoravid ruler would lose his life.

== Expansion ==
Goldmines of the Bambuk region becoming contested and the salt mines of Awlil falling under his control.
