= Takrur =

Historical state in West Africa

- 9th century–1456
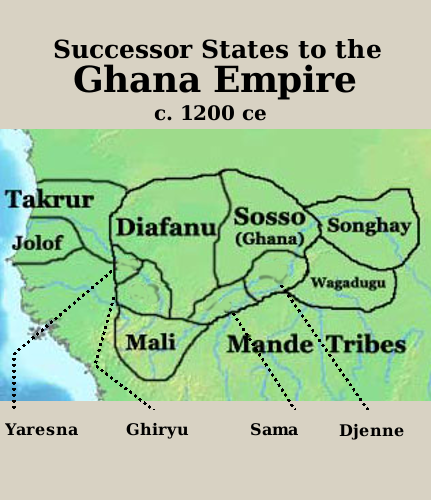
- Capital: Tumbere Jiinge (Dya'ogo, Manna dynasties), Taaga (Laam Taga), Hoorewendu (Laam Termess)
- Common languages: Serer, Fula, Arabic
- Religion: Islam (Official); Serer religion
- Demonyms: Takruri, Takarir
- Government: Monarchy
  - 1030s: War Jabi
- Historical era: Middle Ages
  - Established: 9th century
  - Establishment of Manna dynasty: 9th century
  - Adoption of Islam by War Jabi: 1030s
  - Alliance with the Almoravid Dynasty: c. 1050s
  - Battle of Tabfarilla: 21 March 1056
  - Battle of sagrajas: 1086
  - Conquered and vassalized by Mali Empire: c. 1285
  - Conquered by Jolof Empire: 1456
Succeeded by
Jolof Empire; Denianke Kingdom

Takrur, Tekrur, or Tekrour (c. 500 – c. 1456) was a state based in the Senegal River in modern-day Senegal which was at its height in the 11th and 12th centuries, roughly parallel to the Ghana Empire. It lasted in some form into the 18th century.

== History ==
=== Origin ===
There are a number of conflicting theories about the deep past of the Senegal River valley, where the Kingdom of Takrur would take root. The formation of the state may have taken place as an influx of Fulani from the east settled in the Senegal valley. John Donnelly Fage suggests that Takrur was formed through the interaction of Berbers from the Sahara and "agricultural peoples" who were "essentially Serer". The outsiders may, however, have been Soninke rather than Berber, and the native population may have already spoken Fula. Regardless, the region has been an ethnic melting pot from the earliest traceable periods up to the present, although Fula have come to dominate in more recent centuries.

Historian Andrew Clark writes that the state may have been founded as early as 100 CE. The founding dynasty was called Dya'ogo. Traditional historians disagree on their origin and ethnic background (assuming a relationship can be drawn at all with ethnic labels as understood today). They were blacksmith-kings, and supposedly introduced iron-working and ore extraction to the region. This founding dynasty was eventually overthrown by the Tonjon dynasty sometime during the 8th century.

=== Manna dynasty ===
A Soninke clan under Mamadu Sumaare, originally from Wagadu, conquered Takrur in the 9th or 10th century, establishing the Manna dynasty and gradually melding into the local culture. They may have been Nyakhates from Diarra, Soumares from Guidimakha, or Jaabis.

Takrur was first mentioned in Arab sources in the 9th century under the name "Zaghi b. Zaghi." In 1035 king War Jabi introduced Sharia law, becoming the first ruler to officially adopt Islamic orthodoxy in the Sahel. During his reign he launched a Holy War against the King of Silla, subjugating them and converting the people to Islam.

He died around 1040-1041 and was succeeded by his son, Lebi ibn War Jabi, who would go on to start an alliance with the newly established Almoravid Dynasty to counter the power of the Ghana Empire. Having fought alongside Yahya ibn Umar al-Lamtuni at the battle of Tabfarilla, Lebi may have provided more military help and financial aid to the Almoravids, helping conquer up to Morocco and Al-Andalus. 4,000 black cavalrymen, of possible Takruri origin, were crucial to the Almoravid victory at the 1086 Battle of Sagrajas in Al-Andalus. This alliance was maintained for most of the next 200 years.

During this period Takrur held a dominant position in regional trade, controlling a series of trading posts and cities linking the salt mines of Awlil on the coast north of the mouth of the Senegal to the interior. Its ruler during this time is praised for his strength and justice. In the 12th century, Silla, a vassal of Takrur, went to war against Wagadu. Its decline meant that Takrur was able to exert more control over the trade routes moving gold from Bambouk to desert-side markets.

=== Serer Exodus ===
"Today, the Serer retain much of their old culture, customs and traditions. In fact, it's not uncommon to hear how Serer culture has survived through the centuries in spite of all the forces which tried to destroy it."

— Godfrey Mwakikagile,

When Islam and Sharia was introduced to the Kingdom by War Jabi, it led to the persecution of the local Serers. The lamanic class, whose role also included the safeguarding of their traditional Serer spirituality, are believed to have been at the forefront of resisting Islamization, partly to preserve their religion, but also their power and wealth as landowners. It was common for early Arab writers such as Al Bakri to refer to "non-believers" of Islam in their works as lamlam, lemlem, or damdam which may be a corruption of the Serer title lamaan. The persecution of the Serers in the 11th century led to their first generally accepted exodus from Tekrur, moving southwards.

During the 13th century, a civil war broke out. The descendants of the Serers who chose to remain decided to migrate southwest, first to the Ferlo, and then to Siin and Saloum rather than be converted to Islam. Ibrahima Thiaw advanced the claim that this was the process by which a distinct 'Serer' identity first emerged, separate from the rest of the Takruri population. Professor Issa Laye Thiaw, Professor Cheikh Anta Diop, the 18th century French archaeologist Paul Pierret, and Professor Molefi Kete Asante et al... amongst other historians posits that the name 'Serer' is sacred and pre-Islamic, leading Asante et al. to conclude that, "they are an ancient people whose history reaches deep into the past..." and that would be consistent with their "strong connection to their ancient religious past".

Professor Trimingham notes that, in the region, Takrur became the first to adopt Islam, but in so doing, completely lost its Serer identity.

=== Vassalage and decline ===
The 13th century was a period of political crisis in Takrur. The last Manna king, Cengaan Sumaare, is remembered as a bloodthirsty tyrant who was overthrown by his own people. The western parts of the kingdom became independent. Around 1286, the Mali Empire conquered Takrur and put it under a military dictatorship ruled by farba (governors), remembered locally as the Tonjon dynasty. Mali's power in the region diminished in the 14th century, however, and the Fula Lam Termess and Lam Taaga dynasties were able to take power. The region may also have been controlled by the Kingdom of Diarra.

Takrur was conquered by the Jolof emperor Tyukuli N'Diklam in the 15th century, who split the region between multiple farba. By 1506, however, the Burba's authority was weakening, and the farba fell to fighting amongst themselves. Koli Tengella, a Fula warlord native to Takrur but coming from Futa Jallon, conquered the area in 1521 and set up the Denanke dynasty. This would last until 1776 when the Fouta Revolution, led by Muslim clerics, took over the kingdom and the house of Denanke was brought down.

=== Timeline ===
Dates are approximate and often disputed by different sources or authors.

Time	Events
6-9th centuries	Dya-ogo dynasty
9-11th centuries	Soninke Manna dynasty
1030s	Takrur converted to Islam under War Jabi
1030–1035	Serers defeated by the Muslims leading to their first exodus.
1086	Battle of Sagrajas
Nov 1087	Serers led by Amar Godomat defeated Almoravid leader Abu Bakr ibn Umar, killing him at the Battle of Khoo mak (commonly known as Lake Cayor)
c. 1286	Mali conquest of Takrur
1456–1506	Jolof rule of Takrur
1506–1526	Civil war between farbas
1520–1521	Invasion by Koli Tenguella
1526	Koli Tenguella establishes firm control over Takrur, founds the Denanke Kingdom

== Economy ==
Takrur was a trading centre, where gold from the Bambuk region, salt from the Awlil, and Sahel grain were exchanged for wool, copper, beads, and jewelry. The kingdom's cotton cloth was among its most renowned exports.

== Territory ==
At its height in the medieval period, Takrur was a major polity of the Middle Senegal Valley. In the twelfth century, al-Idrīsī describes Takrur as the dominant polity of the region, with Silla, on the northern bank of the Senegal, among the states belonging to its ruler. He also describes Barisa as a smaller commercial settlement dependent upon Takrūr.

The political and settlement core of early Takrur lay in the Middle Senegal Valley floodplain, particularly in the area of the Île à Morphil. Archaeological research in the valley identifies the Île à Morphil as lying within the broad area historically attributed to the early polity of Takrur, while the capital of Takrūr is described as having been situated in the Middle Senegal Valley floodplain. The region underwent a major transformation in settlement scale and complexity between the ninth and eleventh centuries, contemporaneous with the emergence of Takrūr and Silla.

The precise territorial extent of medieval Takrur remains uncertain. Ibn Saʿīd states that the territory of the Maqzāra, the population associated with Takrūr in his account, lay predominantly north of the Senegal, with only a smaller portion south of the river, where most of the land belonged to the Lamlam. Takrūr itself, however, extended across the river: its capital was situated on both banks of the Senegal.

The northern limits of the medieval kingdom cannot be established with the same certainty. Oumar Kane's description of territory extending toward the Assaba, southern Tagant and Aleg concerns the later geographical and political history of Fuuta Tooro, particularly its period of expansion under the later Fulɓe dynasties, rather than providing a securely documented maximum frontier for medieval Takrūr. Kane distinguishes this later Fuuta Tooro from ancient Takrūr, whose “cradle” he places in the Senegal valley between Dagana and Dembankani.

They also controlled, or at least had significant influence over, the area downstream that would become Waalo.

The Gorgol River valley was the heartland of the kingdom, and was the site of the Dya'ogo capital Tumbere Jiinge.

== Takrur as a toponym ==
Takruri was a term, like Bilad el-Sudan, that was used to refer to all people of West African ancestry, and is still in use as such in the Middle East, with some corruption, as in Takruni, pl. Takarna تكروني in Saudi Arabia, and in Ethiopia and Eritrea, in the form Tukrir. The district of Bulaq Al-Dakrur بولاق الدكرور in Cairo is named after an ascetic from West Africa. In the Middle East Toucouleurs are still referred to as Tukrir to this day which was historically also a term among Habesha people for the west African population living along the modern Sudanese border.

Takrur was the term used by the region's inhabitants up until the 15th century. During the 16th and 17th centuries, however, it was gradually replaced by Futa Toro.

== See also ==
- Serer people
- Fula people
- Toucouleur people
- Serer ancient history
- States headed by Serer Lamanes
- Timeline of Serer history

== Sources ==
- Ba, Abdourahmane (2017). "Chapitre 1, Le Takrur Historique Et l'Héritage Du Fuuta Tooro". In Villasante Cervello, Mariella; Taylor, Raymond (eds.). Histoire et politique dans la vallée du fleuve Sénégal: Mauritanie. Hiérarchies, échanges, colonisation et violences politiques, VIIIe-XXIe siècle (in French). Harmattan. pp. 96–161.
- Boulegue, Jean (2013). Les royaumes wolof dans l'espace sénégambien (XIIIe-XVIIIe siècle) (in French). Paris: Karthala Editions.
- Brooks, George E. (August 1985). "Western African to c. 1860 A.D.: a Provisional Historical Schema based on Climate Periods". Indiana University African Studies Program.
- Kane, Oumar (2004). La première hégémonie peule. Le Fuuta Tooro de Koli Teηella à Almaami Abdul. Paris: Karthala.
- Thiaw, Ibrahima (2013). "From the Senegal River to Siin: The Archaeology of Sereer Migrations in North-Western Senegambia.". In Bosma, Ulbe; Kessler, Gijs; Lucassen, Leo (eds.). Migration and Membership Regimes in Global and Historical Perspective: An Introduction Studies in Global Migration History. Brill. ISBN 978-9004241831.
- Smidt, Wolbert (2010). "Tukrir". In Siegbert Uhlig, Alessandro Bausi (ed.). Encyclopedia Aethiopica. Vol. 4. Harrassowitz. pp. 998–1, 000. ISBN 9783447062466.
- al-Naqar, Umar (1969). "Takrur the History of a Name. Cambridge University Press. pp. 367
- Levtsiyon, Neḥemyah; Levtsiyon, Neḥemyah (1973). Ancient Ghana and Mali. Studies in African history (1. publ ed.). London: Methuen. p. 44. ISBN 978-0-416-75830-6.
- McDougall, EA (1985). The View from Awdaghust: War, Trade and Social Change in the Southwestern Sahara, from the Eighth to the Fifteenth Century. Cambridge University Press. p. 8.
- Hrbek, Ivan; Unesco, eds. (1992). Africa from the Seventh to the Eleventh Century. General history of Africa (Vol. 3 ed.). London : Berkeley, Calif., U.S.A. : Paris: J. Currey; University of California Press; UNESCO. p. 356. ISBN 978-0-85255-093-9.
- Mwakikagile, Godfrey, "Ethnic Diversity and Integration in The Gambia: The Land, The People and The Culture," (2010), pp. 11, 224, 231, ISBN 9987932223
- Mwakikagile, Godfrey, The Gambia and Its People: Ethnic Identities and Cultural Integration in Africa. (2010), p. 138, ISBN 9789987160235
- Chavane, Bruno A., "Villages de l’ancien Tekrour", Vol. 2, Hommes et sociétés. Archéologies africaines, KARTHALA Editions (1985), p. 38, ISBN 2-86537-143-3
- Klein, Martin A., "Islam and Imperialism in Senegal Sine-Saloum, 1847-1914", Edinburgh University Press (1968), pp 7 & 63, ISBN 0-85224-029-5
- Gravrand, Henry, "La Civilisation sereer, Cossan – les origines", vol. 1, Nouvelles Editions africaines (1983), pp 115–18, ISBN 2-7236-0877-8
- Gravrand, Henry, "La civilisation Sereer, Pangool", Nouvelles Editions africaines du Sénégal (1990), p. 13, ISBN 2-7236-1055-1
- Thiaw, Issa Laye, La Religiosité des Sereer, avant et pendant leur Islamisation. Éthiopiques, No: 54, Revue Semestrielle de Culture Négro-Africaine. Nouvelle Série, Volume 7, 2e Semestre (1991).
- Pierret, Paul, "Dictionnaire d'archéologie égyptienne", Imprimerie nationale 1875, p. 198-199
- Pierret, Paul, "Dictionnaire d'archéologie égyptienne", Imprimerie nationale 1875, p. 198-199 [in] Diop, Cheikh Anta, Precolonial Black Africa., (translated by Harold Salemson), Chicago Review Press (1988), p. 65
- Asante, Molefi Kete; Mazama, Ama; Encyclopedia of African Religion, SAGE Publications (2008) ISBN 9781506317861 (retrieved 2 March 2025)
- Trimingham, John Spencer, A history of Islam in West Africa, pp. 174, 176 & 234, Oxford University Press, USA (1970)
