= Kominé, Mali =

Kominé
- Village
- Location in Mali
- Coordinates: 13°39′40″N 5°52′19″W
- Country: Mali
- Region: Ségou Region
- Cercle: Ségou Cercle
- Commune: Farakou Massa
- Time zone: UTC+0 (GMT)

Kominé is a village and seat of the commune of Farakou Massa in the Cercle of Ségou in the Ségou Region of southern-central Mali. It lies on the Niger River 50 km northeast of Ségou.
