= Uli II =

15th century Mansa of Mali

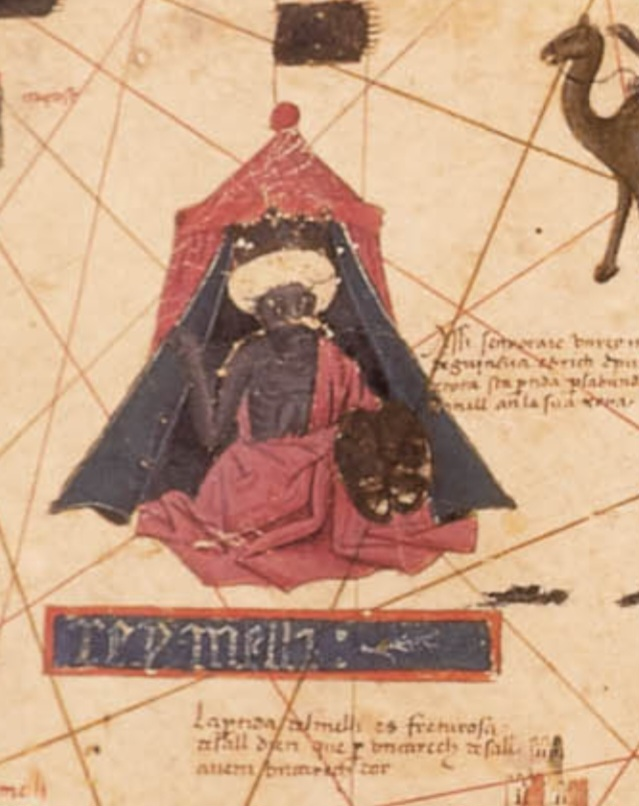
- Drawing of "Rey Melli" around 1450-1460, from the Estense World Map

Mansa of Mali
- Reign: c. 1460 – c. 1480/81
- Predecessor: Musa III
- Successor: Mahmud II?
- Dynasty: Keita
- Religion: Islam

Mansa Uli II (French: "Oualy II"), also known as Gbèré, was a mansa ("king of kings") of the Mali Empire. He ruled during the second half of the 15th century.

According to the oral traditions preserved in Dioma, Gbèré was the younger of two brothers from Niani who liberated Dioma from a Fula invasion. Gbèré is a Mandinka name meaning "red" in reference to one's skin tone. After this success, his brother was crowned mansa. Gbèré ascended to the throne under the royal name Uli II following his brother Musa III's death. Other sources claim that Musa was his father. Uli was in turn succeeded, perhaps not directly, by his son Mahmud II.

== See also ==
- Mali Empire
- Keita Dynasty
