= Chemama =

Region on the bank of the Senegal River in Mauritania

Chemama is the name of the region along the Northern bank of the Senegal River, in Mauritania: a fertile band of land extending sixteen to thirty-two kilometers north of the river and containing alluvial soil. It is the only agricultural region in the country.

The Chemama region has a rainy season that stretches from May to September. The region's average annual precipitation ranges from 300 to 600 mm (12 to 24 inches) per year.

The population in this region is a potentially volatile mixture of ethnic Maures from the Mauritanian heartland and of Black African peoples linked to the nations to the south. The cities of Rosso and Kaedi are among the largest settlements.

During the colonial era, there would be periodic raids by Maures on the towns of the region. The region became the center of ethnic conflict once again during the late 1980s, with significant displacement of the black population into neighboring Senegal in 1989.
