= Senegal River basin =

River basin in West Africa

Senegal River Basin
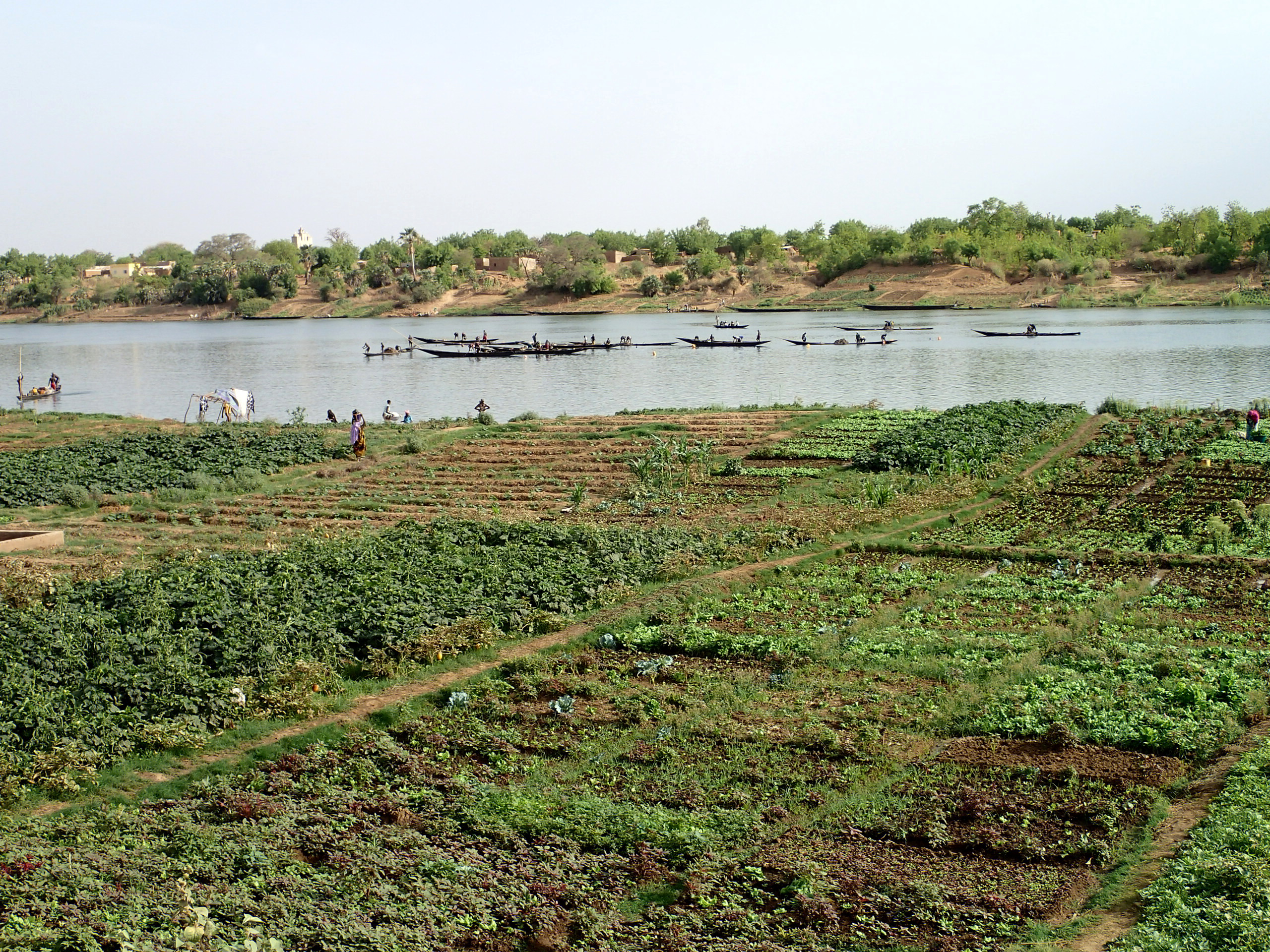

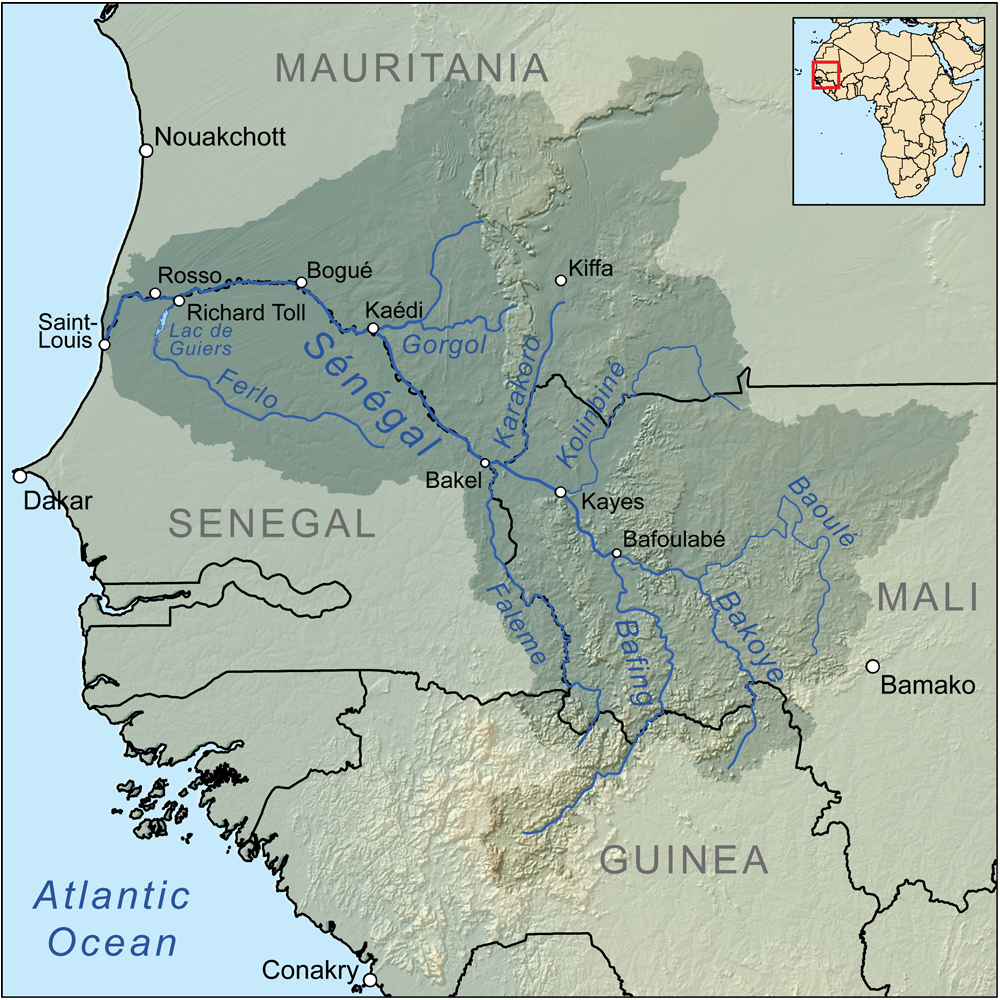

Physical characteristics
- Basin size: 444,000 square kilometers
- Discharge
  - average: 20 cubic kilometers

Basin features
- Population: 9,380,000

Senegal River Basin spans approximately 300,000 square kilometers across Guinea, Mali, Mauritania, and Senegal. Flowing 1,800 kilometers from the Fouta Djallon highlands to the Atlantic Ocean at Saint-Louis, it supports over 2 million people. Jointly managed by the OMVS, it provides critical hydroelectricity, agriculture, and flood control

== Geologic history ==
The Senegal Basin has an expansive stratigraphic and depositional history dating as far back as the Permo-Triassic with the start of rifting sequences of the continental crust of what was western Africa. Being one of the most geologically significant units of West Africa, this Mesozoic-Cenozoic aged basin is a good index for the overall structure of the Senegal Continental Margin.

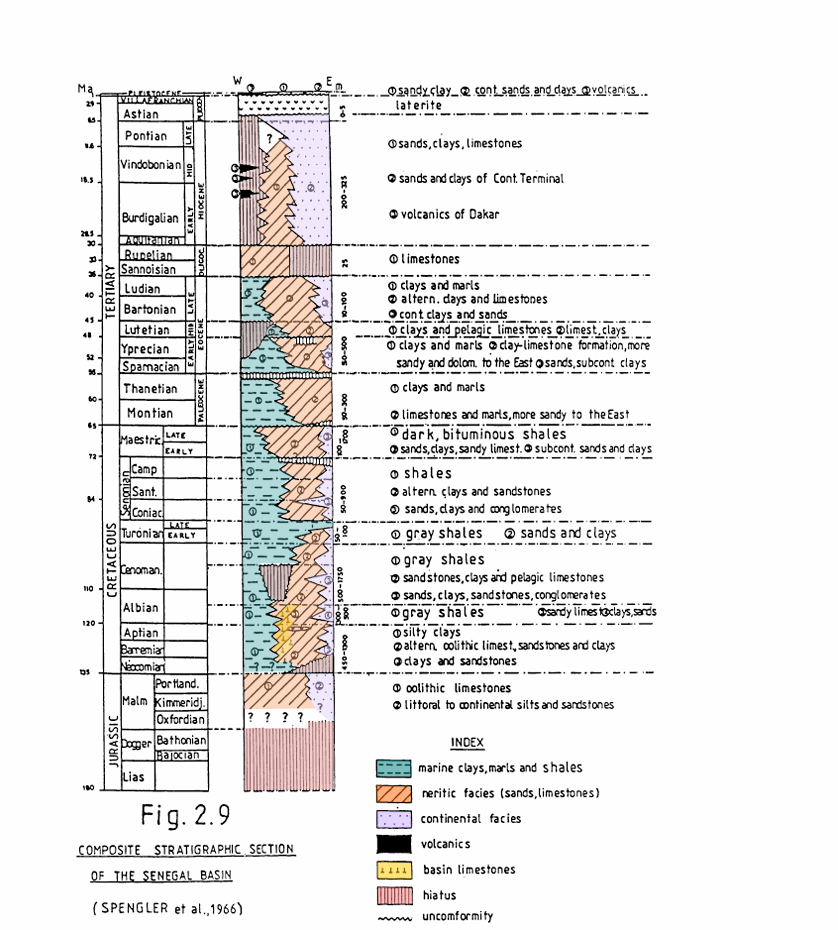
Composite stratigraphic section of Senegal Basin

=== Triassic ===
Salt domes of the Casamance region are tentatively aged to the period. Rifting of west Africa's continental crust laid the foundation for future stratigraphic development.

=== Jurassic ===
Sedimentary processes of the Senegalese Basin become more rapid during the turn of the Jurassic. Most notably is rapid subsidence of the western basin. This brought forth an array of intense geologic processes such as faulting, folding, volcanic activity across Mesozoic Africa. During this period, the deposition of limestones and continental to littoral silts and sandstones broke the depositional hiatus of the Triassic.

=== Cretaceous ===
The Cretaceous exhibits the largest accumulation of sediments in the Senegal Basin. Especially when compared to other periods in the Mesozoic. The rapid subsidence of the Jurassic slowed at the start of the Early Cretaceous. Limestones, Calcarenites and clays were deposited within the inner shelf environment developed at the time.

During Late Cretaceous, plenty of epicontinental deposition is seen throughout. A long and consistent deposition of Shales is observed when referring to the stratigraphic column. During which, subsidence had reached its maximum with the spreading of continental sands and clays during the Maastrichtian.

=== Cenozoic ===
During the Paleocene, basin subsidence halted. Deposition of the coastal marls were deposited onto present oolitic limestones. New regression periods and neritic conditions prevailed during the Eocene. Basin uplift via epeirogenic movements occurred in the Oligocene.

== Petrology and morphology ==
The Senegal basin is influenced by multiple transform faults with a weak Paleozoic basement that has undergone rifting, transitional, and drifting. which was cased by the formation of distinct depositional sequences, syn-rift, sag, and continental margin sequences. The Triassic-Early Jurassic rifting stage that mostly formed fluvial, lacustrine, and deltaic deposits in syn-rift sequences.

== Economics ==
The Senegal basin contains 34 oil and gas fields bast of discovery's in the area the estimated amounts are 1.27 billion bbl for oil and 55.1 tcf for gas which is equal to 10.451 billion barrels of oil significant deposits are located in the deep water area of the Senegal basin.

== Hydrology ==
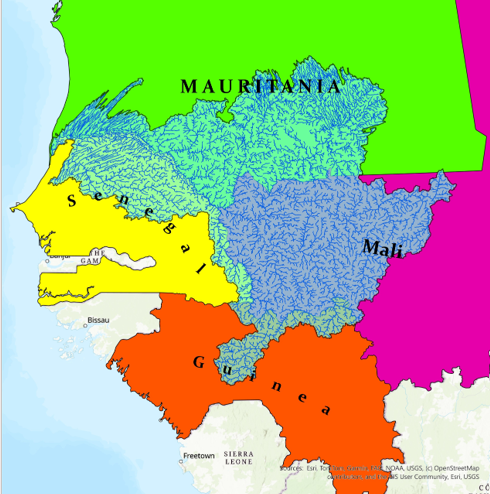
Full extent of the Senegal River Basin outlined in blue. Major and Minor rivers as dark blue lines. Nations with territory within the basin highlighted.

The Senegal River Basin's primary river is the Senegal River, with the Bafing River, Bakoy River and Falémé River acting as primary tributaries to the basin. 80% of the rivers flow originates from these tributaries, all of which are sourced in the Fouta Djallon mountains in Guinea. The Gorgol River, Karakoro River, Kolinbiné River, Baoulé River, and Ferlo River are other major rivers in the basin. By the time the tributaries reach the border point between Mali, Senegal, and Mauritania they all form into the Senegal River, with an annual discharge around 20km^{3} at Bakel, Senegal.

Average precipitation over the Senegal River Basin watershed is 519mm/year, receiving most of the water from rainfall. The wet season exists between May and October, with average annual rainfall peaking in August at 160mm/year. Annual average Evapotranspiration is estimated to be 384mm/year, peaking in September with an estimate average of 72.3mm/year

Due to the higher rate of evaporation, as well as the arid conditions in the basin, and increased irrigation practices since the signing of the Organisation pour la mise en valeur du fleuve Sénégal the mouth of the basin has seen a substantial shift in surface and aquifer chemistry. A shallow (2m) saline aquifer existing just below the Senegal River Delta which was predominantly influenced by ocean water salinity has shown evolutions toward evaporite origins
