= Musa III of Mali =

Musa

Mansa of Mali
- Predecessor: Maghan III?
- Successor: Ouali II?

Mansa Musa III, also known as Foamed Musa or Sérébandjougou, was a mansa (emperor) of the Mali Empire, probably ruling in the second quarter of the 15th century.

Little is known about him or his reign. He first enters recorded history during the empire's war against the Fula Wassoulounké in the 1440s. He and his younger brother liberated the newly settled area of Dioma, and Sérébandjougou was crowned mansa shortly after. He was succeeded, perhaps immediately or with other kings in between, by his son or brother Ouali II.

== See also ==
- Mali Empire
- Keita Dynasty
