= Empire of Great Fulo =

Former Pulaar kingdom of Senegal

Coordinates: 22°N 11°W

Empire of Great Fulo Deeniyankobe
- 1512–1776
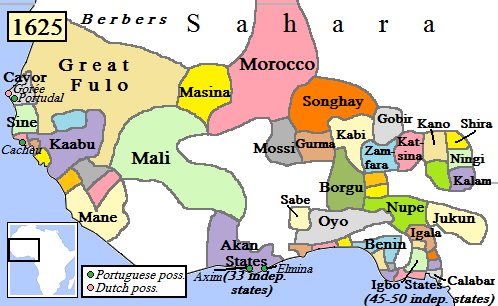
- Capital: Tumbere-Jiinde
- Common languages: Fula
- Religion: Traditional African religion
- Government: Monarchy
- Silatigi or Satigi
  - 1512-1537: Koli Tenguella
- Legislature: Batu Fuuta (assembly of nobles)
- Historical era: Early Modern Period
  - Tenguella establishes Fuuta Kingi: 1464
  - Defeat of Tenguella at the hands of the Songhai, accession of Koli: 1512
  - Islamic revolution, fall of the dynasty: 1776
Preceded by	Succeeded by
Mali Empire; Fuuta Kingi	Almamyate of Futa Toro

The Empire of Great Fulo (Fula: Deeniyankobe; French: Grand Fulo), also known as the Denanke Kingdom or Denianke Kingdom, was a Pulaar kingdom of Senegal, which dominated the Futa Toro region from the early 16th century to 1776.

Tenguella, a Fula chief in Futa Toro, led an emigration in the 1450s to establish the Futa Kingi state. His actions disrupted trade, which threatened Mali's communication lines, and led to conflict with Songhai. In 1512, Amar Konjago of the Songhai defeated Tenguella, ending his state. Tenguella's son, Koli, led further migrations, and redirected military efforts against the Jolof Empire, hastening its collapse. After Koli's reign, the Denianke dynasty ruled a large empire but later on succession struggles, foreign intervention, and instability followed. In 1776, Sulayman Bal led a revolution, overthrowing the dynasty and establishing the Imamate of Futa Toro.

== Etymology ==
The Deniaankobe were the clan of Koli Tenguella. There are a variety of theories for the origin of the name either citing illustrious ancestors named Denia or Deeny or, more likely, Dena, the place where Koli's forces had settled in Futa Jallon before conquering Futa Toro.

Great Fulo is the term given to the kingdom and its leader by the Portuguese.

== History ==
=== Tenguella (1464–1512) ===
Tenguella was a Fula silatigi, a religious leader and political chief, in Futa Toro. Pushed by an expansionist Jolof Empire, in the 1450s he led an emigration eastwards, establishing a state known as Futa Kingi in the lands of the Kingdom of Diarra. From this base, Tenguella militarily intervened in a number of neighboring areas and disrupted trade. His son Koli went to Futa Jallon to organize the Fula there against Mande domination.

By 1490 Tenguella's actions in the upper Gambia River basin were threatening the communication lines between the Mali Empire and their western provinces of Kaabu as well as the Bambuk gold fields. In 1511, after years of mounting tensions, Tenguella invaded the Kingdom of Diarra, the rulers of which called for help from the Songhai. Amar Konjago, a brother of Askia Mohammad I, in 1512 defeated and killed Tenguella in battle and destroyed his young state.

=== Koli Tenguella (1512–1537) ===
Koli Tenguella led another armed migration north from his base in Futa Jallon, attacking many small states on his path. After re-establishing his family's rule in Futa Toro, he redirected the fledgling state's military away from Songhai towards the Jolof Empire with great success. The growth of the Denianke empire would hasten the breakup of the Jolof state into several warring kingdoms. He established a fixed capital in Tumbere-Jiinde in what is today Senegal's Futa Toro region and reconquered Kingi. Koli died in 1537 during a war against the kingdom of Bussa.

=== Apex ===
Koli was succeeded by his brother Labba Tenguella, beginning the Denianke dynasty (or Denyanke). After the 1549 collapse of the Jolof Empire at the Battle of Danki, the Denianke took advantage. By the end of the 16th century, they were receiving regular tribute from the Kingdom of Jolof, Waalo, Gajaaga, Diarra, Diakhaba, Saloum, Goundiourou, Namandirou and the Lamtuna, and possibly Khasso as well. The Futa Djallon, the gold-producing Bambouk region, and the Wagadu and Taga regions east of the Senegal River also fell under Denianke hegemony. In the early 17th century, the Fula added Cayor to their roster of tributaries.

The apex of Denianke power came under Satigi Samba Lamu, when they controlled both the mouth of the Senegal and many of the trans-Saharan trade routes. However the power of the ruler was never absolute, and the satigi's rule over the massive empire amassed in the last decades of the 16th century was increasingly tenuous and nominal by the middle of the 17th century.

=== Religious conflict and end ===
The Denianke ruled animist monarchs over an increasingly Muslim populace. The Torodbe became increasingly influential, opposing Denianke leadership and calling for jihads against neighboring animist Mandinka states. The reign of Silatigi Siree Sawa Laamu (r.1669-1702) saw the outbreak of the Char Bouba war, an Islamist uprising against traditionalist monarchies in the Senegal river valley that sparked a civil war among the Deniankes.

Futa Toro had no defined rules of succession for the satigi, leading to regular power struggles and civil wars. Beginning in the early 18th century, the Trarza Moors, supported by the sultan of Morocco Moulay Ismail, attempted to exert control over the north bank of the Senegal and the lucrative trade in gum arabic. The French in Saint-Louis attempted the same, and instability and foreign intervention became endemic in Futa Toro and much of the Senegal River valley. The well-known ceddo war chief Samba Gelaajo Jeegi took power with the backing of both major powers in 1725, but was unable to break free of their influence and was driven out in 1731. Satigis succeeded each other with bewildering speed for the next few decades with the Moors holding the real power.

The dynasty was overthrown in a revolution led by Sulayman Bal in 1776. He stepped down once the holy war was won and was replaced by Abdul Qadir ibn Hammadi, the first almamy of the Imamate of Futa Toro.

== Government ==
The silatigi was generally the oldest male of Tenguella's line, but inheritance had to be approved by the batu Fuuta, an assembly of nobles, which also functioned as a constitutional council, ensuring the smooth transition of power to the most competent candidates.

Another batu was a sort of cabinet composed of members of the royal household, who each held specific dossiers such as tax collection and management of the royal estate. The heir presumptive or kamalenku, for example, administered the right bank of the Senegal, including the Moors who lived there. Royal control was loose and administration was decentralized, with revenues shared between the satigi and the provincial governors.

The king with his large herds of horses was highly mobile. Thus the capital, to the extent that there was one, moved frequently.

== Economy ==
Futa Tooro benefited from extensive trade networks, with horses and donkeys moving south from the pasturelands of the Sahel; kola nuts, iron, and slaves moving north from Kaabu; gold from Bambuk and the Soninke kingdom of Gajaaga as well as cloth moving west; and salt, and European products coming east from the coast. The kingdom's main exports were gold and hides. Palm products and beeswax were also important early trade goods. In the 17th century French, English, and Dutch traders entered the market looking to purchase gold and ivory as well as slaves.

== List of Rulers ==
- Koli Tengella (1512-37)
- Labba Tengella (1537-65)
- Samba Tengella (Samba Laamu) (1565-67)
- Gelaajo Bambi (1567 - 71)
- Gelaajo Tabaara (1571 - 81)
- Yéro Koli (Yéro Jam) (1581-91)
- Gata Yéro Koli (1591-1602)
- Sawa Laamu (1603-40)
- Bubakar Sawa Laamu (1640 - 69)
- Siré Saawa Laamu (1669 - 1702)
- Sabboyi Sawa Laamu (1702 - 07)
- Sawa Dondé (1707 - 09)
- Bubakar Sïré (1709-10; 1718 - 23)
- Gelaajo Jegi (1710 - 18)
- Bubu Musa (1721;1723-24; 1730-33)
- Samba Siré (1724 - 25)
- Samba Gelaajo Jeegi (1724-30; 1731-32; 1740-42)
- Konko Bubu Musa (1732-40; 1742-45)
- Sule Njaay (1745-47; 1749-51; 1753-75)
- Bubu Gayssiri (1747 - 49)
- Jaaye Hola (1751 -53)
- Sule Bubu Gayssiri (177S - c. 1778)

== See also ==
- Takrur
- Imamate of Futa Toro
- Imamate of Futa Jallon
- Military history of the Mali Empire
- Jolof Empire
- History of Senegal
