= Futa Tooro =

Semidesert region in Senegal and Mauritania

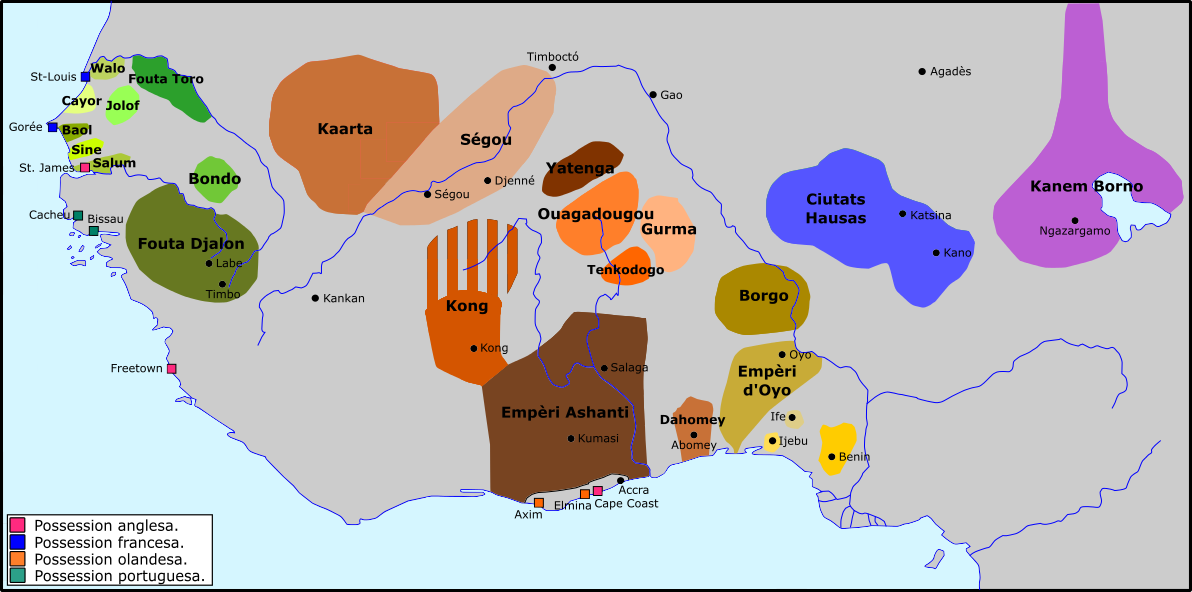
Futa Toro and West African kingdoms, c. 18th century.

Futa Toro (Wolof and Fula: Fuuta Tooro, فُوتَ تࣷورࣷ, 𞤆𞤵𞥄𞤼𞤢 𞤚𞤮𞥄𞤪𞤮; Arabic: فوتا تورو), often simply the Futa, is a semidesert region around the middle run of the Senegal River. This region, which is located in Senegal, is historically significant as the center of several Fulani states, and a source of jihad armies and migrants to the Fouta Djallon.

The word Futa is a general name the Fulbe gave to any area they lived in, while Toro was the actual identity of the region for its inhabitants, likely derived from the ancient kingdom of Takrur. The people of the area mostly speak Pulaar, a dialect of the Fula language that spans West Africa from Senegal to Cameroon. They identified themselves by the language giving rise to the name Haalpulaar'en meaning those who speak Pulaar. The Haalpulaar'en are also known as Toucouleurs (var. Tukolor), a name also derived from of Takrur.

== Geography ==
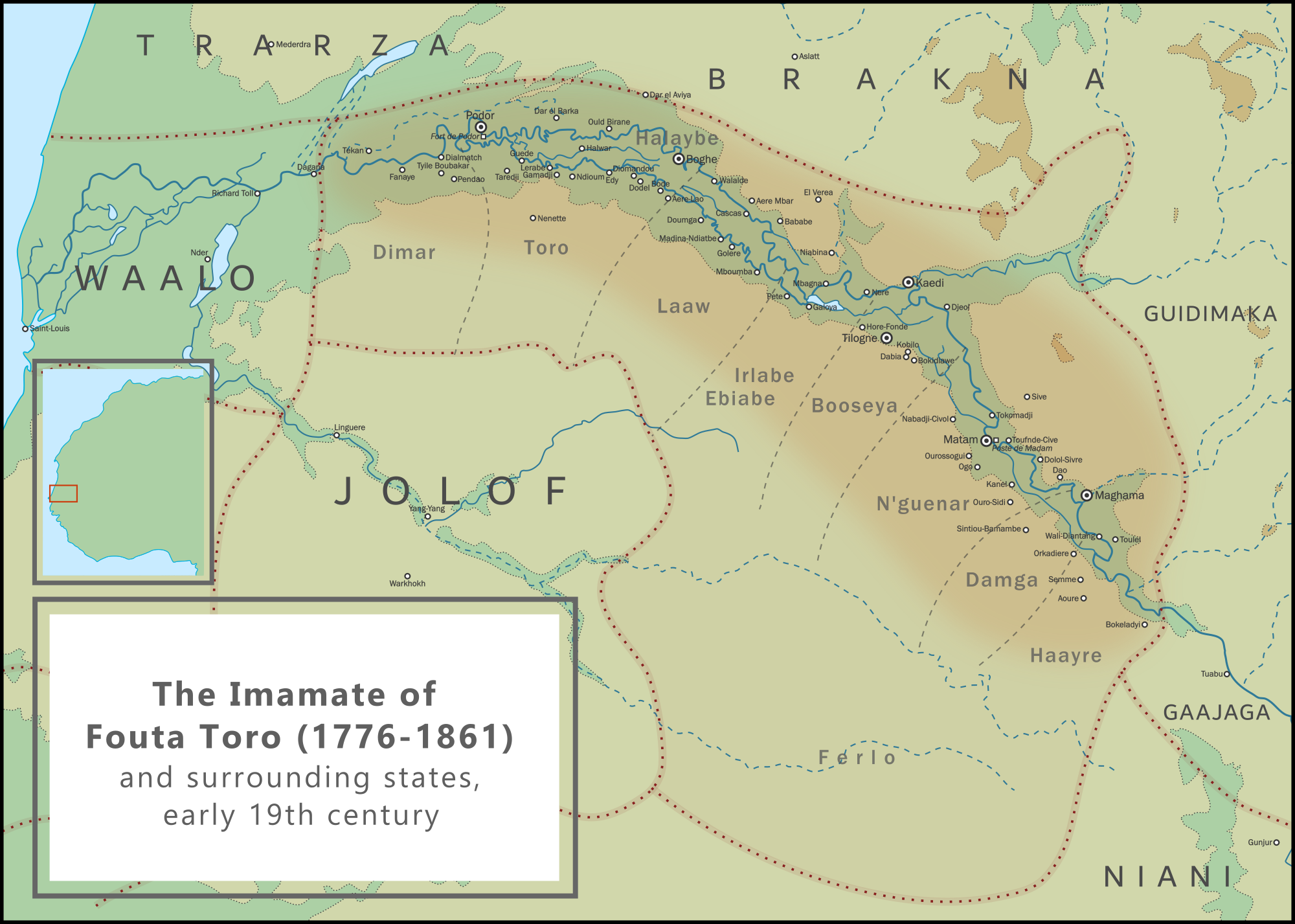
Map of the Imamate of Futa Toro, early 19th century

The Futa Toro stretches for about 400 kilometers, but only a narrow band of up to 20 kilometers on either side of the Senegal River is well watered and fertile. The interior, away from the river, is porous, dry and infertile. Historically, each of the Futa Toro geographical provinces were fertile pockets of the waalo flood plains, and this resource was controlled by kin groups. The long stretch meant the region was divided among many families, and the transmission of property rights from one generation to the next led to many family disputes, political crises and conflicts.

== History ==
The Fula first arrived in what is now Futa Toro during the reign of the Wagadu Empire, fleeing the increasingly arid Adrar and Hodh regions. Nomadic pastoralists, they mixed with the earlier proto-Serer and Wolof fishing and farming populations.

Futa Toro was one of the first regions in West Africa to become Islamized, by the 11th century. Known as Takrur at the time, it became wealthy on the trans-Saharan trade, particularly after the Almoravid capture of Aoudaghost stifled competing commercial centers. A target for conquerors, however, Futa Toro was conquered or vassalized sequentially by the Wagadu, the Sosso Empire, the Mali Empire, and the Jolof Empire.

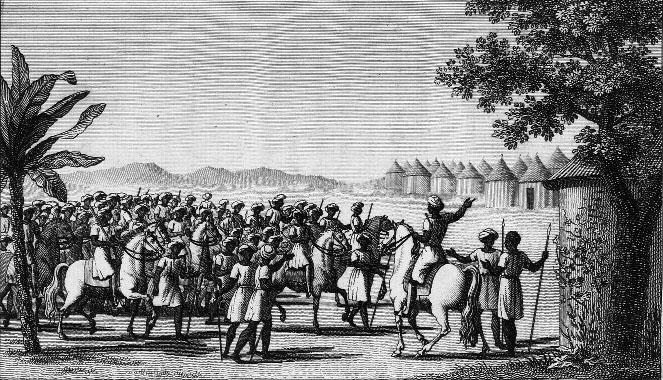
The army of Futa Toro in march (1820).

Koli Tenguella founded the state of Denanke in the early 16th century, breaking this cycle. The rise of the Almamyate of Futa Toro in 1776, which ended Denanke rule, inspired a series of Islamic reform movements and jihads around the region, led by groups of educated Fula Muslims known as the Torodbe. In the 1780s Abdul Kader became almaami (religious leader or imam) of Futa Toro but his forces were unable to establish their control over the surrounding states.

The Almamyate of Futa Toro later became the prime recruiting ground for the jihads of Toucouleur conqueror al-Hajj Umar Tall and anti-colonial rebel al-Hajj Mahmadu Lamine. Despite resistance, the Futa Toro was firmly in the hands of French Colonial forces moving from modern Senegal by 1900. Upon independence, the southern bank of the Senegal River where Futa Toro was and is located has remained in Senegal. The north bank along the border with Mauritania is called Chemama and is a part of Mauritania.

=== Provinces ===
Historically the western part was called Toro, and the central portion includes Bosea, Yirlabe Hebbyabe, Law and Hailabe provinces. The eastern Futa includes Ngenar and Damga provinces. During the height of Fula power in the region from the 11th to the 17th centuries, Futa Toro included the plains up to the Tagant and Assaba plateaus. The valley of the Gorgol river on the north bank, with the royal capital of Takrur, was the heartland. Beginning in the 17th century, however, Futa Toro shrank as the Sahara dried and Berber and Hassani attacks intensified.

== See also ==
- Imamate of Futa Toro
- Fulani people
- Toucouleur people
- Chemama
