= Battle of Jenné =

1599 battle between Morocco and the Mali Empire

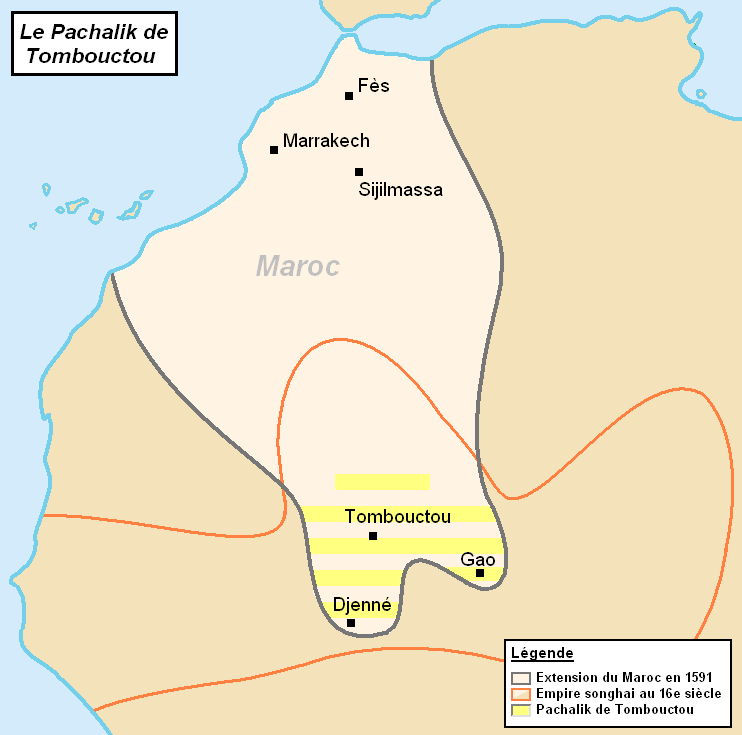
- Map of the Pashalik of Timbuktu (striped) as part of Morocco, late 16th century
Date	April 26, 1599
Location	Djenné, Mali
Result	Moroccan Victory

Belligerents
Mali Empire	Sultanate of Morocco; Pashalik of Timbuktu

Commanders and leaders
Mansa Mahmud IV	Governor Sayyid Mansur; Qa’id al-Mustafa al-Fil; Qa’id Ali bin Abd Allah al-Tilimsani; Jenne-koi Muhammad Kinba bin Isma’il; Hammad Amina of Masina; Bukar of Kala

Strength
Mandinka infantry and cavalry armed with lance and bow Bamana infantry and cavalry armed with lance and bow	Moroccan infantry armed with arquebus Mandinka infantry and cavalry armed with lance and bow

Casualties and losses
Unknown but substantial	Unknown

The Battle of Jenné was a military engagement between forces of the Mali Empire and the Moroccan Pashalik of Timbuktu.

== Background ==
Throughout the 15th and 16th centuries, the Mali Empire had been in near-constant state of decline. All of its periphery vassal territories had become independent states with some even challenging Mali's sovereignty, notably Songhai. In 1591, the Songhai Empire was defeated at the Battle of Tondibi by a Moroccan expeditionary force. Thanks to the Moroccans' use of gunpowder weapons such as the arquebus and cannon, Songhai power was pushed back eastward across the Niger where they formed the smaller but still robust Dendi Kingdom. With Songhai out of the way, the ruler of Mali Mansa Mahmud IV set his sights on rebuilding his moribund empire. The first step in this grand plan would be to seize the valuable city-state of Jenné, which controlled trade along the inland Niger valley.

=== Mali forces ===
Mansa Mahmud IV set about rallying his remaining provinces along with groups that had formerly been vassals of the Mali Empire. He sent out an envoy to his last two provinces of Binduku (Bendugu), Kala and Sibiridugu. Only two minor chiefs responded with a promise of aid in the upcoming battle. These were the kings, called “koi” in the Tarik es-Soudan of Farka or Fadku (part of Kala) and Ama. Another minor leader who offered his assistance at the time was Hammad Amina, a Fulbe chief ruling in Masina. Still, the mansa was able to raise a substantial army and marched on Jenné with the hopes of resuscitating his dying empire.

=== Pashalik forces ===
The trading emporium of Jenné was subject to the Moroccan pashalik of Timbuktu, named for the city where the Moroccan expeditionary force governed from. Previously, the pashalik had taken Jenné without a fight and preserved its king, Muhammad Kinba bin Isma’il on the throne under a Moroccan resident, Governor Sayyid Mansur. There are no details on what kind of troops were present when the mansa first began marching toward it, but once the governor was alerted, he sent word to Timbuktu for reinforcements. In response, Pasha Ammar sent a force headed by Qa’id al-Mustafa al-Fil and Qa’id Ali bin Abd Allah al-Tilimsani, which included arquebusiers.

== Breakout from Sanuna ==
The Moroccan reinforcements arrived via river boats, making good use of the city's position on the Niger to ferry troops quickly to the battle. They arrived on April 26 to find Mansa Mahmud IV and his army encamped over the entire dune of Sanuna, which reached down into the creek where the boats were to enter the city. The reinforcements had to fight their way into the city. Using their guns in what Arab records call a massive bombardment, the reinforcements were able to repel the mansa's army. The pashalik forces entered the city, but the Mali army was still encamped and far from defeated.

== Noon attack ==
Inside Jenné, Governor Sayyid Mansur was advised to attack the mansa's forces immediately before anyone else rallied to his banner. After making counsel with his advisors he is quoted as saying:

Our encounter with them shall be after the noon worship on Friday.”

True to his word the governor along with the king of Jenne went out and engaged the Mali army again. It was a complete rout, with the Mali army suffering many casualties. At the end of the battle, Mansa Mahmud IV was forced to flee.

== Aftermath ==
Mali's defeat at Jenne destroyed the temporary alliance Mahmud IV was able to pull together, and the Mali Empire ceased to be a political factor in the region. The mansa still received a great deal of respect for even attempting to re-establish the empire, according to Arab records. The Moroccans’ allies, says the Ta’rikh al-Sudan,

Having met him in a safe place, saluted him as sultan and bore their heads to do him honour, as was their custom.

Mansa Mahmud IV retired to Niani and died by 1610. His three sons tore the remnants of the country apart, and Mali became a scattering of loosely allied chiefdoms. These were swallowed up by the Bamana Empire, which even the pashalik of Timbuktu would eventually have to pay tribute to. Still, none of the emergent powers would come close to the hegemony of Mali or Songhai. West Africa transitioned to a region ruled by smaller and less centralized states until the 19th century.

== Reasons for the Mandinka defeat ==
The defeat of Mahmud IV at Jenné has been attributed to several causes. Details are sparse on the nature of both armies. The overarching theme in why the battle turned out the way it did revolves around the ability of each side to rally its forces. In few other instances are the effects of imperial collapse in the face of a changing political and military environment so well demonstrated. The Mali which faced off against the pashalik forces and its native allies was not the grand military of Mansa Musa. In fact, it had reversed back to its pre-imperial structure just at the time when leaps forward in technology and organization were essential to the empire's survival.

=== Unreliable allies ===
One of the most highlighted is the mansa's betrayal by Hammad Amina, the chief of the Fulbe at Masina. Previously, Amina had promised support in taking Jenné, but went over to the Moroccans with whom he already had a king-vassal type relationship. He advised the Moroccans on what to expect from the Mandinka-Bamana force and kept his own forces from joining the battle. The Fulbe are not mentioned as lending military aid to Jenné's defenders, but their absence from the battlefield may have had a great effect on the final outcome. The pashalik of Timbuktu would also regret putting faith in Hammad Amina. The Fulbe would eventually thrown off their nominal vassalage to the pashalik and hand the Moroccans their first major defeat in the Sahel.

=== Unreliable Provinces ===
Apart from Amina's betrayal, another reason for Mali's defeat may lay in its inability to draw on its remaining provinces for men. Had Mahmud IV been able to draw on the support of his traditional division commanders (the Sanqara-Zuma and Farim-Soura), he would have also had access to the reluctant the governor or Kala-sha of Kala province. Kala-sha Bukar refused to join the mansa without the two commanders, remarking in private:

Since his two greatest lieutenants are not accompanying him, the situation is hopeless.

Mali's disunity, already in full throttle since the mid-16th century had finally caught up with it at Jenné. In fact when Mansa Mahmud IV went to Kala to fetch what he still believed to be a loyal ally, he found that the Kala-sha had left for Jenné to fight alongside the Moroccans.

=== Gunpowder ===
Lastly, the Mali Empire, like its Songhai competitor, had failed to modernize its military machine. This was not for lack of trying, however. Previous mansas had tried in vain to purchase firearms or firearm-equipped mercenaries from the Portuguese to no avail. The Mali Empire went to war with the same methods it had been using since the days of Sundjata but without the unity or scale of its past armies.

On the other hand, the gunpowder weapons of the pashalik soldiers were not decisive against the Mali Empire, despite the latter's reliance on traditional infantry and cavalry forces. The use of guns saved the pashalik reinforcements from annihilation (along with the timely intervention of the king of Jenné), but they didn't set the mansa's forces to flight either. Mansa Mahmud IV and his army stayed encamped at the dune of Sanuna awaiting a second engagement. The Moroccans were now faced with the law of diminishing return, as their guns did not have the tactical effect they had held not even a decade earlier. A Mali Empire armed with guns instead of lances and arrows might have stopped Jenné's reinforcement or taken the city outright.

== See also ==
- Military history of the Mali Empire
- Mansa Mahmud IV
- Djenne
- Mali Empire
- History of Mali

== Sources ==
- De Villiers & Sheila Hirtle (2007). Timbuktu: the sahara's Fabled City of Gold. New York: Walker & Company. pp. 302 pages. ISBN 978-0-8027-1497-8.
- Gray, Richard (1975). The Cambridge History of Africa: From c. 1600 to c. 1790. Cambridge: Cambridge University Press. pp. 752 pages. ISBN 0-521-20413-5.
- Holt, P.M.; Ann K. S. Lambton & Bernard Lewis (1977). The Cambridge history of Islam. Cambridge: Cambridge University Press. pp. 966 pages. ISBN 0-521-29137-2.
- Hunwick, John (1988). Timbuktu & the Songhay Empire: Al-Sa'dis Ta'rikh al-sudan down to 1613 and other Contemporary Documents. Leiden: BRILL. pp. 480 pages. ISBN 90-04-12822-0.
- Ki-Zerbo, J. & D.T. Niane (1998). UNESCO General History of Africa, Vol. IV: Africa from the Twelfth to the Sixteenth Century (Abridged ed.). Berkeley: University of California Press. pp. 277 Pages. ISBN 0-520-06699-5.
- Oliver, Roland (1975). The Cambridge History of Africa Volume 3 1050 – c. 1600. Cambridge: Cambridge University Press. pp. 816 Pages. ISBN 0-521-20981-1.
- Shillington, Kevin (2004). Encyclopedia of African History, Vol. 1. London: Routledge. pp. 1912 Pages. ISBN 1-57958-245-1.
- Thornton, John K. (1998). Africa and Africans in the Making of the Atlantic World, 1400-1800 (Second ed.). Cambridge: Cambridge University Press. pp. 378 Pages. ISBN 0-521-62724-9.
