= Koli Tenguella =

Fulani monarch

- Silatigi
- Reign: 1512-1537
- Predecessor: Tenguella
- Born: between 1450 and 1455; Futa Toro
- Died: 1537
- House: Denianke dynasty
- Father: Tenguella
- Mother: Nana Keita
- Religion: Traditional African

Koli Tenguella (also referred to as Koli Tenguella Bâ/Bah, Koli Tengella Jaaje Baa and Koli Pullo) (r. 1512–1537) was a Fulani warrior and leader who was pivotal in establishing the Empire of Great Fulo.

== Family ==
Koli was the son of Tenguella, who led a regional conflict against the Mali Empire and Songhai Empire. His mother, Nana Keita, is said in traditional histories to be descended from Sundiata Keita.

== In Futa Jallon ==
Tenguella raised the Fula, who lived all across the region, against the existing empires. As part of this effort, he sent Koli south to raise the Fula of Fuladu, Beledougou, Birgo and Wassoulou in revolt against Mali. This main thrust was defeated, however, and he fell back to the Futa Jallon. His forces settled there in a region known as Dena, sometimes called Bajar in oral histories. According to local legend Koli himself lived in a large cave known as Gueme Sangan, but his power base was Labe. They reinforced the two-centuries old Fula presence at the expense of the native Jallonke people.

From his base in the mountains, Koli attacked the kingdoms of Wuli and Niani on the north bank of the Gambia River. This threatened Malian control of the gold-producing Bambouk region. He also destroyed the remains of Namandirou and fought with a war against Saloum.

== Reign ==
Koli assumed leadership when his father was killed by the Songhai during an invasion of the Kingdom of Diarra in 1512. There are two conflicting accounts of Koli's whereabouts when he took power. In one telling, his father had left him in Futa Djallon while invading Diarra, then when he learned of his father's death Koli recruited a large multiethnic army and headed north. The alternative version has Koli accompanying his father and leading the army back to Futa Toro in the wake of the defeat against the Songhai.

Koli's base in Futa Jallon soon came under Malian pressure and this, along with a famine, drove him to leave the mountains. He proceeded to invade large swathes of what is now eastern Senegal and The Gambia, defeating the small kingdoms of the area piecemeal between approximately 1512 and 1520. Upon arriving in Futa Toro, he gradually overcame the many farbas, agents of the burba of Jolof and the Diawaras of Diarra, establishing his capital at Anyam-Godo. He then invaded and repeatedly defeated the Jolof Empire. In 1534 he may have attacked Bambuk but was repulsed by the Mandinka. Koli died in 1537, but his successors continued expanding, ultimately controlling the entire area between the upper Senegal and upper Niger River by around 1600.

== Legacy ==
Koli Tenguella is a well-known subject of oral histories in Senegambia. He is the ancestor of the royal and noble dynasty of Déniyankobés, the Bâ genealogy to which also belong to the Koli clans Teghéla, Rella, Dianga, Soulé, Diye, Waranka, as well as those of Sanghé Lobaly, Waly and Sinthiane Padalal. The dynasty was named after Dena, Koli's home in Futa Jallon.

The Sonko family, a royal clan from the Kingdom of Barra, claim descent from Koli Tenguella, but this is likely a 19th century invention for political reasons.

== Bibliography ==
=== Sources ===
- Kane, Oumar (2004). La première hégémonie peule. Le Fuuta Tooro de Koli Teηella à Almaami Abdul. Paris: Karthala.
- Kane, Oumar (2021). "La Formation du Royaume Jaalalo du Kingi par Tenghella". In Fall, Mamadou; Fall, Rokhaya; Mane, Mamadou (eds.). Bipolarisation du Senegal du XVIe - XVIIe siecle (in French). Dakar: HGS Editions. pp. 42–92.
