= Yves Person =

Yves Person (12 October 1925 - 17 November 1982) was an influential French Africanist and historian.

== Biography ==
Born in 1925, Yves person received an education in history from the Sorbonne, Fula and Mandinka languages from the Ecole des Langues Orientales and ethnology from the Musée de l’Homme. Between 1948 and 1961 he served in the French Colonial administration in Dahomey, Guinea and Ivory Coast, then collected oral histories in Ivory Coast for two years to create post-independence history textbooks.

He taught at the University of Dakar and the University of Montreal before finishing his career as professor of contemporary African history at the Sorbonne beginning in 1971. He was a pioneer in the use of native oral histories in academic research.

== Selected publications ==
- Person, Yves (1968–1975). Samori, Une révolution Dyula. Vol. 3 volumes. Dakar: IFAN. p. 2377 pages. A fourth volume of maps published in Paris in 1990. Monumental work of history perhaps unique in African literature.
