= Askia Muhammad Gao =

Ruler of the Songhai Empire

Muhammad Gao

Askia of the Songhai Empire
- Reign: October-December 1591
- Predecessor: Askia Ishaq II
- Successor: Askia Nuh
- Died: early 1592; Gao
Names
- Muhammad Gao ibn Dawud ibn Muhammad al-Turi
- Dynasty: Askia dynasty
- Father: Askia Daoud

Askia Muhammad Gao was the last ruler of the Songhai Empire. A son of Askia Daoud, he assumed power in the last months of 1591 after the defeat of Askia Ishaq II by Moroccan forces at the Battle of Tondibi and the subsequent Battle of Bamba. About forty days after taking power he was lured into a trap by Moroccans, captured, and later executed.

== Biography ==
=== Before assuming power ===
Muhammad Gao was one of the many sons of Askia Daoud, who ruled the Songhai from 1549 to 1582. While during Daoud's life the empire was stable and orderly, after his death, numerous descendants began to vie for power. Muhammad Gao took part in Kurmina-fari Al-Hadi's conspiracy against Askia Al-Hajj, but he changed sides along with his other brothers and turned against the rebel.

During the reign of Askia Ishaq II, Muhammad Gao served as Balma’a, military commander of Kabara near Timbuktu.

When the Moroccans invaded Songhai in 1591, Askia Ishaq II lost the first major battle at Tondibi in March. The Sultan of Morocco rejected the Askia's peace proposal and sent another expedition led by Pasha Mahmud ibn Zarkun. Another decisive battle took place on the Niger River, near the town of Bamba, where the Songhai army was again defeated. Muhammad Gao participated in the fighting against the pasha's troops and was shot with a musket during the retreat, resulting in an illness.

=== Rise to the Askiyate ===
Ishaq II gathered a unit of 1,200 elite horsemen and ordered his hi-koi (chief naval commander), Laha, to strike the pasha in the town of Kukiya. Muhammad Gao was supposed to join this unit, leading 100 cavalrymen, but his soldiers proclaimed him as the new Askia, while Ishaq II fled to the Gurma province, where he was killed. Another version of the story suggests that the battle itself took place in Gurma, and immediately afterward Askia Ishaq fled, ultimately meeting his death at the hands of the Tuaregs. In this case, Muhammad Gao's assumption of power would have a different context. One of the new Askia's first actions was to free two of his brothers who had been imprisoned by Askia Muhammad Bani – fari-mundio Tafa and benga-farma Nuh.

=== Capture and Death ===
Some of Muhammad Gao's brothers, led by Suleiman, began to defect to the invaders. To prevent the fragmentation of the state, the new Askia initiated peace negotiations through his secretary Bukar Lanbar with the pasha Mahmud. The Moroccans, short of food, asked Muhammad for food assistance, which he agreed to provide. The pasha declared that a condition for peace was the personal oath of allegiance to the Moroccan Sultan by the Askia and his dignitaries. Despite numerous doubts and warnings, especially from hi-koi Laha, Muhammad Gao agreed to these terms, encouraged by the assurances given by his secretary. Pasha Mahmud ben Zergun held a reception for the arriving guests, during which he ordered the imprisonment of all Songhai people except Bukar, raising suspicions that he was complicit. Michel proposes that Qaid Mami was in fact the one who suggested to Muhammad Gao that, as a gesture of goodwill, he should provide food to the starving residents of Timbuktu. When the Askia arrived with supplies, he and his entourage were murdered on Mahmud's orders. The reign of Askia Muhammad Gao is estimated to have lasted for forty days.

Askia and 18 dignitaries were transported to Gao and imprisoned in the royal palace. After a month in Gao, perhaps two months after they were initially captured, the entire party was executed in retaliation for a Songhai raid on Moroccan reinforcements crossing the desert.

== Successors ==
After the death of Askia Muhammad Gao, Songhai split into two warring factions. In place of the slain Muhammad, the army chose Nuh, who had been freed by Muhammad, as the new Askia. He managed to evacuate many Songhai people from the areas controlled by Morocco. With them, he went to Dendi, giving rise to a new, diminished kingdom. Mahmud ben Zergun decided to appoint a new Askia to calm the Songhai people. The chosen one was another son of Askia Daoud, Suleiman, who was the first to acknowledge the authority of the Moroccans.

== Family tree ==
Askia Muhammad Gao was the son of Askia Daoud and the grandson of the founder of the Askia dynasty, Muhammad I. Due to the large number of sons of Askia Muhammad I and Askia Daoud, the family tree is limited to the reigning members of the Songhai dynasty (highlighted in green). Among Muhammad Gao's other brothers, rulers of the Dendi kingdom can be mentioned, such as Askia Nuh, Askia Al-Mustafa, Askia Muhammad Sorko, Askia Harun, and Askia Al-Amin, as well as Askia Pashaliku Arm Suleiman.

Abi Bakr
Askia Muhammad I	Amar Kamdiago
Askia Musa	Askia Isma'il	Askia Ishaq I	Askia Daoud	Askia Muhammad Benkan
Askia Al-Hajj	Askia Mohammad Bani	Askia Ishaq II	Askia Muhammad Gao

== Bibliography ==
- al-Sadi, Abd; Hunwick, John (2003). Timbuktu and the Songhay Empire: Al-Sa'Di's Ta'Rikh Al-Sudan Down to 1613 and Other Contemporary Documents. Brill Academic. ISBN 978-9004128224.
- Gomez, Michael (2018). African dominion : a new history of empire in early and medieval West Africa. Princeton, NJ: Princeton University Press. ISBN 9780691177427.
- Michel, Jonathan (1995). "The Invasion of Morocco in 1591 and the Saadian Dynasty".
- Tymowski, Michał (1979). Historia Mali. Historia Powszechna (in Polish). Wrocław: Ossolineum. ISBN 83-04-00212-4.
