= Pashalik of Timbuktu =

1591–1833 Moroccan polity in West Africa

Pashalik of Timbuktu باشوية تمبكتو (Arabic) Pachalik de Tombouctou (French)
- 1591–1833
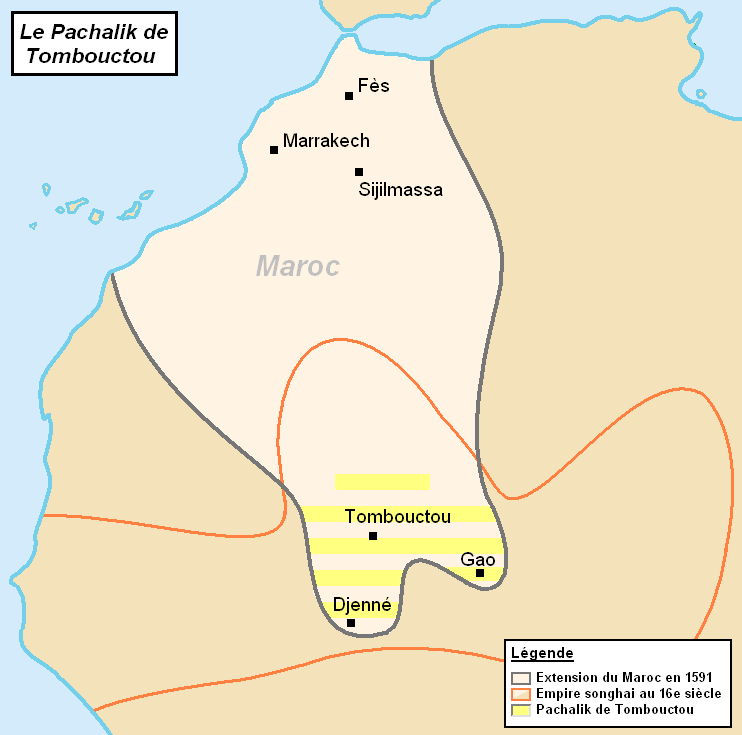
- Map of the Pashalik of Timbuktu (striped) as part of Morocco, late 16th century.
- Status: Moroccan Governorate (1591–1621); Moroccan Vassal (1621–1826); Tuareg Tributary (1787–1833)
- Capital: Timbuktu
- Religion: Islam
- History
  - Established: 1591
  - Disestablished: 1833
Preceded by	Succeeded by
Songhai Empire	Caliphate of Hamdullahi
- Today part of: Mali

The Pashalik of Timbuktu, also known as the Pashalik of Sudan, was a West African political entity that existed between the 16th and the 19th century. It was formed after the Battle of Tondibi, when a military expedition sent by Saadian sultan Ahmad al-Mansur of Morocco defeated the Songhai Empire and established control over a territory centered on Timbuktu. Following the decline of the Saadi Sultanate in the early 17th century, Morocco retained only nominal control of the Pashalik.

== Background ==
By the end of the 16th century, Moroccan Sultans were strengthened after the completion of the reunification of Morocco and the victory over the Portuguese at the Battle of the Three Kings, but their financial needs lead them to extend their realm southward to Saharan gold mines and Songhay territories.

Saadian interest in the Sudan region preceded Ahmad al-Mansur. Ahmad al-'Araj, the Emir of Marrakesh, had asked Askia Ishaq I, Emperor of the Songhai Empire between 1539 and 1549, to grant him control of the salt mines of Taghaza . Ishaq I sent a group of 2,000 mounted men to raid a market town in the Draa valley of southern Morocco with instructions to avoid killing anyone. This was intended as a show of strength.

In 1556–1557 troops of Mohammed al-Shaykh, the Sultan of Morocco, occupied the Taghaza salt mines and killed Askia Dawud's official in charge of salt extraction there. The Tuareg shifted the production to another mine called Taghaza al-Ghizlan.

Soon after his accession in 1578, Sultan Ahmad al-Mansur brought the issue up again with Emperor Askia Dawud, asking the latter to pay him the equivalent of the tax revenues generated from the mines. Askia Dawud responded by sending a large quantity of gold as a gift. In 1583 Al-Mansur's forces successfully occupied the Touat and the Gourara oases. This occupation secured the Moroccan advance toward the south,and had the objective of conquering the Sudan and building up a huge empire. In 1586 a small Saadian force of 200 musketeers again occupied Taghaza, which marked the start of the gradual decline of the Songhai Empire. The Tuareg moved to yet another site – probably Taoudenni. In 1589 or early 1590 Ahmad al-Mansur then asked Askia Ishaq II to pay him an amount of gold proportional to the amount of salt taken from the mines, which Ishaq II contemptuously refused. This provided the pretext for Al-Mansur to invade the Songhai Empire.

== History ==
=== Establishment and early years ===
The Saadian military expedition, composed of about 20,000 men, left Marrakesh on October 16, 1590, and reached the village of Karabara, near Bamba, along the Niger River in February 1591. It was led by Judar Pasha, a commander of Spanish origin. While the Songhai army was reportedly larger, it lacked firearms, unlike the Moroccans. At the Battle of Tondibi, in March, the Saadian army thus won a decisive victory. Having been soundly defeated, the Songhai evacuated their capital of Gao, which was quickly occupied by the Moroccan army. The Moroccan army encamped outside the city of Timbuktu on April 25th, and captured it on May 30th. Timbuktu became the official capital of the Pashalik. Judar Pasha was prepared to make peace with Askia Ishaq II. Al-Mansur recalled and replaced him with the second highest ranking officer in the Moroccan army, Mahmud ibn Zarqun. Mahmud Pasha seized the traditional capital of Kukiya, drove Ishaq II from the country to his death among the Gurmanche, laid a fatal trap for Ishaq's appointed successor, Muhammad Gao, and endeavoured to wipe out the last pockets of Songhai resistance in Dendi. The Moroccan army conquered Djenné in 1592 and established a number of fortifications along the Niger. Djenné, Gao and Timbuktu were sacked, pillaged, and burnt to the ground. The remnants of the Songhai, led by Askia Nuh, were finally defeated in 1595 at the hands of Mansur ibn Abd al-Rahman (1595–96). Askia Nuh was deposed in 1599; the Moroccans then an Askia as the Songhai of Dendi who remained under their control. Al-Mansur's army limited itself to the occupation of certain river ports, where they installed kasbahs (permanent garrisons). These included Djenné, Wandiaka, Koubi, Konna, Sebi, Tendirma, Issafay, Kabara, Timbuktu, Bamba, Bourem, Gao and Kukiya. Mansa Mahmud IV of the Mali Empire saw prospects for reviving the power of the old Songhai Empire. In 1599 he attacked Djenné, but was defeated by Moroccan reinforcements sent in boats from Timbuktu. As a result, Mali ceased to be a political factor on the middle Niger.

Sultan Ahmad al-Mansur had died of plague in August 1603, but his successors and their generals carried on the struggle against West Africa. After 1612, the Pashas who governed the Sudan region were appointed locally by the Arma. The commander of the Arma, Ali ben Abdallah al-Tilimsani, deposed the Moroccan governor and proclaimed himself the new Pasha of Timbuktu without authorization from the Moroccan Sultan. The Arma continued to nominated their own commanders, while formally recognizing Moroccan sovereignty. Timbuktu and the Niger bend region had thus become a Moroccan bled es-siba. Sultan Moulay Zidan relinquished direct control over the Sudan territories in 1618.

=== During the Arma reign ===
Despite Morocco's gradual withdrawal from Sudan after Al-Mansur's death, the Pashas of Timbuktu remained loyal to the last sultans of the Saadi dynasty. The Friday khutbah (sermon in a mosque) was recited every week in the name of the rulers in Marrakesh, who announced their accession to the throne to the Pashas in Timbuktu and the heads of the garrisons in Gao and Djenné.

The rule of the Arma over Timbuktu lasted until 1737, but it was characterized by constant feuds and internal strife and the succession of pashas: from 1591 to 1833 Timbuktu saw 167 pashas, but only a few survived more than a year in power, among them Mahmud ibn Zarqun (1591–95), Mahmud Longo (1604–12), Ali ben Abdallah al-Tilimsani (1612–17), and Masud ibn Mansur al-Zari (1637–43). The position of the pasha rotated among three paramount fractions of the Arma, namely the Fassiyin (from Fes), the Marrakshiyyin (from Marrakesh), and the Shraqa (from Tlemcen), while the Dra'a (from the Oued Draa) represented a weaker yet highly respected regional affiliation.

In 1630 the Songhai of Dendi signed a peace treaty with the Moroccans, who subsequently began to interfere in their internal affairs and arbitrate in their succession disputes. But they retained their freedom until the beginning of the nineteenth century, despite strong pressure from the Fulbe and Touareg nomads from Liptako and Aïr.

=== During the Alawite era ===
The Alawite dynasty resumed Moroccan politics of expansion across the Sahara and established a Moroccan base in the southwestern Sahara. Unlike the Saadis, the Alawites paid little attention to the Nigerian Sahel. Their policy was oriented towards Mauritania rather than the Sudan.

Sultan Moulay al-Rashid sent a force which, in September 1671, arrived in Timbuktu to receive the formal allegiance of its warring Arma factions. Although no large scale army is recorded in Moroccan or West African sources as having arrived at Timbuktu during this time, but only from one European writer over a decade later. In 1683 an ambassador and governor in Morocco listing the territories under Moroccan rule to Alain Manesson Mallet did not include Timbuktu as a dependency. The Tadhkirat al-Nasydn, a locally written 18th century chronicle, mentions that a Moroccan emissary arrived at Timbuktu in 1709 but it had no affect on the relations between the two regions. John Windus writing in 1721 had Morocco only extending as far south as Cape Blanco. 1738, a Moroccan expedition reached Ras al-Ma west of Timbuktu and four Moroccan royal missions visited Timbuktu between 1730 and 1745. With the coming to power of Sultan Sidi Muhammad (r. 1757–90), Morocco's policy in the Sudan made a fresh start based on the revival of trade across the Sahara. Like the last of the Saadi Kings, the Alawite Sultan referred to himself as 'Sovereign of Gao and Guinea' in his correspondence with European governments. But the region during this time was noted by a Moroccan traveler there as being under the control of the "Sultan of Hausa."

=== Decline and later years ===
By the middle of the eighteenth century, the pashalik was in total eclipse. In about 1770, the Tuareg took possession of Gao, and in 1787 they entered Timbuktu and made the Pashalik their tributary.

== References and Bibliography ==
=== Bibliography ===
- Elias N. Saad (1983). Social History of Timbuktu The Role of Muslim Scholars and Notables, 1400-1900. Cambridge University Press. ISBN 978-0-521-24603-3.
- Fage, J.D.; Gray, Richard; Oliver, Roland (1975). The Cambridge History of Africa. Cambridge University Press. ISBN 978-0-521-20413-2.
  - N. Levtzion, Chp. III - North-West Africa: from the Maghrib to the fringes of the forest, pp. 142–222
    - The pashalik of Timbuktu, pp. 152–158
    - Timbuktu, Jenne and Massina under the Arma, pp. 158–164
    - The Arma, Songhay and Tuareg, pp. 165–171
    - The Bambara states, pp. 171–182
- Grémont, Charles (2010). Les Touaregs Iwellemmedan, 1647-1896 un ensemble politique de la boucle du Niger. KARTHALA Editions. ISBN 978-2-8111-0397-2.
  - Chp. III - Karidenna, ancêtre historique et figure emblématique (1647–1713), pp. 149–212
  - Chp. IV - Les Iwellemmedan au XVIIIe siècle: émergence d'une entité politique, pp. 213–290
- M. Abitbol, Tombouctou et les Arma: de la conquête marocaine du Soudan nigérien en 1591 a l'hégémonie de l'Empire peul du Macina en 1833, Ed. Maisonneuve et Larose, 1979. (ISBN 2706807709)
  - B. Rosenberg, Michel Abitbol, Tombouctou et les Arma. De la conquête marocaine du Soudan nigérien en 1591 à l'hégémonie de l'Empire Peulh du Macina en 1833 (compte rendu), in: Annales. Économies, Sociétés, Civilisations 37(4), 1982, pp. 833–836
- Bethwell A. Ogot (1992). Africa from the Sixteenth to the Eighteenth Century. UNESCO. ISBN 978-92-3-101711-7.
  - M. Abitbol, Chp. XI - The end of the Songhay empire, pp. 300–326
- Davoine, Robert (2003). Tombouctou fascination et malédiction d'une ville mythique. L'Harmattan. ISBN 978-2-7475-3939-5.
