= Mahmud ibn Zarkun =

Moroccan eunuch who rose to the rank of pasha

Mahmud ibn Zarkun, also known as Mahmud ben Zergun (Arabic: محمود بن زرقون, Maḥmūd ibn Zarqūn), was a Maghrebi eunuch who rose to the rank of pasha. For a time, he served as the commander of all renegades during the Saadian rule. He succeeded Judar Pasha as the main commander of the Saadian invasion of the Songhai Empire from 1591 to 1595. During the battle of Bamba, he defeated Askia Ishaq II and later killed his successor, Askia Muhammad Gao, through a deceitful trap. He continued fighting against Askia Nuh, who succeeded Muhammad. Mahmud was responsible for the repression and plunder of Timbuktu. Ahmad al-Mansur condemned him to death, but before the executioner could carry out the sentence, Mahmud died in a suicidal battle against the Songhai forces on 15 March 1595 near the Niger River.

== Biography ==
=== Invasion of Songhai ===
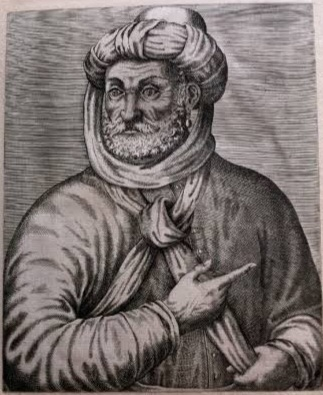
Sultan of Morocco Ahmad al-Mansur

Sultan Ahmad al-Mansur sent an expedition in 1590 to conquer Songhai. The expedition's initial leader, Judar Pasha, had achieved significant victories and offered peace to Askia Ishaq II. However, al-Mansur was angered by this peace proposal, as he sought to control all of the Sudanese state, particularly the gold mines. As a result, he sent Mahmud ibn Zarkun to take over the leadership of the Saddian invasion.

==== Dispute with Ishak II and Muhammad Gao ====
Mahmud's elite forces crossed the Sahara in just seven weeks, much faster than the first expedition led by Judar Pasha, which left Marrakesh on October 16, 1590, and reached the Niger River in February 1591. Mahmud's forces reached Timbuktu on 17 August 1591. Mahmud made the previous commander his deputy, who briefed him on the situation. Learning that the Songhai people fled across the river when threatened by the Moroccans, Mahmud decided to change this dynamic by constructing three barges within three weeks, using doors, window frames, and the few available trees.

With these preparations, Mahmud advanced to confront the Songhai forces. The decisive battle took place near the town of Bamba, where the Songhai army was crushed. Afterward, Ishaq II was overthrown and replaced by his brother Askia Muhammad Gao.

To avoid further conflict, the new Askia, Muhammad Gao, initiated peace talks through his secretary, Bukara Lanbaru. The Saadian forces were suffering from hunger, so Mahmud requested supplies from Muhammad, which he agreed to send. However, Mahmud stipulated that the peace agreement required Askia and his officials to personally swear allegiance to the Moroccans. Askia accepted, but during the ensuing reception for the food supply, Mahmud ordered the capture of all Songhai leaders except Bukara. Shortly afterward, Askia and 18 of his officials were transported to Gao and executed on Mahmud's orders. According to Michel, it was Kaid Mami who suggested bringing Askia to the peace talks. He advised Muhammad to send food to the starving people of Timbuktu as a gesture of goodwill. When Askia arrived with the food supplies, he and his entourage were murdered on Mahmud's orders, as Mahmud sought revenge for the losses the Moroccans had suffered during their crossing of the Sahara.

Mahmud ibn Zarkun then decided to install a new Askia on the territories he controlled, hoping this would calm the Sudanese. Suleiman, who was the first to acknowledge Saadian authority, was chosen. His brother, Nuh, evacuated many Songhai people from the areas occupied by Morocco, intending to continue resistance in Dendi.

==== Struggles for Dendi ====
Pasha Mahmud was aware of the Sultan's reaction to the peace offer sent to Marrakesh by Judar, and therefore, he concluded that he had to fully conquer the Songhai territory. He built a kasbah in the northern Nigerian town of Kolen, which became the base for his forces in Dendi. From there, he launched attacks and pursued the troops of Nuh, who were continually setting ambushes. Over the course of two years of fighting, Mahmud lost many soldiers due to diseases, and he also lost all his horses, with the food supply running low. Although, at Mahmud's request, Sultan al-Mansur sent numerous reinforcements, they were not able to defeat Askia's forces. In October 1593, Mahmud withdrew his troops from Dendi, leaving behind a garrison in Kolen, which was soon evacuated as well.

==== Policy towards Timbuktu ====
While Mahmud ibn Zarkun was waging war against Ishak II, the inhabitants of Timbuktu raised a rebellion. The order in the city was restored by the Kaid Mami, who entered Timbuktu on 27 December 1591 with 324 arquebusiers. He won the favor of the citizens by treating the rebels gently. For unclear reasons, Mahmud ibn Zarkun changed this policy. During the fighting in Dendi in October 1592, he ordered the public and brutal execution of two descendants of Sharif Ahmad as-Sakalli. To influence the occupiers' policy, Kadi Umar sent a letter to Marrakesh asking for the Sultan's mercy. Ahmad al-Mansur received the Kadi's envoys kindly and promised to end the repression, but secretly sent new troops with orders to arrest Umar and suppress any resistance.

After returning from Dendi, Pasha Mahmud plundered the nomadic Sanhaja tribes, but the spoils were deemed insufficient. To satisfy the Sultan's expectations, Mahmud decided to loot the residents of Timbuktu. He used a ruse, announcing that the houses of the inhabitants would be searched, and any found weapons would be confiscated. This decree did not apply to the descendants of Kadi Muhammad Akita, which led the citizens to hide their valuables in buildings owned by the Kadi's relatives. On October 18 and 19, Mahmud took an oath of allegiance from the merchants, and on October 20, he ordered the same from the ulama. When they gathered at the designated place, they were arrested by the Moroccans. During this time, their homes were ransacked, and all the valuables collected by the citizens fell into the hands of the occupiers. Some of the imprisoned scholars were killed outside the city walls, while the others were detained in the kasbah. This group, including Kadi Umar and the renowned writer Ahmad Baba, was deported to Morocco on 18 March 1594. Ahmad Baba was later freed due to the efforts of the Maghrebi ulama.

=== Death ===
Pasha Mahmud sent 100,000 mithkals of gold and slaves to Marrakesh. He distributed part of the remaining sum among his soldiers, while keeping the rest for himself. The distance from the metropolis meant that Mahmud did not attempt to conceal his luxuries, mocking the Sultan. This behavior led one of the kaids to send reports about him. Enraged, al-Mansur sent Kaid Mansur ibn Abd ar-Rahman to Timbuktu with orders to kill ibn Zarkun and take his position. Mahmud learned of his impending fate from a messenger sent by the Sultan's son, Bu Faris.

In an attempt to preempt his death, Mahmud set out on another military campaign against Askia Nuh. During a suicidal attack on Hombori on 15 March 1595, he was struck by an arrow and died. His army returned to Timbuktu under the leadership of Askia Suleiman. Askia Nuh sent Mahmud ibn Zarkun's head to Kanta Dawud, the Sultan of the allied Kebbi.

== Bibliography ==
- Tymowski, Michał (1979). Historia Mali [The History of Mali] (in Polish). Wrocław: Ossolineum. ISBN 83-04-00212-4.
- Tymowski, Michał (1979). Dzieje Timbuktu [The History of Timbuktu] (in Polish). Wrocław: Ossolineum.
- al-Sadi, Abd (2003). Timbuktu and the Songhay Empire: Al-Sa'Di's Ta'Rikh Al-Sudan Down to 1613 and Other Contemporary Documents. Brill Academic. ISBN 978-9004128224.
