= Askia Muhammad Bani =

Ruler of the Songhai Empire from 1586 to 1588

Muhammad Bani
- Askia of the Songhai Empire
- Reign: 1586-1588
- Coronation: December 1 1586
- Predecessor: Askia Al-Hajj
- Successor: Askia Ishaq II
- Died: April 9 1588 outside Gao
- Burial: Gao
- Dynasty: Askiya dynasty
- Father: Askia Daoud

Askia Muhammad Bani was the ruler of the Songhai Empire from 1586 to 1588. A son of Askia Daoud, he was elevated by his brothers after they had deposed Askia Al-Hajj, his predecessor.

Soon after taking power, he had two of his brothers who had rebelled against Al-Hajj and been imprisoned executed. This prompted alarm among his surviving brothers, who began to plot against him.

The spark for the revolt arose due to the depredations of the Kabara-farma ‘Alū, a royal eunuch slave who managed the administration of Kabara, the port of Timbuktu. He had illegally taxed the merchants and seized property from prominent clerics. When he imprisoned and whipped a slave of the Balma’a (military commander of Kabara) Muḥammad al-Ṣādiq b. Dāwūd, the prince personally confronted the royal official, stabbed him to death, and tossed his body into the street.

Balma’a Muḥammad, having defied the Askia, launched a rebellion. He was joined by Kanfari Salih, but they soon quarreled over the wealth taken from the Kabara-farma and Salih was killed. Still, Balma’a Muḥammad marched on the capital, Gao, with nearly the entire western half of the empire arrayed behind him. Muhammad Bani assembled an army of 30,000 and awaited their arrival, but the overweight Askia died of heatstroke, or perhaps an epileptic fit, on April 9th 1588, before the battle was joined.

After discovering the body, eunuch courtiers conspired to have Benga-farma Maḥmūd b. Ismail named as Askia. But another eunuch tipped off Ishaq, the oldest of the sons of Askia Daoud present, surrounded the conspirators and was himself proclaimed Askia on April 10th.
