= Askia Harun =

Harun Dankataya

Askia Dynasty
- Reign: 1599-1612
- Predecessor: Askia Nuh
- Successor: Askia al-Amin
- Born: c. 1570
- Dynasty: Askia Dynasty
- Father: Askia Daoud

Askia Harun, born Harun Dankataya, was the second ruler of the Dendi Kingdom, the rump state of the Songhai Empire.

== Reign ==
Askia Harun came to the throne in 1599 following the overthrow of his brother, Askia Nuh, by the people of Dendi. Under his reign the resistance against the Saadi Moroccans begin to take the offensive. In 1608 he invaded and occupied a large section of the Niger River valley. The pasha at that time had difficulties with the Fulani of Massina, while the Songhai followers of the puppet Askia refused to fight against their own kith and kin. For a time, the Moroccan troops did not challenge the Songhai of Dendi. This only increased their audacity and induced other peoples to seek their aid in opposing the Moroccans. Indeed, a year later in 1609, a Songhai army advanced to Djenne in response to the call of the rebellious Jenne-koi. The Songhai scored a victory over a Moroccan army on July 2, 1609 and departed with many prisoners and much booty. In 1610 Dendi had won a series of battles which led to major territorial and material gains in Massina, the granary of the Sudan.
