= Askia al-Amin =

al-Amin
- Reign: 1612-1618
- Predecessor: Askia Harun
- Successor: Askia Dawud II
- Died: 1618
- Dynasty: Askia Dynasty
- Father: Askia Daoud

Askia al-Amin was the third ruler of the Dendi Kingdom. He is remembered as a worthy ruler, who cared for his subjects and helped them during periods of famine and shortage.

== Reign ==
The political organization under was reign had stabilized. In his view, the last stage of the resistance had come, and final victory was at hand. The qa'id 'Ali led the counterattack. However, no battle resulted when the two armies met. As Al-Sa'di, author of the Tarikh al-Sudan wrote, 'they parted [in the same conditions] as they arrived.' He also suggested that the qa'id 'Ali had sent gold to the Dendi-fari as an inducement not to fight. The Askia al-Amin recalled the Dendi-fari and sentenced him to death by poisoning.

He died a natural death in 1618 and was succeeded by Askia Dawud II.
