= Askia Nuh =

Ruler of the Dendi Kingdom

Nuh I
- Reign: 1592-1599
- Predecessor: Askia Muhammad Gao
- Successor: Askia Harun
- Dynasty: Askia Dynasty
- Father: Askia Daoud

Askia Nuh was a ruler of the Dendi Kingdom, the rump state of the Songhai Empire. He was a son of Askia Dawud and established his capital at Lulami, from where Songhai resistance to the Saadi Moroccans continued.

== Conflict with the Saadi dynasty ==
Askia Nuh resisted the invasion of the Moroccan Pasha, Mahmud ibn Zarqun, by costly warfare. Sometime shortly after the death of Askia Muhammad Gao, Pasha Mahmud sent a contingent of hundreds of musketeers to pursue Nuh in Dendi, but this proved ineffective as Nuh killed nearly half of them at the Battle of Burni and avoided capture. Sometime during mid 1592 Ibnou Bentsi, one of his military commanders, massacred a Saadi reinforcement of 400 musketeers sent from Morocco. At first he led his army in person but after some time put Muhammad w. Banshi in charge of them, who continued to give the Moroccans more defeats. In 1594, having failed to capture Nuh and the casualties piling up, Mahmud was forced to cease the conflict and retreated, but was killed in the same year during a failed attack with 1,200 musketeers against the Dogon people with his head being cut off and sent to Nuh, who then sent it to Kanta Dawud of Kebbi, probably allies of Askia Nuh.

The new pasha called Mansur continued the war against Dendi Kingdom and Nuh adopted guerilla warfare once again. This state of affairs lasted until 1599, when Nuh's followers became tired of the war and deposed him in favor of his brother Harun.

== Sources ==
- Levtzion, Nehemia (2003). "North-West Africa: from the Maghrib to the fringes of the forest". In Richard Gray (ed.). The Cambridge History of Africa. Vol. 4. Cambridge University. pp. 142–222.
