= Lulami =

Capital of the Dendi Kingdom

- Loulami
- Type: Capital City
- Periods: Late Middle Ages
- Cultures: Songhai, Dendi
- Part of: Dendi Kingdom

Lulami (also Loulami) was the capital of the Dendi of the Songhai Empire. It was established by Askia Nuh, son of Askia Dawud and it is from here the Songhai resistance against the Saadians continued. In 1639, during the reign of Askia Ismail, the Maghrebi Pasha Mesaoud sacked the town of Lulami. The location of this town is unknown but believed to be south of the town of Say in Niger.
