= Ishaq II =

Ishaq II may refer to:

- Ishaq II (Hafsid), amir of the Hafsid dynasty
- Askia Ishaq II, King of Songhay Empire
