= Askia Ishaq II =

Ruler of the Songhai Empire (c.1550–1592)

Ishaq II

Askia of the Songhai Empire
- Reign: 1588-1591
- Coronation: 10 April 1588
- Predecessor: Askia Muhammad Bani
- Successor: Askia Muhammad Gao
- Born: c. 1550; Gao
- Died: March/April 1592; Bilanga
- Issue: Albarka
Names
- Ishaq ibn Dawud ibn Muhammad al-Turi
- Dynasty: Askiya dynasty
- Father: Askia Daoud
- Mother: Fāṭima Buṣ

Askia Ishaq II, also known as Askia Isḥāq Zughrānī, was the ruler of the Songhai Empire from 1588 to 1591. He commanded the Songhai force at the Battle of Tondibi, where he was defeated by Saadian forces from the Western maghreb who subsequently destroyed the empire.

== Early life and rise to power ==
Ishaq was the son of Askia Daoud and a Zughrani concubine from the middle Niger region. He was the first son born to Daoud after his rise to power in 1549.

Ishaq came to power upon the death of his brother Askia Muhammad Bani, while another brother, the Balma'a (military governor of Kabara), was bearing down on Gao with a rebellious army. After discovering the body of the deceased Askia, eunuch courtiers conspired to have Benga-farma Maḥmūd b. Ismail take the crown, but another royal slave tipped off Ishaq, the oldest of the sons of Askia Daoud present that day. He and his supporters surrounded the conspirators, and he was proclaimed Askia on 10 April 1588.

Before engaging the rebel army, Ishaq lured away two nephews who had supported the Balma'a. When the battle came, around 20 April 1588, Ishaq's Tuareg cavalry proved decisive. The rebels were defeated, with the Balma'a fleeing first to Timbuktu and then Tindirma, where he was captured and killed.

== Reign ==
While Ishaq was victorious, the army had lost significant manpower and leadership as the new Askia purged dozens of rebellious leaders from the western provinces. During his three year reign, Ishaq continued to campaign, marching twice into the Gurma region south of the Niger River. His brutal purge of rebel leaders notwithstanding, he was reputed to be kind, honest, generous, and popular with the people of Gao.

Ishaq did not get the opportunity to restabilize the empire. A royal slave imprisoned at the remote but very valuable Taghaza salt mine escaped to Marrakesh, where he told the Sultan Ahmad I al-Mansur Saadi about the fractured and weakened Songhai. Al-Mansur dispatched a letter in December 1589 demanding the revenue from Taghaza; Ishaq responded with bluster, but it failed to dissuade the Moroccans from sending a powerful force of musketeers to invade the Songhai Empire.

== War with Saadians ==
The 4,000-man force under the Islamicized Spaniard Judar Pasha crossed the Sahara desert, arriving on the Niger on 28 February 1591. Though Ishaq assembled more than 40,000 soldiers to meet the Moroccans, his army fled the enemy's gunpowder weapons at the decisive Battle of Tondibi in March 1591. Ishaq had the capital of Gao evacuated, which Judar soon seized and looted, along with the trading centers of Timbuktu and Djenné. The Askia sued for peace, but in response al-Mansur sent reinforcements and replaced Judar with Pasha Maḥmūd, a more aggressive commander.

Pasha Maḥmūd defeated the Songhai again at the battle of Zanzan on 14 October 1591, forcing Ishaq to flee to Dendi, where he was soon deposed and sent into exile in Gurma. He attempted to find refuge in the town of Bilanga, one the towns he had campaigned against during his reign, and was killed in April 1592 by a vengeful mob.

== Character ==
He is described in the Tarikh al-fattash as being "noble and generous and openhanded, as well as handsome". An anonymous Spaniard in Marrakesh in 1591 confirmed this:

It is said that Isḥāq of Gao is a man of 45 years. Although black, he is truthful and faithful to his word, and has a very gentle nature, and many good qualities; he is well loved by his subjects. He is not depraved as are the Moors of Marrakesh and Fez, and has no other vices than those permitted by his religion

== See also ==
- Saadian invasion of the Songhai Empire
