= Chenachène =

- Village
- Location within Algeria
- Coordinates: 26°2′23″N 4°12′56″W
- Country: Algeria
- Province: Tindouf Province
- District: Tindouf District
- Commune: Tindouf
- Elevation: 380 m (1,250 ft)
- Time zone: UTC+1 (CET)

Chenachène (also written Chenachane) is an isolated village in the commune of Tindouf, in Tindouf Province, Algeria.

== Climate ==
Chenachène has a hyper-arid hot desert climate (Köppen BWh). It is one of the driest places on earth and the hottest during summer. The average high temperature in July is 48.3 °C (118.9 °F), which is 0.9°C higher than Furnace Creek, Death Valley, California and the highest on earth (Chenachène beats nearby Taghaza in Mali by 0.1°C, and Taoudenni, also in Mali, by 0.4°C).

Climate data for Chenachène
Month	Jan	Feb	Mar	Apr	May	Jun	Jul	Aug	Sep	Oct	Nov	Dec	Year
Mean daily maximum °C (°F)	23.0 (73.4)	26.6 (79.9)	30.1 (86.2)	35.8 (96.4)	39.4 (102.9)	44.5 (112.1)	48.3 (118.9)	46.7 (116.1)	42.0 (107.6)	35.1 (95.2)	28.1 (82.6)	22.4 (72.3)	35.2 (95.3)
Daily mean °C (°F)	14.7 (58.5)	17.7 (63.9)	21.7 (71.1)	26.2 (79.2)	29.9 (85.8)	34.6 (94.3)	38.7 (101.7)	37.6 (99.7)	33.6 (92.5)	26.9 (80.4)	20.5 (68.9)	15.0 (59.0)	26.4 (79.6)
Mean daily minimum °C (°F)	6.5 (43.7)	8.9 (48.0)	13.3 (55.9)	16.7 (62.1)	20.5 (68.9)	24.8 (76.6)	29.1 (84.4)	28.5 (83.3)	25.3 (77.5)	18.7 (65.7)	13.0 (55.4)	7.6 (45.7)	17.7 (63.9)
Average precipitation mm (inches)	0 (0)	1 (0.0)	0 (0)	0 (0)	0 (0)	0 (0)	0 (0)	2 (0.1)	2 (0.1)	1 (0.0)	2 (0.1)	0 (0)	8 (0.3)

== See also ==
- Furnace Creek
- Taghaza
- Taoudenni
- Tanezrouft
