= Jan Kieniewicz =

Polish historian (1938–2024)

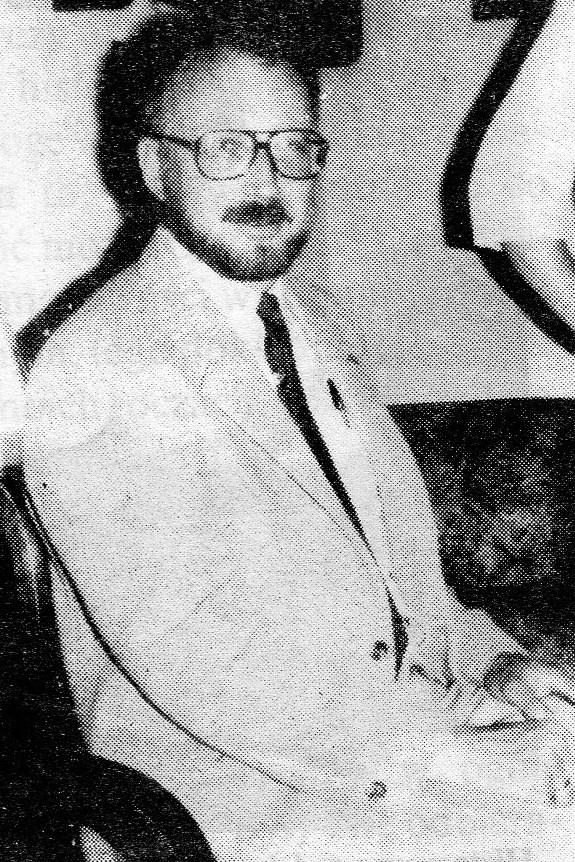

Jan Oskar Kieniewicz (7 August 1938 – 27 May 2024) was a Polish historian, diplomat and humanities professor. He specialised in the history of India (particularly pre-colonisation) and European, Spanish and Polish history. He was a member of the Collegium Invisibile and the jury for the KLIO Award.

== Life and career ==
Kieniewicz was born in Warsaw on 7 August 1938, to professor Stefan Kieniewicz. He graduated in history in 1960 and his doctorate in 1966, both from the University of Warsaw, where he also spent much of his academic career, serving as head of its Department of Spanish Studies (1975–1981) and deputy director of its Institute of History (1981–1988). He became a habilitated doctor in 1974 and was awarded the title of professor in the humanities in 1983, retiring as a full professor at the University of Warsaw.

Kieniewicz also served as Poland's ambassador to Spain (1990–1994) and as deputy director of the Instytutu Badań Interdyscyplinarnych Artes Liberales (1996–2008). After retiring he remained a lecturer at the University of Warsaw's Faculty of Liberal Arts. He was awarded the Knight's Cross of the Order of Polonia Restituta in 2005 and the Officer's Cross of the same order in 2013.

Kieniewicz died on 27 May 2024, at the age of 85.

== Selected works ==
- Portugalczycy w Azji: XV–XX wiek (1976)
- Od Bengalu do Bangladeszu (1976)
- Historia Indii (1980)
- Od ekspansji do dominacji. Próba teorii kolonializmu (1986)
- Spotkania Wschodu (1999)
- Historia Polski (1986, co-authored with Jerzy Holzer and Michał Tymowski)
- Historia Europy (1998, co-author)
- Wprowadzenie do historii cywilizacji Wschodu i Zachodu (2003)
- Cmentarz Bródnowski (2007, editing and scientific study)
- Wyraz na ustach zapomniany (2013)

== Bibliography ==
- (in Polish) "Prof. dr hab. Jan Kieniewicz". uw.edu.pl. Archived from the original on 2016-12-03.
- (in Polish) 'Jan Kieniewicz' on „Ludzie nauki” (OPI)
