= Stefan Kieniewicz =

Polish historian (1907–1992)

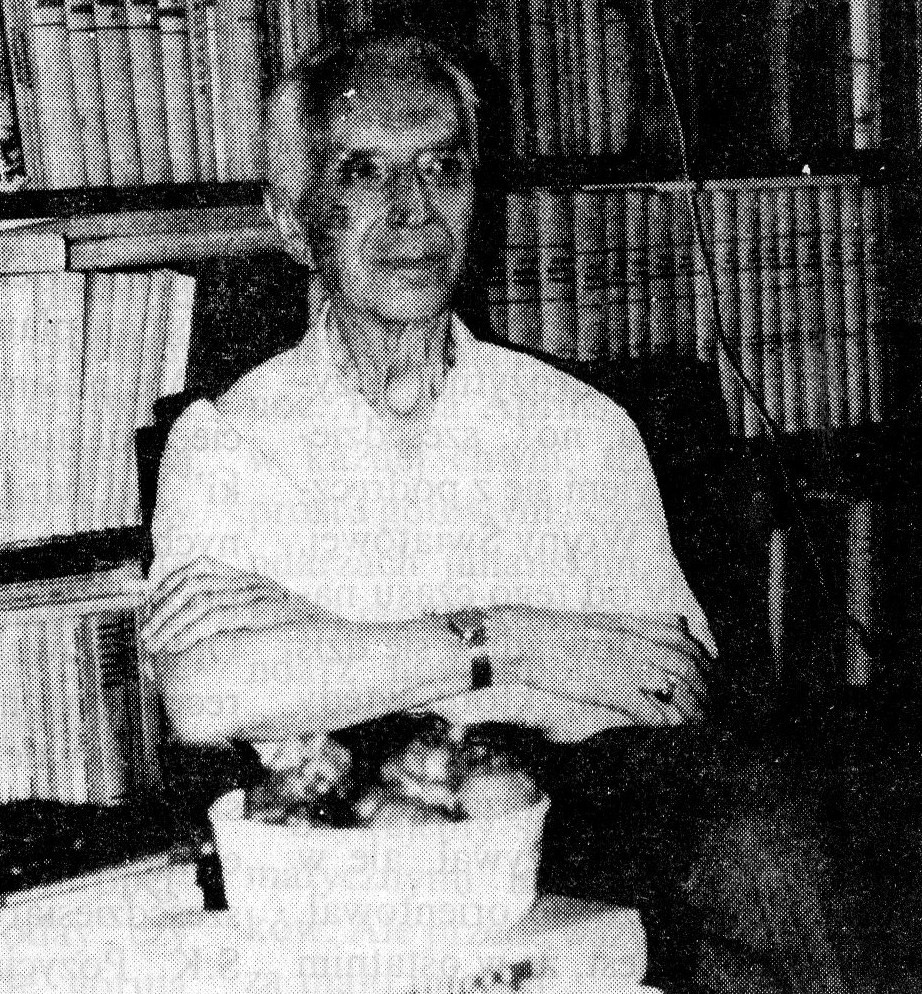
- Stefan Kieniewicz in 1980s
- Born: 20 September 1907; Dorashevichi
- Died: 2 May 1992 (aged 84); Konstancin-Jeziorna
- Occupation: Historian

Stefan Kieniewicz (20 September 1907 – 2 May 1992) was a Polish historian and university professor, notable for his works on the 19th-century history of Poland. During his work at various universities he became the tutor of several generations of Polish historians and his views on the last two centuries of Poland's history remain influential in modern scholarly works.

== Life ==
Stefan Kieniewicz was born on 20 September 1907 in his family's manor in the village of Dereszewicze in Polesie. In 1930 he graduated from the historical faculty of the Adam Mickiewicz University of Poznań, where he studied under tutorship of, among others, Marceli Handelsman and Adam Skałkowski, both being among the most notable historians of the epoch. In 1934 he passed his doctorate and started working as a historian at the Fiscal Archives in Warsaw. Among his pre-war works are a study on Polish society of Poznań during the Spring of Nations (published in 1935) and a biography of Adam Sapieha (published in 1939).

After the outbreak of World War II he remained in Warsaw, where he became one of the members of the Information and Propaganda Bureau of the Headquarters of Armia Krajowa. After the failure of the Warsaw Uprising of 1944 he was taken prisoner and sent to Dachau concentration camp, where he remained until the liberation. After the war he returned to Poland, where he took part in rebuilding the Warsaw University. After receiving habilitation in 1946 he became a deputy professor and since 1949 an extraordinary professor. In 1958 he became an ordinary professor. Between 1953 and 1968 he collaborated with the Historical Institute of the Polish Academy of Sciences (PAN), after which in 1970 he became a full member of the PAN. In 1976 he was also awarded with honorary membership of the Hungarian Academy of Sciences. Awarded with doctorate honoris causa of the Lublin University, Kieniewicz died on 2 May 1992 in Konstancin near Warsaw, and was buried at Powązki Cemetery.

His son, Jan Kieniewicz (born 1938), is an emeritus humanities professor, specialist in Iberian studies and former Polish ambassador to Spain.

== Works ==
- Społeczeństwo polskie w powstaniu poznańskim 1848 r. 1935.
- Adam Sapieha. 1939.
- Rosja w XIX wieku. 1948.
- Czyn polski w dobie Wiosny Ludów. 1948.
- Oblicze ideowe Wiosny Ludów. 1948.
- Konspiracje galicyjskie 1831–1845. 1950.
- Ruch chłopski w Galicji w 1846 r. 1951.
- Przemiany społeczne i gospodarcze w Królestwie Polskim (1815–1830). Wybór tekstów źródłowych. 1951.
- Legion Mickiewicza 1848–1849. 1957.
- Samotnik brukselski: Opowieść o Joachimie Lelewelu. 1960.
- Historia Polski 1795–1918. 1968.
- Powstanie styczniowe. 1972. ISBN 83-01-03652-4.
- Les chances de l’insurrection polonaise de 1863. Warszawa: PWN. 1973.
- Pomiędzy Stadionem a Goslarem. Sprawa włościańska w Galicji w 1848 r. 1980.
- Historyk a świadomość narodowa. 1982.
- Warszawa w powstaniu styczniowym. Warszawa. 1983. ISBN 83-214-0303-4.
- Dereszewicze 1863. 1986.

== See also ==
- List of Poles
