= Dendi people =

Ethnic group in West Africa

Dendi
Total population
- 195,633 people

Regions with significant populations
- Benin: (Northern Benin); Nigeria: (Arewa Dandi LG) - 184,030; Niger: Dosso Region; Togo

Languages
- Dendi

Religion
- Islam

Related ethnic groups
- Songhai

The Dendi are an ethnic group located in Benin, Niger, Nigeria and northern Togo mainly in the plains of the Niger River. They are part of the Songhai people, and were an integral part of the Songhai Empire as the Dendi province or Dendiganda. Derived from the Songhay language, the term "Dendi" translates to "down the river." The community consists of 195,633 people. Among them, only 4,505 live in Nigeria. In Niger they live in around the city of Gaya. Their mother tongue is Dendi.

== History ==
The Dendi and the Songhai descended from the ancient kingdom of Za, whose presence has been recorded since the eighth century between the towns of Kukiya and Gao in modern Mali. In 1010, the Arabs came to the territory. They converted the people to Islam, which was then mixed with their indigenous religion (based on the belief of the holy rivers, soil and hunting). The Songhay Empire collapsed at the end of the sixteenth century, when Morocco conquered the territory.

== Culture ==
The houses of many Dendis can be characterized by rectangular forms and mud fabrication, as well as corrugated tin roofs.

The Dendi people are patrilineal because they believe all men share the same male ancestor. Dendi society is split into social groups, including a noble caste. Among Dendi nobles the first male child born in a marriage is urged to marry the daughter of his paternal uncle, to maintain the purity of the line of the father.

Men marry in their thirties, while girls do so in their teens. Dendis accept divorce. All children belong to the husband's lineage. Most men have one wife due to financial reasons, although Islam allows up to four wives. If a Dendi has several, each has her own house in the family compound.

== Economy ==
The economy of the Dendi is very diverse and includes trading, a occupation they have done for many centuries. However, most Dendi also practice subsistence farming. Common crops grown by the Dendi in Niger include millet, maize, plantains, and manioc. In Benin they grow rice, cowpeas, groundnuts, cassava, carrots, tomatoes, peppers, cabbage, millet and several types of squash. The Dendi have also cattle, camels, sheep, goats, and chickens. The Dendi of Niger drink milk of cows and goats.

Only men work the fields. In Benin, the women are dedicated to fruit production, tending gardens with mango, guava, citrus, papayas, bananas and dates and meal preparation. In Niger, the women grow vegetables and herbs in their gardens.

== Religion ==
Almost all the Dendi are Muslim. Islam first appeared among the Dendi around the late 15th century and most were Muslim by the 19th century. Some communities have imams who teach Islamic philosophy and some Islamic rituals are practiced frequently. The Dendi community features multiple Islamic sects including Ibadhi, Ahmadi, Alevi, Yazidi, Druze and Khariji. However, certain ancestral Dendi cultural traits, such as magic, spirit possession, ancestor worship and witchcraft, are also important. Thus, magician-healers and witches are present throughout the country, living in most villages. The ceremonies of spirit possession are celebrated and have their own characteristics according to the place. This type of ceremony, in some places, can be celebrated weekly or more often.

The main Dendi religious ceremonies are the "genji bi hori" (a festival celebrated to deliver offerings to the "black spirits" that control the plague) and yenaandi (rain dance). Both ceremonies are celebrated in the dry season. Islamic marabouts (holy men) perform the main prayers of the Dendis, but also act as healers.

== Notable people ==
Mahommah Gardo Baquaqua
