= Askia Al-Hajj =

Ruler of the Songhai Empire from 1582 to 1586

Muhammad Al-Hajj
- Askia of the Songhai Empire
- Reign: 1582-1586
- Predecessor: Askia Daoud
- Successor: Askia Muhammad Bani
- Died: 1587; Tondibi
- Muhammad Al-Hajj ibn Dawud al-Turi
- Dynasty: Askiya dynasty
- Father: Askia Daoud
- Mother: Āmina/Mina Gāy Bardā

Askia Muhammad al-Hajj was the ruler of the Songhai Empire from 1582 to 1586.

== Rise to Power ==
Muhammad al-Hajj was the son of Askia Daoud and named after his grandfather Askia Mohammed I. Despite his name, he never performed the hajj. Upon his father's accession to the Askiyate in 1549 he was appointed Korey-farma, meaning 'Minister of the Whites.' This position was in charge of managing the Berbers and Tuareg people of the northern parts of the Empire, as well as an increasingly large and influential community of expatriate merchants in Gao and Timbuktu. Under his father, he also served as fari-mondio, in charge of tax collection, from 1579 to 1583.

Askia Daoud had intended that al-Hajj's older brother, Kurmina-fari Muhammad Benkan, succeed him. But when Daoud died in 1582, Muhammad Benkan had not yet arrived from Tindirma. Al-Hajj, being the oldest brother present, was elected Askia.

== Reign ==
Muhammad Benkan initially intended to oppose the succession, but was quickly abandoned by his troops and chose exile in Timbuktu before later being arrested. Al-Hajj appointed his brother al-Hadi as the new Kurmina-fari, but in February 1584 he also rebelled, was abandoned by his co-conspirators, and was arrested.

Askia Al-Hajj had a severe bowel ailment that prevented him from going on campaign. He exchanged gifts with the Sultan Ahmad al-Mansur, but Moroccan forces still unsuccessfully attacked Ouadane and briefly occupied the economically vital salt mine at Taghaza.

In December 1586, al-Hajj was deposed by his brothers and exiled to Tondibi, where he died soon after.
