= Dendi (province) =

Historic African state

- Status: Province of Songhai (1430s-1591) Sovereign State (1591-1901)
- Capital: Lulami
- Common languages: Dendi
- Religion: Islam
- Historical era: Songhai Empire
Preceded by	Succeeded by
Songhai Empire	Colony of Niger; French Sudan
- Today part of: Niger

The Dendi (or Dandi, Dendiganda) was a former province of the Songhai Empire. It survived the fall of the Empire as a kingdom until 1901, when it was conquered by France and incorporated into French West Africa. Its centers today are the cities of Gaya in Niger, Kamba in Nigeria and Malanville in Benin.

== Dendi Kingdom ==
Under the Songhai empire, Dendi had been the easternmost province, governed by the prestigious Dendi-fari ("governor of the eastern front"). Some members of the Askia dynasty and their followers fled here after being defeated by the invading Saadi dynasty of Morocco at the Battle of Tondibi and at another battle seven months later. There, they resisted Moroccan Invaders and maintained the tradition of the Songhai with the same Askia rulers and their newly established capital at Lulami. The first ruler, Askia Ishaq II was deposed by his brother Muhammad Gao, who was in turn murdered on the order of the Moroccan pasha. The Moroccans then appointed Sulayman as puppet king ruling the Niger between Djenné and Gao. South of Tillaberi the Songhai resistance against Morocco continued under Askia Nuh, a son of Askia Dawud. He established his capital at Lulami.

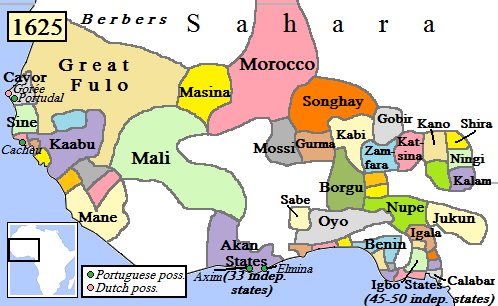
West Africa after the Moroccan invasion

=== Conflict with the Saadi dynasty ===
After the Moroccans had Askia Sulayman appointed as their puppet the pasha, Mahmud ibn Zarqun, attempted to conquer the remaining smaller Songhai kingdoms Which was now centred in south-western Niger. Askia Nuh resisted the invasion by a costly warfare lasting two years. In 1594 Mahmud was forced to discontinue the war and retreated, just to be killed in the same year by Dogon, with whom Nuh was probably allied. The new pasha called Mansur continued the war against the Songhai and again Nuh resorted to guerilla warfare. This situation lasted until 1599, when Nuh's followers became tired of the war and deposed him in favor of his brother Harun. In 1609, the city of Djenné revolted against the Saadi pashas with the support of the Songhai. The Saadi were eventually able to regain the city, but with a lack of support from their homeland, they soon abandoned the area, leaving it to Tuareg and Fulbe nomads.

In 1612, Askia al-Amin came to power. His short reign of six years was followed by the rule of Askiya Dawud. Dawud killed many people during his reign including relatives and members of the military. His brother, Isma'il, fled to Timbuktu and sought Saadi support to overthrow al-Amin. Isma'il returned to Songhai and deposed his brother in 1639. Upon attempting to send the foreign army back, he was deposed and replaced by a ruler that the pashas felt would be easier to deal with. This ruler was eventually removed by the Songhai people.

=== Decline ===
The Dendi Kingdom lasted for the next two and a half centuries, witnessing increasingly unstable reigns, coups and counter-coups. When France entered the region, the empire was defensively unprepared. In 1901, the French deposed the last askia of Dendi, ending Songhai's control of either Mali or Niger until independence.

Askia Rulers of Dendi (18th century – early 20th century)

- Askia Hanga (1700–1761)
- Askia Samsu Beri (1761–1779)
- Askia Hargani (1779–1793)
- Askia Fodi Mayrumfa (1793) (1st time)
- Askiak Samsu Keyna (1793–1798)
- Fodi Mayrumfa (2nd time)
- Askia Tomo (1805–1823)
- Askia Bassaru Missi Ize (1823–1842)
- Askia Bumi "Kodama Komi" (1842–1845)
- Askia Koyze Baba (1845–1864)
- Koyze Baba Baki (1864–1865)
- Askia Wankoy (1865–1868)
- Askia Bigo Farma (1868–1882)
- Askia Dauda (1882–1887)
- Askia Malla (1887–1901)

== Culture ==
The main ethnic groups in Dendi are the Tyenga, Zarma, Songhai proper, Hausa people, Bariba and the Fulbe. In the pre-colonial era, the Songhai, who migrated from the fallen Songhai empire, held political rule while the Tyenga, who had been the older residents, mainly derived their power from their practice of Bori (a pre-Islamic traditional cult). These two ethnic groups, the Songhai and the Tyenga, mixed to form a new distinct ethnic group, the Dendi people. They speak the Dendi Songhai dialect.

Like Birni-N'Konni and Dogondoutchi, Dendi was a center of the Bori obsession cult, which almost completely disappeared as a result of Islamization by the mid-1950s. Merchants who moved from other regions made this region in the border triangle an important trading center in the second half of the 20th century where agricultural products such as rice, millet and corn from other regions are traded.

== See also ==
- Askiya dynasty
- Songhai Empire
- List of Sunni Muslim dynasties

== Sources ==
- Worldstatesmen
- Africa and Slavery 1500–1800
