= Michał Tymowski =

Polish historian (born 1941)

Michał Tymowski (born in Warsaw, 21 November 1941) is a Polish historian, professor of the humanities and an academic at the University of Warsaw. He specialises in the history of Africa.

== Works ==
- Les domaines des princes du Songhay. Comparaison avec la grande propriété foncière en Europe au début de l'époque féodale (1970)
- Le développement et la régression chez les peuples de la boucle du Niger a l'époque précoloniale (1974)
- Samori – bohater Czarnej Afryki (1976)
- Dzieje Timbuktu (1979)
- Historia Mali (1979)
- Karabin i władza w Afryce XIX wieku: państwa i armie Samoriego i Kenedugu oraz ich analogie europejskie (1985)
- Historia Polski (1986) – razem z Jerzym Holzerem i Janem Kieniewiczem
- Sociétés sans Etat et sociétés a organisation étatique en Afrique Noire pré-coloniale (1990)
- Najkrótsza historia Polski (1993)
- Historia Afryki: do początku XIX wieku (1996) – redakcja
- Państwa Afryki przedkolonialnej (1999)
- Średniowiecze (1999)
- Człowiek i historia: podręcznik dla liceum ogólnokształcącego: kształcenie w zakresie rozszerzonym. Cz. 2, Czasy średniowiecza (2002)
- Europejczycy i Afrykanie. Wzajemne odkrycia i pierwsze kontakty (2017)

== Bibliography ==
- (in Polish) 'Prof. Michał Tymowski' on „Ludzie nauki” portalu Nauka Polska (OPI)
- (in Polish) Tomasz Wituch, Bogdan Stolarczyk, Studenci Instytutu Historycznego Uniwersytetu Warszawskiego 1945-2000, Wydawnictwo Arkadiusz Wingert i Przedsięwzięcie Galicja, Kraków 2010
- (in Polish) Szymon Brzeziński, Krzysztof Fudalej Pracownicy naukowo-dydaktyczni Instytutu Historii Uniwersytetu Warszawskiego 1930-2010. Słownik biograficzny, wyd. Neriton, Warszawa 2012
