= Askia Ishaq I =

Askiya Ishaq I
- Emperor of the Songhai Empire
- Reign: 1539 – 1549
- Predecessor: Askia Isma'il (ruled 1537–1539)
- Successor: Askiya Dawud (ruled 1549–1582 or 1583)
- Died: 1549 (died a natural death); Kukiya
- Issue: Abd al-Malik
- Dynasty: Askiya dynasty
- Father: Ashiya al-hajj Muhammad
- Mother: Kulthūm Barda

Askia Ishaq I, also known as Ishaq Ber (Ishaq the Great), was the ruler of the Songhai Empire from 1539 to 1549, elected Askia following the death of Askia Isma'il. He was the fifth ruler of the Askiya dynasty.

== Rise to Power ==
Ishaq was born the son of Askia Mohammad I and a Tuareg concubine from Dirma Kulthūm Barda.

When Askia Isma'il died on campaign, the leading men in the empire peacefully agreed that Ishaq would be the next ruler.

== Reign ==
Askia Ishaq was a ruthless and paranoid ruler, inspiring fear and anxiety among the Songhai people. Despite being a devout Muslim, he sent agents to Timbuktu on a regular basis to demand enormous sums of money from the merchants, which is against Islamic law. This damaged the economy of the empire and made him unpopular, thus gaining him many enemies. Askiya Ishaq I was completely ruthless as a ruler and executed any official whom he considered as a threat. The Tarikh al-Sudan gives this description: "If he imagined anyone was making the least move against the throne, he would, without exception, have him killed or banished. This was his consistent practice."

In the early 1540's, Askia Ishaq invaded Bendougou (modern-day Segou region), looking to root out Askia Muhammad Benkan, a predecessor who had taken refuge there. Benkan died during Ishaq's invasion of unknown causes. Soon thereafter he exiled a conspiratorial Kurmina-fari and replaced him with his half-brother Dawud, who later invaded the Mali Empire, briefly occupying the capital in 1545 and 1546.

After a request from the Moroccan sultan Mohammed al-Shaykh, to cede the salt mines of Taghaza, Ishaq I sent a group of 2000 mounted men to raid a market town in the Dara valley of southern Morocco with instructions to avoid killing anyone. This was intended as a show of strength.

Askiya Ishaq I died in the town of Kukiya and was buried there. He was succeeded by his brother Askiya Dawud.
