= Battle of Tondibi =

1591 battle during the Moroccan invasion of the Songhai Empire

Date	13 March 1591
Location	Tondibi, Mali
Result	Moroccan victory; Collapse of the Songhai Empire

Belligerents
Saadi Sultanate	Songhai Empire

Commanders and leaders
Judar Pasha	Askia Ishaq II

Strength
1,500 infantry equipped with Arquebus; 500 infantry equipped with bows, lances and swords 1,500 light cavalry 6 cannons	9,700–30,000 infantry (estimates); 12,500–18,000 cavalry (estimates); 80,000 soldiers in total (estimates); 1,000 cattle

Casualties and losses
Unknown	Unknown

The Battle of Tondibi was the decisive confrontation in the 16th-century invasion of the Songhai Empire by the army of the Saadi dynasty in Morocco. The Moroccan forces under Judar Pasha defeated the Songhai under Askia Ishaq II, guaranteeing the empire's downfall.

== Background ==
The Songhai had been the dominant force in Western Africa for more than a century, controlling the Western Sudan from the headwaters of the Senegal River to what is now Niger; however, a series of succession conflicts after the 1586 death of Askia Al-Hajj left the Empire in a weakened state.

Meanwhile, to the north, the Saadi Dynasty of Morocco was at the height of its power. In 1578, Morocco successfully repelled an invasion by Portugal at the Battle of Alcácer Quibir, forces decimating the large Portuguese army. However, the expense of the defences built to hold off the Portuguese was a large strain on Moroccan coffers, putting the kingdom on the verge of bankruptcy.

== Invasion ==
In search of new resources, Sultan Ahmad I al-Mansur Saadi turned his attention to the Songhai Empire, which he erroneously presumed had gold mines from which its wealth came. Though many of his advisors warned that it was illegal to wage war against another Muslim nation, the Sultan swept their objections aside. In October 1590, he dispatched a force under Judar Pasha, a Spanish eunuch who had been captured as a child.

The army travelled with a transport train of 8,000 camels, 1,000 packhorses, 1,000 stablemen, and 600 labourers; they also transported eight cannons. After a four-month journey, Judar reached the Niger river on February 28th 1591. His forces captured, plundered, and razed the salt mines at Taghaza. The Moroccans then advanced on the Songhai capital of Gao.

== Forces ==
=== Moroccan ===
Judar Pasha commanded ten other qā’ids and two lieutenants, most of whom were, like him, converts from Christianity. The army consisted of 1,500 light cavalry and 2,500 infantry, many of whom were equipped with arquebuses. Half of the infantry were also converts, while the other half were émigrés from the former Emirate of Granada.

=== Songhai ===
Estimates of the Songhai force range from 18,000 cavalry and 9,700 foot soldiers (according to the Tarikh al-fattash), to 12,500 cavalry and 30,000 infantry, up to 80,000 soldiers in total. In any case, they outnumbered their opponents. Though the Songhai had a powerful cavalry, they lacked the Moroccans' gunpowder weapons, which would turn the tide of the battle.

== Battle ==
On 13 March 1591, the armies met at a place called Tankondibogho, near Tondibi, just north of Gao.

The Songhai planned to send a stampede of 1,000 cattle to break down the Moroccan lines and to cover their infantry (who lacked gunpowder weapons). The cattle charge was repelled by the noise of gunfire and the sound of cannons, which caused the cattle to stampede back towards Songhai lines. The Songhai infantry continued to pursue the Moroccan army as planned but were repelled by Moroccan arquebuses. The Songhai cavalry then charged at the Moroccan lines. After an initial cavalry skirmish, Judar maneuvered his arquebusiers into place and opened fire with both arquebuses and cannons. The remaining Songhai cavalry fled the field or were massacred by Moroccan gunfire. At last, only the rearguard remained, in hand-to-hand combat against the Moroccans, until they were killed.

The battle took only around two hours. The Tarikh al-Sudan records that some Songhai soldiers sat on their shields rather than flee, and were killed in cold blood by the victorious Moroccans.

== Consequences ==
Judar Pasha continued onto Gao and sacked the city, whose residents had already evacuated, but finding little in the way of riches soon moved on to the richer trading centers of Timbuktu and Djenné. The looting of the three cities marked the end of the Songhai Empire as an effective force in the region; however, Morocco proved likewise unable to assert firm control over the area due to the vastness of the Songhai Empire and difficulties of communication and resupply across the Saharan trade routes, and a decade of sporadic fighting began. The area eventually splintered into dozens of smaller kingdoms, and the Songhai themselves moved east to the only surviving province of Dendi and continued the Songhai tradition for the next two and a half centuries.
