= Judar Pasha =

Spanish-Moroccan military leader (d. 1606)

- Born: Cuevas del Almanzora, Crown of Castile
- Died: 1606; Marrakesh
- Military career
- Allegiance: Morocco
- Conflicts: Battle of Tondibi

Judar Pasha (Arabic: جؤذر باشا) was a Spanish-Moroccan military leader under the Saadian sultan Ahmad al-Mansur in the late 16th century. He led the Saadian army in the conquest of the Songhai Empire.

Born as Diego de Guevara in Cuevas del Almanzora, Castile, Judar had been captured by Muslim slave-raiders as a young boy. His captors castrated him. As a young boy, he joined the service of Moroccan Sultan Ahmad al-Mansur, who had many other eunuch officers. Judar was often described by reference to his blue eyes.

== Battles ==
In 1590, Ahmad al-Mansur made Judar a pasha and appointed him the head of an invasion force against the Songhai Empire of what is now Mali. In October of that year, Judar set out from Marrakesh with a force of 1,500 light cavalry and 2,500 arquebusiers and light infantry. Some of these men were Spaniards from Andalusia and some were "Renegats" (probably Christians from Southern Europe). He also carried eight English cannons in his supply train, and assembled eighty Christian bodyguards for his personal detail.

After an arduous crossing of the Sahara desert, Judar razed the desert salt mines of Taghaza and advanced on the Songhai capital of Gao.

Meanwhile, Songhai ruler Askia Ishaq II assembled a force of more than 40,000 men and moved north against the Moroccans; the two armies met at Tondibi in March 1591. Despite their far inferior numbers, the Moroccan gunpowder weapons easily carried the day, resulting in a rout of the Songhai troops. Ishaq offered slaves and gold if Judar would retreat; Judar refused the offer.

Judar sacked Gao and then moved on to the trading centers of Djenné and Timbuktu. He reached Timbuktu in April 1591, carrying a letter from the Sultan al-Mansur demanding their cooperation.

== Aftermath ==
According to Martin Meredith: "To quell resistance in Timbuktu, the Moroccans sent leading scholars to Marrakesh in chains. The wealth of Timbuktu, Gao, and Jenne was also stripped. Huge quantities of gold dust were shipped across the desert. When Judar Pasha returned to Morocco in 1599, his caravan included thirty camel-loads of gold valued by an English merchant at £600,000."

Judar was demoted to governor because he advocated for making Timbuktu the new capital, rather than Gao, as Sultan al-Mansur wished.

Despite Judar's gains, sporadic battles continued with the Songhai army, leading to his replacement several years after his victory.

== Death ==
Judar was executed in December 1606 on the orders of Mulay Abdallah, son of Mullay al-Shaykh, in the course of struggles over the Moroccan throne. This was mainly set up by the Battle of Tondibi.

== See also ==
- Tarikh al-fattash, a West African chronicle written in the late 17th century
