= Askia Isma'il =

Ismai'l
- Askia
- Predecessor: Askia Benkan (1531–1537)
- Successor: Askia Ishaq I (1539–1549)
- Born: c. 1510
- Died: December 1539
- Ismai'l ibn Mohammed al-Turi
- Dynasty: Askia dynasty
- Father: Askia Mohammad I
- Mother: Maryum Daabu
- Religion: Islam

Askia Ismail was the sixth ruler of the Songhai Empire from 1537 – 1539, and fourth from the Askia dynasty. He was the son of Askia Mohammad I, the founder of the Askia dynasty, and Maryam Daabu, a member of the Malian royal family captured in 1501.

== Dynastic struggles ==
Ismail, a younger son, joined an abortive rebellion against his brother Musa, and was sheltered by the Maghsharen-koi, the leader of the Tuareg community of Timbuktu, in the aftermath.

He was recalled to court by Askia Mohammed Benkan, given the king's sister as a wife, and made to swear a public loyalty oath. Despite this, he plotted with his father, imprisoned on an island in the Niger River, to regain power. The conspiracy came to fruition in April 1537 when Benkan was encamped at a village called Mansur, site of the murder of his own predecessor Musa. Benkan’s captains turned against him and he was deposed by the Dendi-fari, who then proclaimed Ismail as Askia.

== Reign ==
Ismail's reign began inauspiciously, with a heart attack on his coronation day. In June 1537 he brought his father back from exile and was crowned again as khalifa. He campaigned against Bakabula in Gurma. He gave charge of the cavalry to Kurmina-fari Hammad and instructed them to chase and engage Bakabula until Ismail arrived. In the ensuing battle they lost over 900 horsemen. However they succeeded in killing Bakabula and were able to take a large amount of booty. Shortly afterwards, in December 1539, Ismail died.

== See also ==
- Tarikh al-fattash – Chronicle giving the history of the Songhay Empire
- Tarikh al-Sudan – Chronicle giving the history of the Songhay Empire
