= Kabara, Mali =

Kabara
- Town
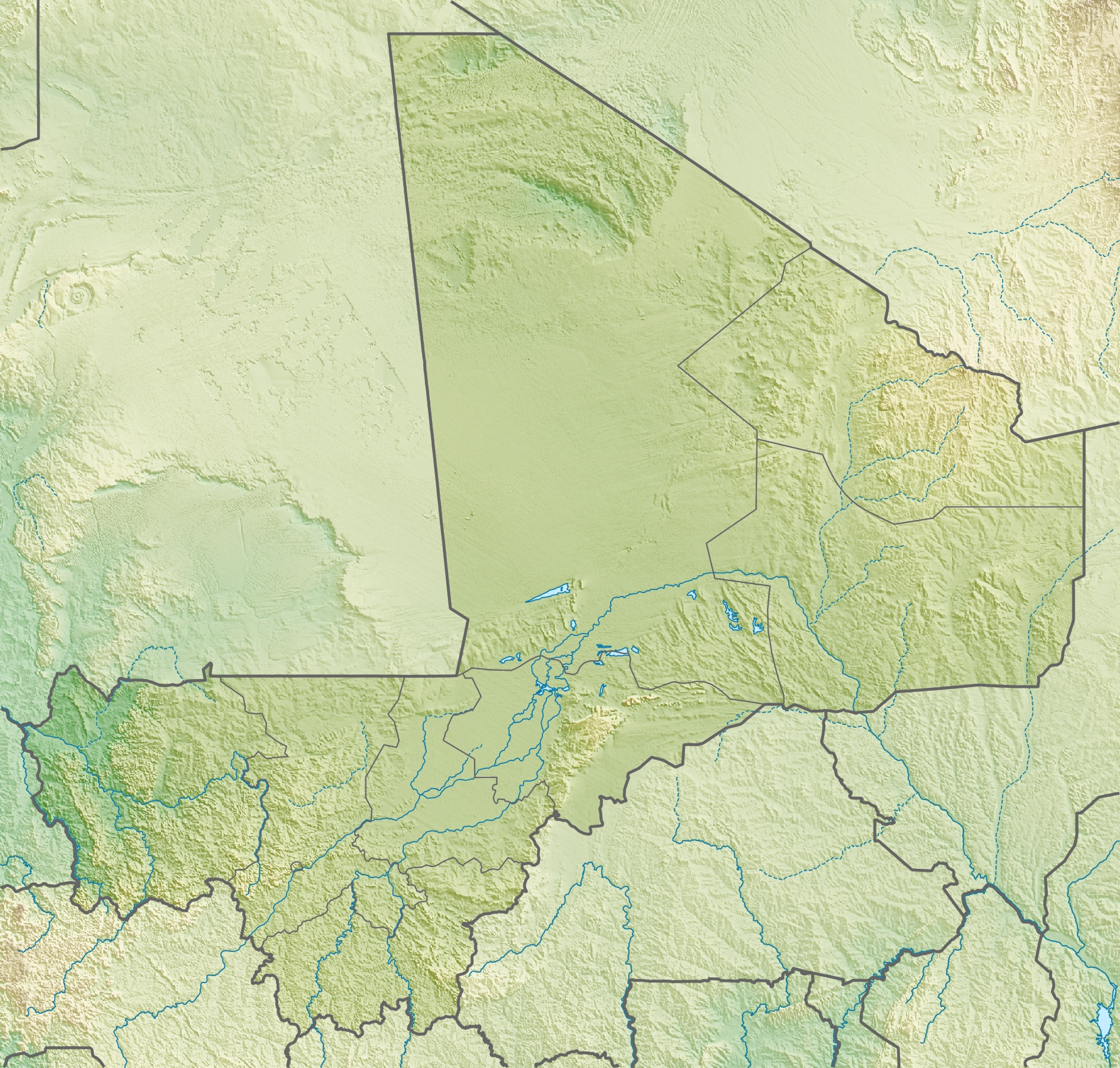
- Kabara
- Coordinates: 16.70695°N 2.9853°W
- Country: Mali
- Region: Tombouctou Region
- Cercle: Timbuktu Cercle
- Time zone: UTC+0 (GMT)

Kabara is a small town in Mali on the Niger River, the port for Timbuktu. It is 8 km (5 mi) to the south of Timbuktu and is connected to an arm of the Niger River by a 3 km (2 mi) canal. The town has at times in the past been linked to Timbuktu by an extension of the canal. However, silting and lower water levels in recent years have made the extension canal unusable and the Kabara port usable only during the high water seasons.

== Canals ==
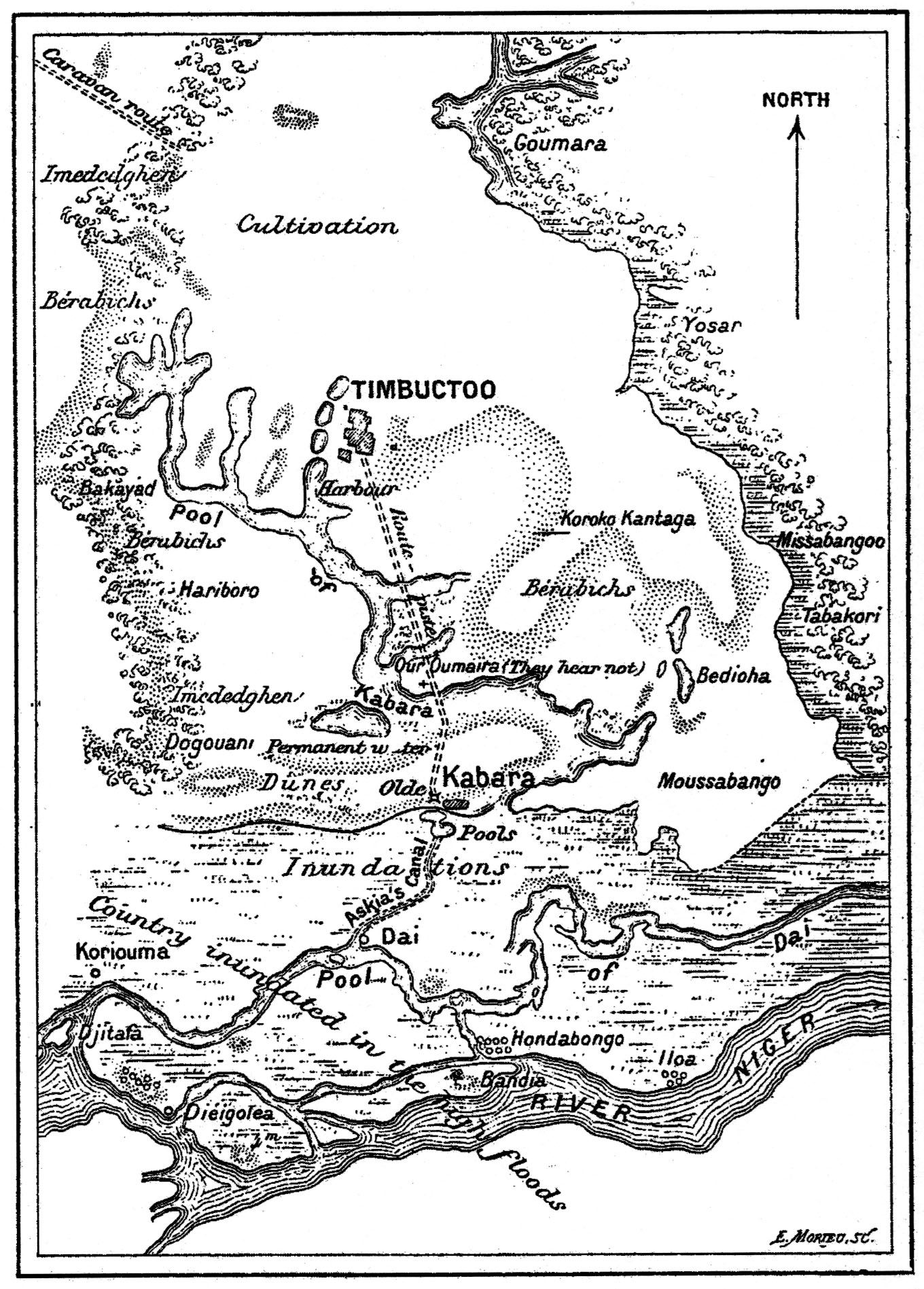
Kabara-Timbuktu region (1896)

In the past, the area flooded by the Niger was more extensive than today. In years with high rainfall the floodwater would reach the western outskirts of Timbuktu itself. The Koriomé canal from Daï to Kabara was dug by the emperor Soni Ali Ber when he captured Timbuktu in 1468. An extension known as the "Hippopotamus Canal" was later excavated from Kabara up to Timbuktu. A small navigable waterway to the west of Timbuktu is shown on the maps published by Heinrich Barth in 1857 and Félix Dubois in 1896.

Between 1917 and 1921 the French used slave labour to again dig a narrow canal linking Timbuktu with Kabara. In 1929 the Kabara harbour was a circle of water surrounded by sand at the head of a canal running up from the Niger, used only during the high water season. A shallow canal meandered up from Kabara to Timbuktu, and was used when the Niger was in flood to transport goods to the city. The local people would drink its unfiltered water and become sick from guinea-worm. Kabara was also connected to Timbuktu by a broad sandy track, with two fords over the canal.

From the 1970s prolonged drought caused a drop in the water level of the Niger River, and the canals no longer filled. The canal up to Timbuktu became heavily silted and unusable. A Libyan-financed clearance project was launched in August 2006. The newly excavated canal extended about 19 kilometres (12 mi) from Daï to Timbuktu via Kabara. The 14.3 kilometres (8.9 mi) long and 7 to 12 metres (23 to 39 ft) wide section from Kabara to Timbuktu was reopened in April 2007. The canal was also expected to be used to water animals and irrigate market gardens. Problems included steep sides and lack of easy access to the water, lack of footbridges for those wanting to cross it, seasonal drying up and health issues with the water basin in Timbuktu. Without a maintenance plan the canal could again be filled with sand from the surrounding dunes.

As of 2009 the channel from the Niger to Kabara was normally unnavigable in the low water months of September to December. Boats were diverted to Korioumé.

== History ==
In 1353 the Moroccan traveler Ibn Battuta made the first recorded visit to Timbuktu and Kabara when returning from a stay in the capital of the Mali Empire. Ibn Battuta thought the Niger was the upper part of the Nile. It is probable that by "Kabara" he meant Lake Débo, further upstream, which used to be called Kabara. He wrote,

Then we went on from Zaghari and arrived at the great river, the Nile. On it is the town of Karsakhu. The Nile descends from it to Kabara, then to Zagha. Kabara and Zagha have two sultans who give obedience to the king of Malli. And the people of Zagha are old in Islam, they are religious and seekers after knowledge. Then the Nile comes down from Zagha to Tunbuktu [Timbuktu], then to Kawkaw [Gao], the two places we shall mention below. Then it comes to the town of Muli, which is the land of the Limiyyun and is the last county of Malli".

Kabara had a customs inspector who collected a large part of Timbuktu's revenue from tax on imports from merchant cities on the Niger. Under the Songhai Empire around the end of the 15th century Kabara was governed by two officials. The Balama was head of the military and the Kabara-farma collected customs duties. The Kabara-farma collected gharama, a traditional levy, while it seems that another official in Timbuktu, the Tusur-mondio, collected the Islamic zakat tax.

The Granada-born Berber Leo Africanus visited Timbuktu and Songay some time between 1506 and 1510. He wrote,

Kabara is a large town which looks like an unwalled village. It is twelve miles from Timbuktu, on the Niger. It is from there that merchants load merchandise to go to Jenne and Mali. The houses and inhabitants are like those that we have just spoken of. One finds there blacks of different races, because it is the port to which they come from different regions with their canoes. The king of Timbuktu has sent a lieutenant there to facilitate royal audiences for the population, and to spare himself a journey of twelve miles. At the time when I was in Kabara this lieutenant was a relative of the king called Abu Bakr and surnamed Pargama. He was an extremely black man, though of great value because of his intelligence, and he was very just. What are very injurious here are the frequent illnesses caused by the large quantities of food that are consumed—fish, milk, butter. and meat, all mixed together. About half of the provisions to be found at Timbuktu come from Kabara.

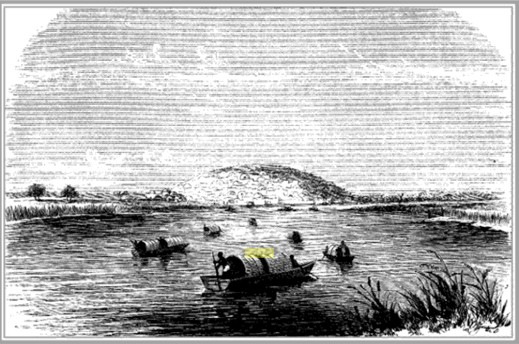
Kabara by Heinrich Barth (1853)

Mungo Park reached Kabara in 1805, but was not allowed to continue up the channel to Timbuktu. Gordon Laing reached Timbuktu in 1826, but was killed by Tuareg when he tried to leave. In 1828 René Caillié was the first European to visit the city and return alive. Heinrich Barth visited Kabara in 1853. The canal was so shallow that his boat's passengers had to disembark and the boat was dragged on with difficulty by the boatmen. Higher up the channel widened and led to a fairly large circular basin where seven good-sized boats were lying in front of the town, which was on the slope of a sandy hill. He revisited Kabara after the rains in October 1853, where he found all the fields overgrown with watermelons, a large part of the local economy. He was given hospitality by the harbour inspector, 'Abd el Kasim, a "cheerful old man ... of supposed sherif origin.".

Alfred Diban, father of the Burkinabe historian and politician Joseph Ki-Zerbo, was born in the second half of the 19th century in what is now western Burkina Faso. As a young man he was captured and made a slave. He was taken to Mopti, then to Sofara to the north of Djenné, and then to the Kabara slave market. He was traded for salt at Kabara and then transported into the desert. He eventually escaped from captivity and became a servant of the White Fathers, French Catholic missionaries, at their Ségou mission.

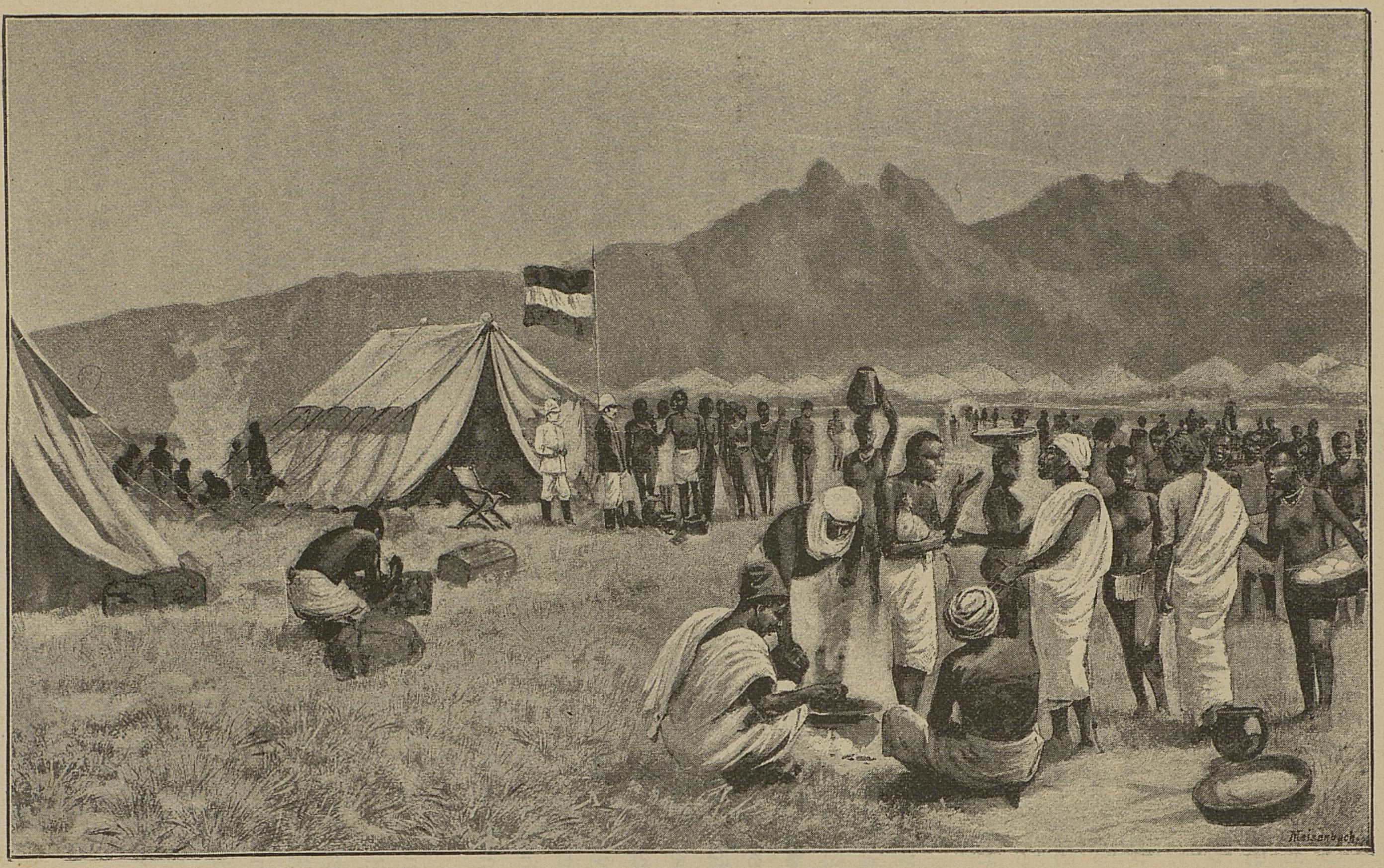
"In the camp before Kabara." (Emin Pasha expedition, before 1891)

In December 1893 Eugène Bonnier, commander in chief of French Sudan, launched an expedition to capture Timbuktu. Bonnier's force consisted of 204 Senegalese tirailleurs, 13 French officers and 9 non-commissioned officers. They had two eight-millimeter cannons, and travelled down the Niger in a small flotilla of canoes. Lieutenant H. Boiteux preceded the force with two gunboats. Rather than wait for Bonnier at Mopti as ordered, Boiteux continued with the gunboats to Kabara. Boiteux reached the port on 28 December 1893, and walked into Timbuktu with four Europeans and some African sailors without incident. In Boiteux's absence a force of Tuareg attacked the gunboats at Kabara and killed 17 of the men.

On 30 April 1895 the White Fathers missionaries Augustin Hacquard and Father Dupuis took a boat down the Niger to Kabara, which they reached on 21 May 1895. They quickly established a mission where Hacquard ran the pharmacy and Dupuis taught about 15 children. The mission did not last long. Hacquard was invited by Émile Auguste Léon Hourst^{(fr)}, commander of the French flotilla of the Niger, on a mission to investigate the hydrology of the river. The mission left Kabara on 22 January 1896 heading downstream towards what is now Nigeria.

The 1911 Encyclopædia Britannica said of the town, "From the south come cereals, gold, wax, ivory and coarse native cotton goods, now brought to Kabara (the port of Timbuktu) by steamers plying on the upper Niger... It is proposed to connect the city with the Niger by a canal". In 1929 Kabara was in decline, as was Timbuktu. Although the port was still as busy as before, there was less demand for the calabashes, pottery and garden produce grown by the inhabitants.

== Sources ==
- Barth, Heinrich (1859), Travels and discoveries in North and Central Africa: Being a journal of an expedition undertaken under the auspices of H.B.M.'s government, in the years 1849-1855, Harper & Brothers
- Coulibaly, Be (12 January 2011), "Canal de Daye à Tombouctou: la sécurité des riverains", Journal l'Essor, Primature: République du Mali
- Développement régional: le fleuve est de rétour à Tombouctou, Présidence de la République du Mali, 3 December 2007, archived from the original on 1 October 2011
- Dubois, Felix (1896), Timbuctoo the mysterious, White, Diana (trans.), New York: Longmans, hdl:2027/mdp.39015008010343.
- Fleming, Fergus (2007-12-01), The Sword and the Cross: Two Men and an Empire of Sand, Grove/Atlantic, Incorporated, ISBN 978-0-8021-9752-8
- Gomez, Michael A. (1990), "Timbuktu under Imperial Songhay: A Reconsideration of Autonomy", The Journal of African History, 31 (1), Cambridge University Press: 5–24, doi:10.1017/S0021853700024750, JSTOR 182798
- Hacquard, Augustin (1900), Monographie de Tombouctou, Paris: Société des études coloniales & maritimes. Also available from Gallica.
- Hubbell, Andrew (2001), "A View of the Slave Trade from the Margin: Souroudougou in the Late Nineteenth-Century Slave Trade of the Niger Bend", The Journal of African History, 42 (1), Cambridge University Press: 25–47, doi:10.1017/S0021853700007805, JSTOR 3647214, S2CID 54975774
- Hunwick, John O. (2003-01-01), Timbuktu and the Songhay Empire: Al-Saʿdi's Taʾrīkh Al-Sūdān Down to 1613, and Other Contemporary Documents, BRILL, ISBN 90-04-12822-0
- Jones, Jim (1999), Rapports Économiques du Cercle de Tombouctou, 1922–1945: Archives Nationales du Mali, Fonds Recents (Series 1Q362), West Chester University, Pennsylvania
- Lancement des travaux du Canal de Tombouctou : la mamelle nourricière redonne vie et espoir à la 'Cité mystérieuse', Afribone, 14 August 2006
- Levtzion, Nehemia; Hopkins, John F. P., eds. (2000), Corpus of Early Arabic Sources for West Africa, New York: Marcus Weiner Press, p. 299, ISBN 1-55876-241-8
- Massing, Andreas W. (2000), "The Wangara, an Old Soninke Diaspora in West Africa? (Les Wangara, une vieille diaspora soninke d'Afrique de l'Ouest?)", Cahiers d'Études Africaines, 40 (Cahier 158), EHESS: 281–308, doi:10.4000/etudesafricaines.175, JSTOR 4393041
- Porch, Douglas (2005-06-22), The Conquest of the Sahara: A History, Farrar, Straus and Giroux, ISBN 978-1-4299-2209-8
- Scott, Leonard T. (October 1929), "The Saura and Saharan Oases; And the Niger from Timbuktu to Jebba", The Geographical Journal, 74 (4), geographicalj: 323–337, doi:10.2307/1784249, JSTOR 1784249
- Shorter, Aylward (2011-12-05), Les Pères Blancs au temps de la conquête coloniale. Histoire des Missionnaires d'Afrique 1892-1914 (in French), KARTHALA Editions, ISBN 978-2-8111-5003-7
- Chisholm, Hugh, ed. (1911), "Timbuktu" , Encyclopædia Britannica, vol. 26 (11th ed.), Cambridge University Press, p. 981–982
- Vanrenterghem, Joseph (February 2005), MONSEIGNEUR AUGUSTIN HACQUARD (in French), Bry-sur-Marne: Pères Blancs
- Velton, Ross (2009), Mali: The Bradt Safari Guide, Bradt Travel Guides, ISBN 978-1-84162-218-7
- Villiers, Marq De; Hirtle, Sheila (2012-11-13), Timbuktu: The Sahara's Fabled City of Gold, McClelland & Stewart, ISBN 978-1-55199-277-8
