= Askia Daoud =

Dawud
- Askia of the Songhai Empire
- Reign: 1549 – 1582
- Predecessor: Askiya Ishaq I (ruled 1539–1549)
- Successor: Askiya Muhammad Al-Hajj (ruled 1582–1586)
- Died: 1582 (died a natural death); Tondibi
- Burial: Gao
- Issue: 333 or "at least 61"
- Dawud ibn Muhammad al-Turi
- Dynasty: Askiya dynasty
- Father: Askia Mohammad (ruled 1493–1528)
- Mother: Sana bint Fari-koi, or Sana Fariu

Askia Daoud (also Askia Dāwūd, Askiya Dawud) was the ruler of the Songhai Empire from 1549 to 1582. His rule saw the empire rise to a peak of peace and prosperity following a series of succession disputes and short reigns.

== Background and rise to power ==
Dawud was one of many sons of Askia Muhammad Ture, the first ruler of the Askia dynasty. Under his rule, the Songhai economy thrived and developed a profoundly Islamized society, with the government promoting trade, education, and literacy. Dawud and his brothers received a good Islamic education. Beginning with his father's deposition in 1528, the Songhai empire was shaken by a series of succession disputes until his brother Askia Ishaq I was peacefully elected Askia in 1539. Dawud was appointed Kurmina-fari, a very powerful position ruling over the western half of the empire. When Askia Ishaq I was on his deathbed in 1549, close allies summoned Dawud from Tindirma so that he could be in Gao as the moment of succession. There was only one other claimant, who was supposedly killed by the intercession of a Muslim sorcerer.

== Reign ==
Immediately after taking the throne, Dawud placed his sons in positions of power in the empire, sidelining his half-brothers, sons of Askia Muhammad.

=== Military campaigns ===
Daoud continued to expand the empire, but less aggressively than some of his predecessors. He reorganized the army and led at least 20 military campaigns, most of them successful, projecting Songhai power throughout the region and bringing massive quantities of booty and slaves back to Gao. These included attacks against the Mossi in 1549 and 1561-2, Borgu in 1558-9 and 1563, and the Mali Empire in 1550 and 1558. The 1558 attack on Mali concluded with a marriage between Daoud and the Mansa's daughter. He also brought large numbers of caste artisans from Mali to Gao.

Daoud's son Mohammad Bonkana and the Huku-kuri-koi (palace vizier) Yāsī led a series of campaigns against the Dogon people of the Bandiagara Escarpment which re-established some limited Songhai authority there that had weakened since Askia Muhammad's time.

The Songhai army under Daoud failed to modernize by adopting firearms, and relied on spears, arrows and guerrilla warfare.

=== Domestic policy ===
Stability, security and religion were some of the main focuses for the Askia. Daoud used strategic marriages to promote loyalty and unity, both political and religious, on the part of vassal chiefs, religious leaders, and the merchants. He established branches of the government treasury in the provinces as well as public libraries to promote literacy and Islamic education. He also refurbished numerous mosques, notably the all three constituent mosques of the University of Timbuktu.

The omnipresence and importance of slavery in the Songhai empire reached new heights under Askia Daoud. He personally owned dozens of massive plantations throughout the empire, a significant expansion of similar earlier systems. These were worked and managed by slaves. The managers, while still technically property of the Askia, often became massively wealthy and influential themselves. His military reforms increased central control over soldiers as well, turning them into quasi-slaves of the Askia.

=== Relations with Morocco ===
In 1556–1557 troops of Mulay Muhammad al-Shaykh, the sultan of Marrakesh, captured the extremely lucrative and economically important salt mines of Taghaza but then withdrew. Soon after his accession in 1578 Sultan Ahmad I al-Mansur of Morocco demanded the tax revenues from the salt mines. Askia Daoud responded by sending a large quantity of gold as a gift. The generosity amazed al-Mansur, and relations improved for a time, but the bribe signaled weakness.

=== Death and succession ===
Askia Daoud died in Tondibi, on one of his numerous estates, in 1582. His body was brought downriver to Gao for burial. After his death, succession disputes among his sons would severely weaken the empire. This, along with the disparity in arms, would ultimately prove Songhai's undoing in 1591 when the empire was finally conquered by the Moroccan forces.

== Personality ==
Dawud is described as an eloquent and magnanimous leader who was feared and respected but could also be a practical joker. He was renowned for his devotion to Islam. He was well-versed in Islamic law and memorized the Quran, and he respected and donated generously to Islamic scholars in Timbuktu. Nevertheless, pre-Islamic beliefs remained influential in Gao and other weakly Islamized parts of the empire.
