= Jean-Pierre Olivier de Sardan =

French-Nigerien anthropologist

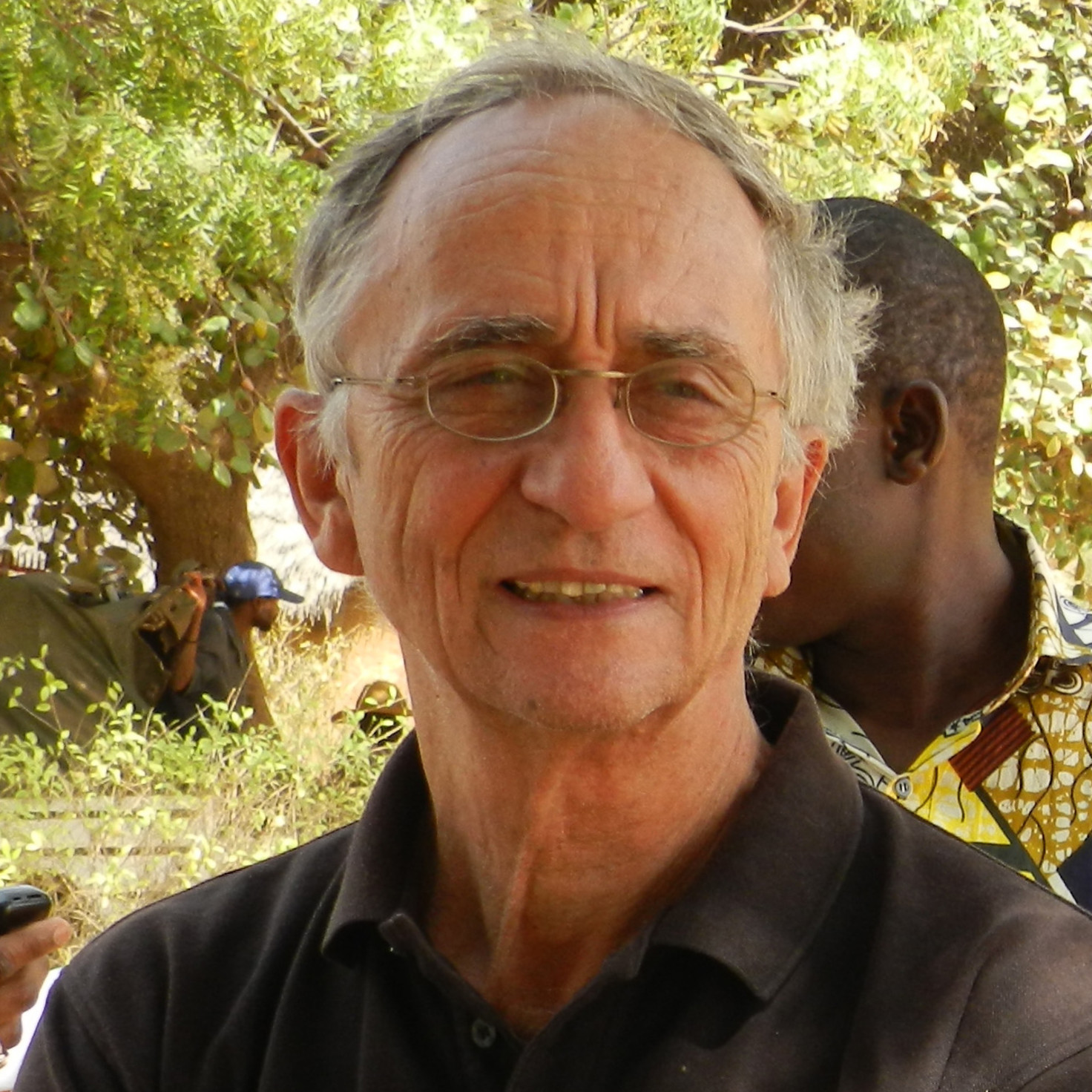
Olivier de Sardan in 2005

Jean-Pierre Olivier de Sardan (born July 11, 1941) is a French-Nigerien anthropologist. He is Emeritus Professor of Anthropology at the École des Hautes Études en Sciences Sociales in Marseille. He is also Emeritus Director of Research at the Centre National de la Recherche Scientifique in Paris and associate professor at Abdou Moumouni University in Niamey where he founded the master of socio-anthropology of health.

== Background ==
Olivier de Sardan was born in Languedoc on July 11, 1941. He studied political science and anthropology in France during the late 1950s, gaining a Diploma at the Institut d’Études Politiques de Paris (Sciences Po, 1961), Licence in Sociology from the Sorbonne (1963), and in 1967 his PhD (Doctorat de 3e cycle) in anthropology (ethnologie) supervised by R. Bastide. His Doctorat d’état was directed by Jean Rouch, the jury being chaired by Georges Balandier, and awarded in 1982. He was a leading activist against the Vietnam War, and participated in the May 1968 demonstrations in France.

For his doctoral work, he studied social change among the Wogo people in Niger, after first being recruited by Jean Rouch to conduct fieldwork with this group over a year in 1965. Over time his close observations of the Songhay-Zarma people have informed other projects, on more general topics, but all grounded in empirical researches in Africa: anthropology of development, medical anthropology, anthropology of bureaucracies, and, more generally, an anthropology of public actions and of the delivery of public and collective goods and services in Africa. He was a pioneer in the use of the anthropological method for the study of public policy and development aid in Africa. Known as an unconventional anthropologist, he had many collaborations with sociologists, historians or political scientists, and has produced innovative concepts such as "local modes of governance" and "practical norms".

He helped found, and was first President of, APAD - the Association Euro-Africaine pour l’Anthropologie du Changement social et du Développement and its journal. He established LASDEL in Niamey (Laboratoire d’études et de recherches sur les dynamiques sociales et le développement local). He obtained citizenship of Niger in 1999.

== Research contributions ==
Olivier de Sardan's first fieldwork was a classic anthropological investigation of a particular society, the Wogo along the banks and islands of the Niger River in Western Niger. Several later books describe the language and culture of the broader Songhay-Zarma populations of this region, including their therapeutic practices and former slavery relations. He and the visual anthropologist Jean Rouch are probably the foremost ethnographers of western Niger.

Olivier de Sardan has also made significant contributions to the understanding of social change and development on African societies, through empirical observation in Niger, Benin, Mali and other countries in Africa (but also including the Lozère region in France). After fifteen years he moved away from classic ethnographic description of small scale society to observe how modernity and western influences are incorporated into, and subverted by, African societies - particularly through public and collective services delivery, and by development aid. In his 1995 book Anthropology and Development (Olivier de Sardan, 1995, English version 2005) he significantly enhanced the field of anthropology of development, advocating for a "fundamental" and non-normative anthropology of development (and not only an "applied" one), being attentive to the drifts, unintended effects and implementations gaps of development projects, describing the various perceptions and logics of development 'actors' and stakeholders in Africa and how they related to existing socio-political structures. The techniques of international development aid, especially "participation", came under scrutiny and he set out some of the key features of anthropological investigation of development impacts. A further volume (2000) was the first study of development aid "brokers" situated between local societies and international aid agencies (Bierschenk, Chauveau & Olivier de Sardan, 2000).

More recent work concern local powers and decentralization in the context of stratified societies in Africa (Olivier de Sardan and Tidjani Alou, 2009), political corruption among state actors in African contexts (Blundo and Olivier de Sardan, 2006) and the ethnography of elections (Olivier de Sardan, 2015). He has also contributed to insert medical anthropology into health policy and system research (HPSR), analyzing health service delivery in West Africa and the interactions between patients and health workers (Jaffré and Olivier de Sardan 2003), and developing an empirical approach of public health policies in Sahelian countries (Olivier de Sardan & Ridde, 2015). His latest work focuses on African public policies and administrations. He is particularly interested in "traveling models" (standardized health and development policies) and their confrontation with local contexts ("pragmatic contexts"), a major aspect of which is the "practical norms" that regulate the "non-observant behaviors" of civil servants, i.e. informal regulations of routine practices that deviate from official norms (De Herdt and Olivier de Sardan, 2015; Olivier de Sardan and Piccoli, 2018). It is also within this framework that he co-edited with Bierschenk a book on "States at work". Based on these various works and more generally on the results of the last twenty years of research in Niger and West Africa, he published a major work in 2021: "La revanche des contextes" (The revenge of contexts), which analyses in depth the unexpected effects of social engineering interventions (carried out to change behaviour and organizations) when confronted with the local contexts in which they are implemented, the complexity of the practical norms of field agents, the diversity of modes of governance that deliver services of general interest, or the tangle of social logics that underlie the practices of actors (English translation 2025 : Traveling models and Practical Norms. The Misadventures of Social Engineering, in Africa and Beyond).

Olivier de Sardan has also authored a reference book on anthropological method and epistemological issues (2008, translated in English 2015: Epistemology, fieldwork and anthropology,). He has strong views on the need to conduct rigorous and long term fieldwork, and he has developed with Thomas Bierschenk an innovative procedure for team research and collective fieldwork in anthropology (the ECRIS canvas).

His field archives are held at the sound archive of the Maison Méditerranéenne des Sciences de l’Homme in Aix-en-Provence, and are shared with the Laboratory for Studies and Research on Social Dynamics and Development (LASDEL) in Niamey.

== Honours ==
- Prize Ester Boserup, University of Copenhagen, 2014
- Chevalier de la légion d'honneur de la République française, 2013
- Doctorate honoris causa, Université de Liège, 2012
- Festschrift volume, published 2007 (Biershenk T, G Blundo, Y Jaffre and M Tidjani Alou (eds.). 2007. Une anthropologie entre rigueur et engagement: essais autour de l'œuvre de Jean-Pierre Olivier de Sardan. Paris: Karthala.)
- Chevalier des palmes académiques de la République du Niger, 2004

== Key publications ==
=== Books in English ===
- Olivier de Sardan, J.P. 2025 Traveling models and Practical Norms. The Misadventures of Social Engineering, in Africa and Beyond, Berghahn
- Olivier de Sardan, J.P. & Piccoli, E. (eds). 2018. Cash Transfers in Context. An anthropological perspective. Berghahn.
- De Herdt, T. and J-P. *Olivier de Sardan (eds.). 2015. Real governance and practical norms in Sub-Saharan Africa. The game of the rules. Routledge,
- Olivier de Sardan J.-P. 2015. Epistemology, fieldwork and anthropology. Palgrave.
- Bierschenk, T. and J-P. Olivier de Sardan (eds.). 2014. States at Work. The Dynamics of African Bureaucracies. Brill.
- Olivier de Sardan J.-P. and Ridde, V. 2013 (eds) "Abolishing user fees for patients in West Africa: lessons for public policies", AFD/ASavoir 20
- Blundo G. and Olivier de Sardan J.-P. (eds) 2006. Everyday corruption and the state: citizens and public officials in Africa. London: Zed Books.
- Olivier de Sardan J.-P. 2005. Anthropology and development. Understanding contemporary social change. London: Zed Books.

=== Articles in English ===
- 2026 "Decolonial Studies against Social Sciences: Missing the Mark”, Development and Change, 2
- 2023 - "Delivering public interest goods in Africa. Stopgap measures, state reform, and commons", Papiers de recherche 277 (Editions Agence française de développement)
- 2023 - "Development anthropology and social engineering: a plea for critical reformism" (with T. de Herdt), Third World Quarterly, DOI: 10.1080/01436597.2023.2177631) 2023
- 2022 - “'Relying on your own strengths' Faced with aid dependency, promoting contextual experts in public policy in Africa", Global Africa, 1 (1): 96-111
- 2022 - “The Development World: Conflicts of Interest at All Levels” (with V. Ridde), Revue Internationale d’Etudes du Développement, 249: 247-269, 2022
- 2019 -"How to study bureaucracies ethnographically" (with T. Bierschenk), Critique of Anthropology 39 (2) :243-257
- 2021 - "The Construction of States and Societies in the Sahel”, The Oxford Handbook of the African Sahel, L. Villalon ed, 2021
- 2017 - "Travelling models and the challenge of pragmatic contexts and practical norms: the case of maternal health” » (with A. Diarra & M. Moha), Health Research Policy and Systems, 15 (suppt 1) : 60 (DOI: 10.1186/s12961-017-0213-9)
- 2016 - "For an Anthropology of Gaps, Discrepancies and Contradictions”, Antropologia 3, 1: 111-131
- 2016 - "Rivalries of proximity beyond the household in Niger: political elites and the baab-izey pattern”, Africa, 87(1), 120-136
- 2013 - "Embeddedness and informal norms: Institutionnalisms and anthropology", Critique of Anthropology 33(3): 280-299.
- 2011 - "The eight modes of local governance in West Africa", IDS Bulletin 42(2): 22-31.
- 2009 - "State bureaucracy and government in West Francophone Africa. Empirical Diagnosis, Historical Perspective", in Blundo and Lemeur (eds), pp. 39–71.
- 2005 - "Classic Ethnology and the Socio-Anthropology of Public Spaces New Themes and Old Methods in European African Studies",Africa Spectrum 40 (3):485-497.
- 1999 - "African corruption in the context of globalization", in Fardon, Binsbergen (van) & Dijk (van) (eds.). Modernity on a shoestring. Dimensions of globalization, consumption and development in Africa and beyond. London, Eidos : 247-268.
- 1999 - "A moral economy of corruption in Africa ?", The Journal of Modern African Studies 37 (1) : 25-52.
- 1998 - "Illness entities in West Africa", Anthropology and Medicine 5 (2) : 193-217.
- 1997 - [with T. Bierschenk], "Local powers in the absence of the State. Configurations of local political power and their relations with the state in rural Central African Republic", Review of Modern African Studies : 441-468.
- 1997 - [with T. Bierschenk], "ECRIS: rapid collective inquiry for the identification of conflicts and strategic groups", Human Organization 56 (2) : 238-244.
- 1992 - "Occultism and the ethnographic "I". The exoticizing of magic from Durkheim to "postmodern" anthropology", Critique of Anthropology 12(1) : 5-25.
- 1988 - "Peasant logics and development projects logics", Sociologia Ruralis 28 (2-3) : 216-228.
- 1983 - "On film and the ethnographic real", Current Anthropology 24 (4).
- 1983 - "The songhay-zarma female slave", in Robertson & Klein (eds.). Women and slavery in Africa. Madison, University of Wisconsin Press : 130-141.
- 1978 - "Marriage among the Wogo", in Seddon (ed.). Relations of production. London, F. Cass : 357-389.

=== Books in French ===
- Olivier de Sardan J.-P. 2023. L'Enchevêtrement des crises au Sahel.: Niger, Mali, Burkina Faso. Paris: Khartala.
- Olivier de Sardan J.-P. & Vari-Lavoisier, I. (eds.). 2022. Les modèles voyageurs: une ingénierie sociale du développement. Paris: Eds. Sorbonne.
- Olivier de Sardan J.-P. 2021. La revanche des contextes. Des mésaventures de l'ingéniérie sociale en Afrique et au-delà. Paris: Karthala. Reviews
- Olivier de Sardan J.-P.(ed) 2015. Élections au village. Une ethnographie de la culture électorale au Niger. Paris: Karthala.
- Olivier de Sardan J.-P. and V. Ridde (eds) 2015. Une politique publique de santé et ses contradictions. La gratuité des soins au Burkina Faso, au Mali et au Niger. Paris: Karthala.
- Olivier de Sardan J.-P. and M. Tidjani Alou (eds) 2009. Les pouvoirs locaux au Niger (Tome 1 : en attendant la décentralisation). Paris: Karthala.
- Olivier de Sardan J.-P. 2008. La rigueur du qualitatif. Les contraintes empiriques de l’interprétation socioanthropologique. Louvain-La-Neuve: Bruylant. review
- Blundo G. and Olivier de Sardan J.-P. (eds.) 2003. Pratiques de la description. Paris: Éditions de l’EHESS (Enquête, vol. 3)
- Jaffré, J. and Olivier de Sardan J.-P. (eds.) 2003. Une médecine inhospitalière. Les difficiles relations entre soignants et soignés dans cinq capitales d'Afrique de l'Ouest. Paris: Karthala.
- Bierschenk T., J.-P. Chauveau & J.-P. Olivier de Sardan (eds.) 2000. Courtiers en développement: Les villages africains en quête de projets. Paris: Editions Karthala.
- Olivier de Sardan J.-P. and Y. Jaffré (eds.). 1999. La construction sociale des maladies. Les entités nosologiques populaires en Afrique de l'Ouest. Paris: PUF. review
- Bierschenk T. and Olivier de Sardan J.-P. (eds.) 1998. Les pouvoirs au village: le Bénin rural entre démocratisation et decentralisation. Paris: Karthala. reviews
- Olivier de Sardan J.-P. 1995. Anthropologie et développement : essai en socio-anthropologie du changement social. Paris: Karthala.
- Olivier de Sardan J.-P. and E. Paquot (eds.) 1991. D'un savoir à l'autre: les agents de développement comme médiateurs. Paris, GRET- Ministère de la Coopération.
- P. Boiral, J.F. Lantéri, and Olivier de Sardan J.-P. (eds.). 1985. Paysans, experts et chercheurs en Afrique noire: sciences sociales et développement rural. Paris: Karthala.
- Olivier de Sardan J.-P. 1984. Les sociétés songhay-zarma (chefs, guerriers, esclaves, paysans...). Paris: Karthala.
- Olivier de Sardan J.-P. 1982. Concepts et conceptions songhay-zarma (histoire, culture, société). Paris: Nubia.
- Olivier de Sardan J.-P. 1976. Quand nos pères étaient captifs (récits paysans du Niger). Paris: Nubia.
- Olivier de Sardan J.-P. 1969. Système des relations économiques et sociales chez les Wogo du Niger. Paris: Institut d'ethnologie.
- Olivier de Sardan J.-P. 1969. Les voleurs d'hommes (notes sur l'histoire des Kurtey). Paris-Niamey: Études Nigériennes.
- Olivier de Sardan J.-P. 1965. Les Wogos du Niger. Paris-Niamey: Études Nigériennes.
