= Frankfurt Rhine-Main =

Coordinates: 50.1°N 8.7°E

Rhine-Main Metropolitan Region Rhein-Main-Gebiet
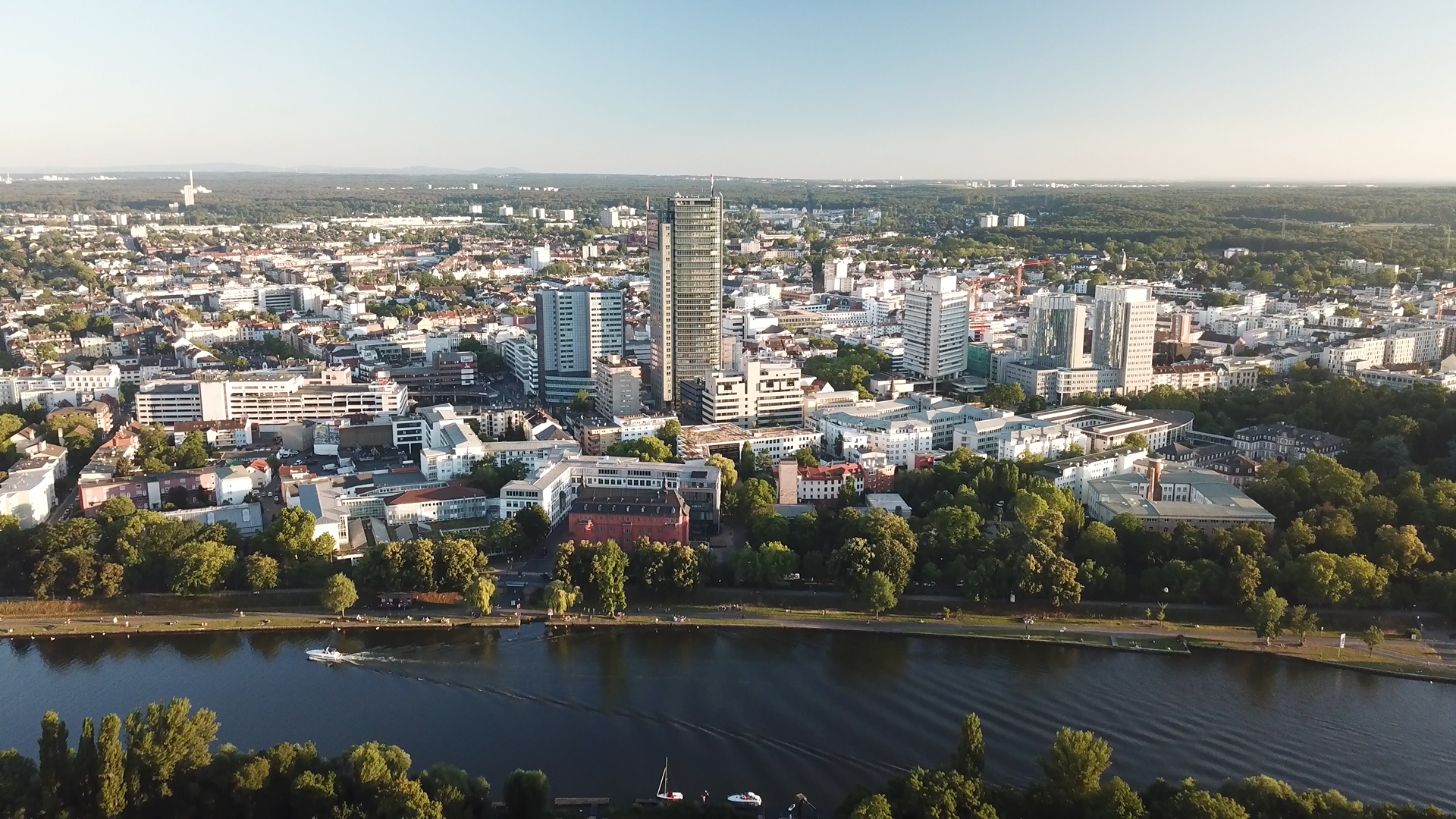
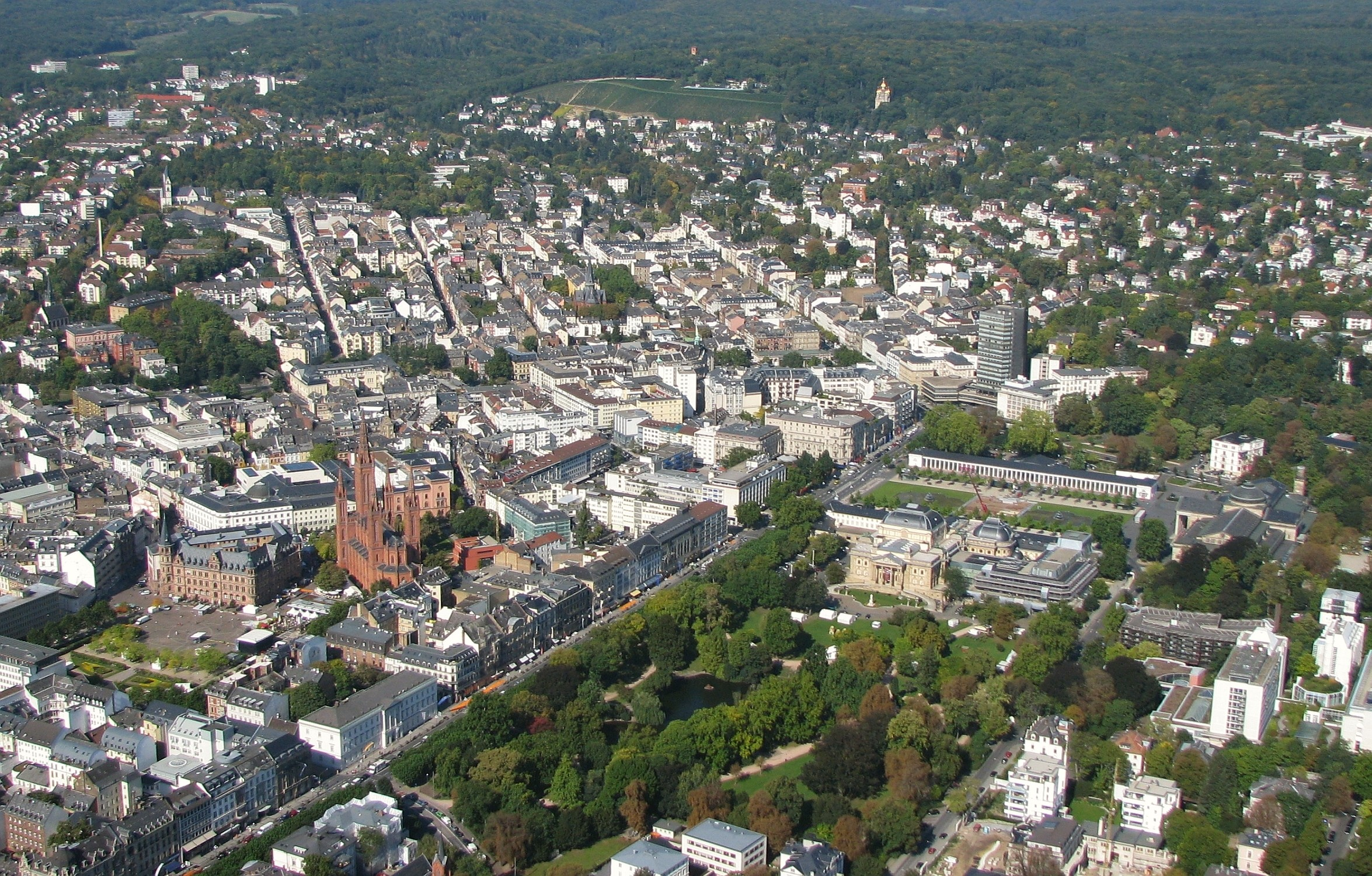
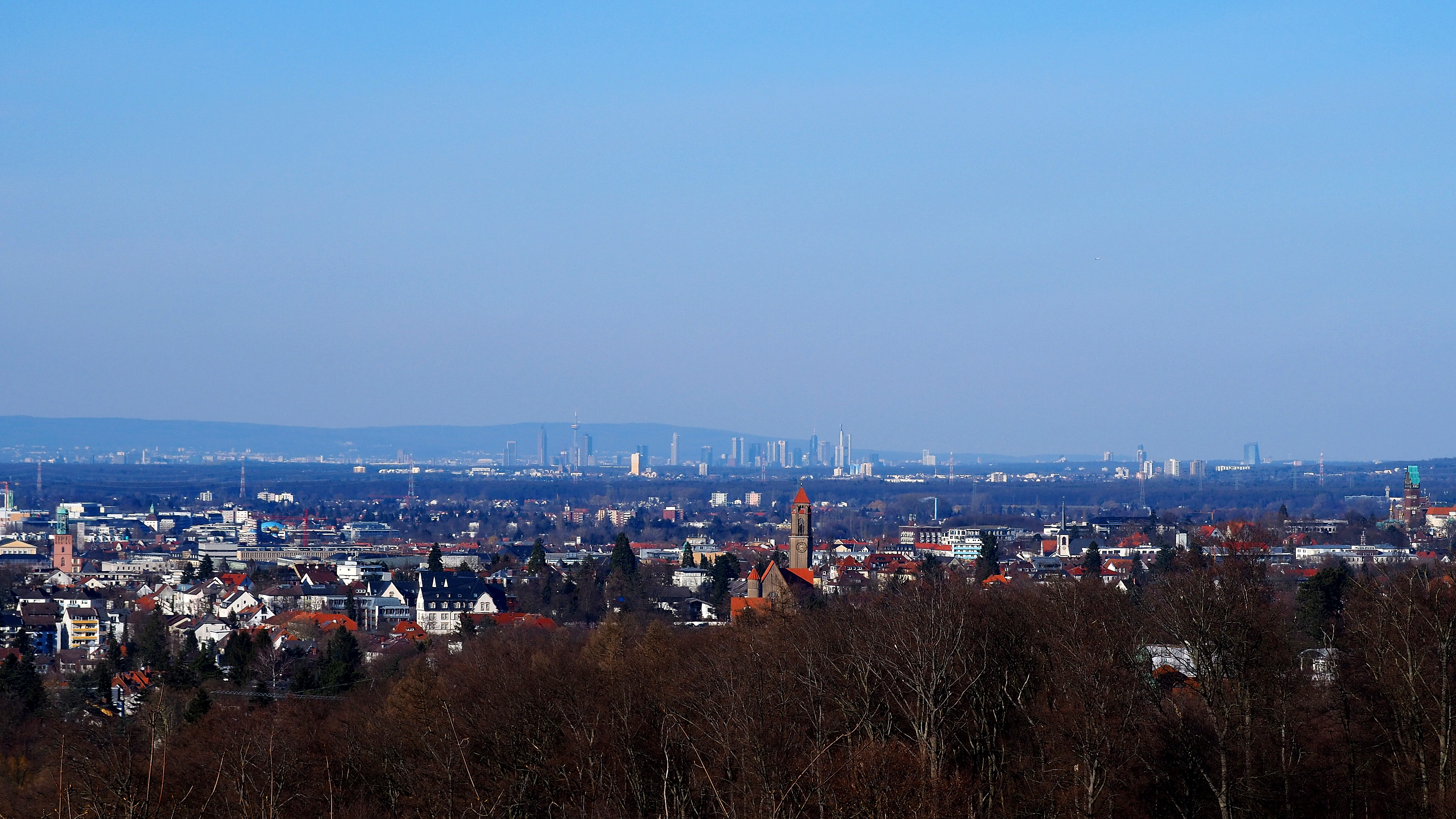
- From top, left to right: View of Frankfurt am Main; Aerial view of Offenbach am Main; Wiesbaden; Darmstadt

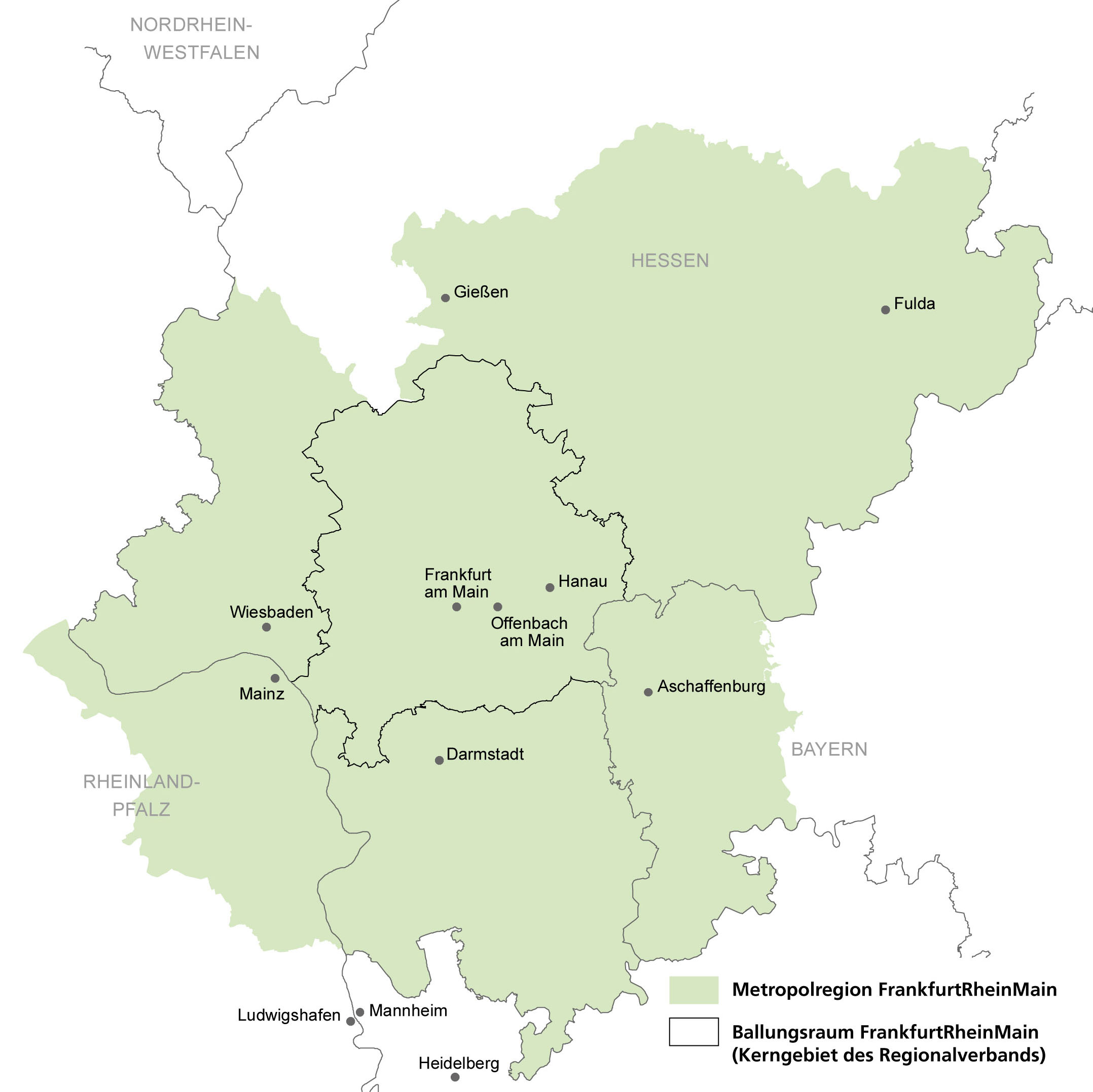
- Rhine-Main Metropolitan Region (in green)
- Country: Germany
- States: Hesse; Rhineland-Palatinate; Bavaria
- Largest cities: Frankfurt am Main; Wiesbaden; Mainz; Darmstadt
- Established: 1 April 2001

Government
  - Type: Frankfurt/Rhine-Main Conurbation Planning Association
  - Verbandsdirektor: Thomas Horn (CDU)

Area
  - Metro: 14,755 km^{2} (5,697 sq mi)

Population (2022)
  - Metro: 5,907,863
  - Metro density: 400.40/km^{2} (1,037.0/sq mi)

GDP
  - Metro: €300.868 billion (2021)
- Time zone: UTC+1 (CET)
- Website: region-frankfurt.de

The Rhine-Main Metropolitan Region, often simply referred to as Frankfurt Rhine-Main, Frankfurt Rhine-Main area or Rhine-Main area (German: Rhein-Main-Gebiet, Frankfurt/Rhein-Main or FrankfurtRheinMain, abbreviated FRM), is the third-largest metropolitan region in Germany after Rhine-Ruhr and Berlin-Brandenburg, with a total population exceeding 5.9 million. The metropolitan region is located in the central-western part of Germany, and stretches over parts of three German states: Hesse, Rhineland-Palatinate, and Bavaria. The largest cities in the region are Frankfurt am Main, Wiesbaden, Mainz, Darmstadt, Offenbach, Worms, Hanau, and Aschaffenburg.

The polycentric region is named after its core city, Frankfurt, and the two rivers Rhine and Main. The Frankfurt Rhine-Main area is officially designated as a European Metropolitan region by the German Federal Ministry of Transport, Building and Urban Affairs and covers an area of roughly 13,000 square kilometers (5,000 sq mi).

The region is the 14th biggest by GDP in the European Union.

== Subdivisions ==
Although Rhine-Main is considered to be a polycentric metropolitan region, the economic size and political weight of the city of Frankfurt sets it into a very monocentric relation with her commuter belt. Since the early 1970s, the Frankfurt am Main metropolitan area (German: Ballungsraum Frankfurt/Rhein-Main) is defined as the area encompassing the cities of Frankfurt and Offenbach and their directly neighboring districts.

The Regierungsbezirk Darmstadt of the state of Hesse could be seen as the next administrative division, for it lies entirely within the metropolitan region and further includes the cities of Darmstadt and Wiesbaden along with a number of larger districts. Only on a level further, the metropolitan region also includes the cities and districts of Mainz and Aschaffenburg in the two adjoining federal states of Rhineland-Palatinate and Bavaria.

=== Metropolitan region and larger urban zones ===
Eurostat's 'Urban Audit' splits the Frankfurt Rhine-Main region into four Larger Urban Zones (LUZ). These zones do exclude a number of districts in the metropolitan area.

Urban zone	Major cities	Population	Area
Frankfurt am Main urban zone		2,729,562	4,305 km^{2}
	Frankfurt am Main	773,068	248 km^{2}
	Offenbach am Main	134,170	45 km^{2}
Wiesbaden urban zone		462,098	1,015 km^{2}
	Wiesbaden	283,083	204 km^{2}
Darmstadt urban zone		439,084	781 km^{2}
	Darmstadt	162,243	122 km^{2}
Mainz urban zone		403,849	704 km^{2}
	Mainz	218,578	98 km^{2}
Rhine-Main		5,808,518	14,755 km^{2}

== Cities and districts ==
Picture	City or district	Area	Population
Frankfurt	Frankfurt am Main	248 km^{2}	750,000
Offenbach port	Offenbach am Main	45 km^{2}	118,245
	Landkreis Offenbach	356 km^{2}	337,986
Schlüchtern in Main Kinzig Kreis	Main-Kinzig-Kreis	1,397 km^{2}	411,956
Lohrberg	Wetteraukreis	122 km^{2}	142,191
Bad Homburg	Hochtaunuskreis	482 km^{2}	233,427
Kelkheim and further towns of Main-Taunus-Kreis	Main-Taunus-Kreis	122 km^{2}	142,191
Darmstadt	Darmstadt	122 km^{2}	142,191
Darmstadt	Landkreis Darmstadt-Dieburg	659 km^{2}	289,102
Rüsselsheim	Landkreis Groß-Gerau	453 km^{2}	253,502
Wiesbaden	Wiesbaden	204 km^{2}	275,489
Rüdesheim am Rhein	Rheingau-Taunus-Kreis	98 km^{2}	196,784
Subtotal	Hesse	7,445 km^{2}	3,778,689
Mainz	Mainz	98 km^{2}	196,784
Bingen am Rhein	Mainz-Bingen	606 km^{2}	201,451
Worms	Worms	109 km^{2}	81,784
—	Landkreis Alzey-Worms	588 km^{2}	124,758
Subtotal	Rhineland-Palatinate	1405 km^{2}	604,777
Aschaffenburg	Aschaffenburg	63 km^{2}	68,646
—	Landkreis Aschaffenburg	699 km^{2}	173,946
Miltenberg	Landkreis Miltenberg	716 km^{2}	130,009
Subtotal	Bavaria	1,478 km^{2}	372,601
Total	Frankfurt Rhine-Main metropolitan region	14,800 km^{2}	5,800,000

== Economy ==
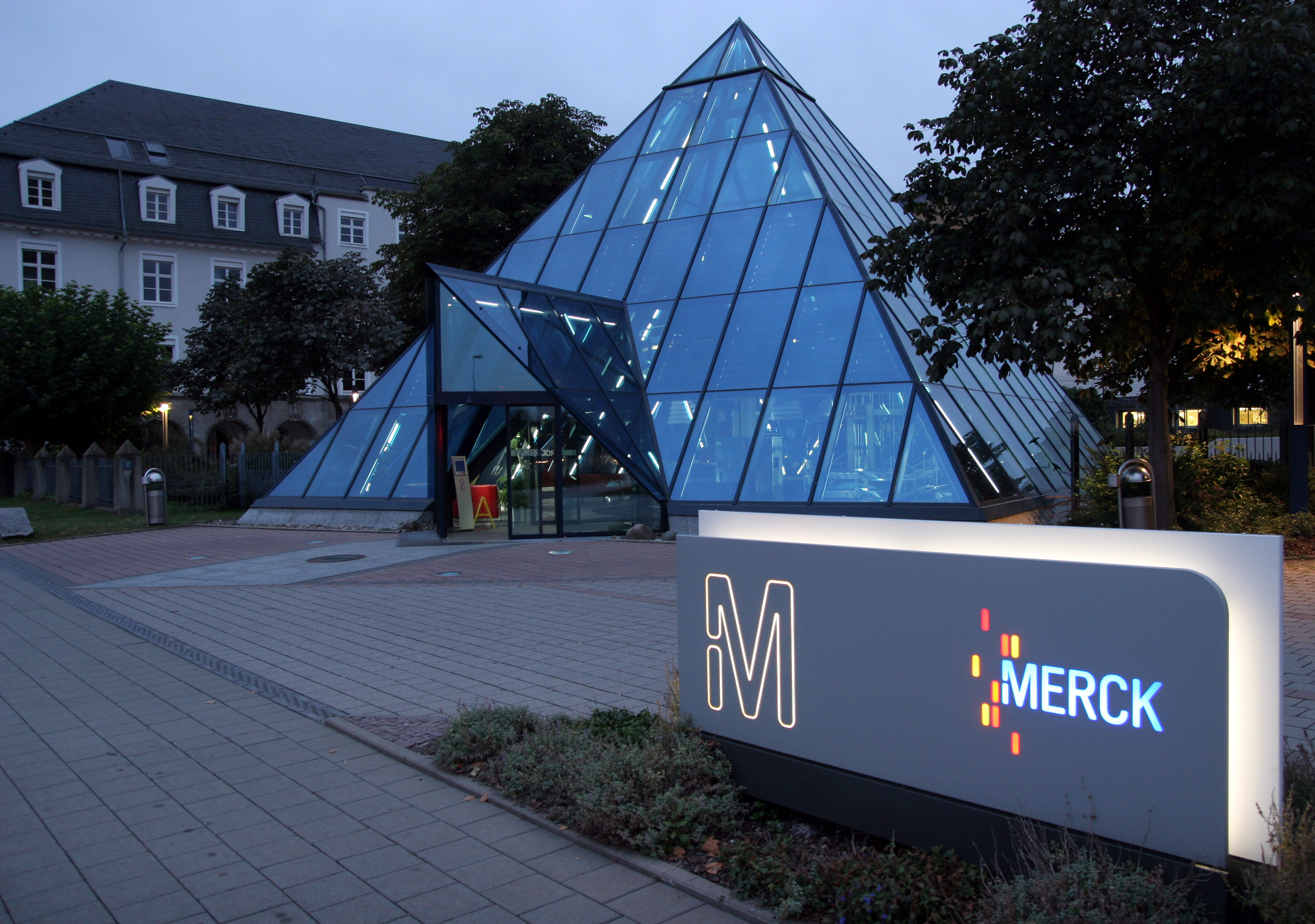
Headquarters of Merck Group in Darmstadt, the world's oldest operating chemical and pharmaceutical company, as well as one of the largest pharmaceutical companies globally.

With its central location in southwestern Germany, the Frankfurt Rhine-Main region has been an important industrial and transport center since industrialization began in the mid-19th century. The region is a major financial center of both Germany and Europe, with the European Central Bank headquartered in Frankfurt am Main. In 2018, about 7.9% of Germany's gross domestic product (GDP) was generated in the region, as well as over three-fourths of the state of Hesse's GDP.

In addition to banking and finance, the chemical industry has had a long established presence in the metropolitan region, with the Industriepark Höchst (Höchst Industrial Park) in the southwestern outskirts of Frankfurt am Main being one of the largest industrial parks in Germany and host to over 90 chemical, pharmaceutical and healthcare firms. Other such firms like Boehringer Ingelheim, Merck Group, Biontech, Fresenius and Fresenius Medical Care are spread all over the Rhine-Main area. The automobile, construction, and real estate sectors also contribute to a significant sector of the regional economy, with the latter two accounting for 18% of the GDP. Darmstadt and Wiesbaden are the site of headquarters and major offices for insurance firms.

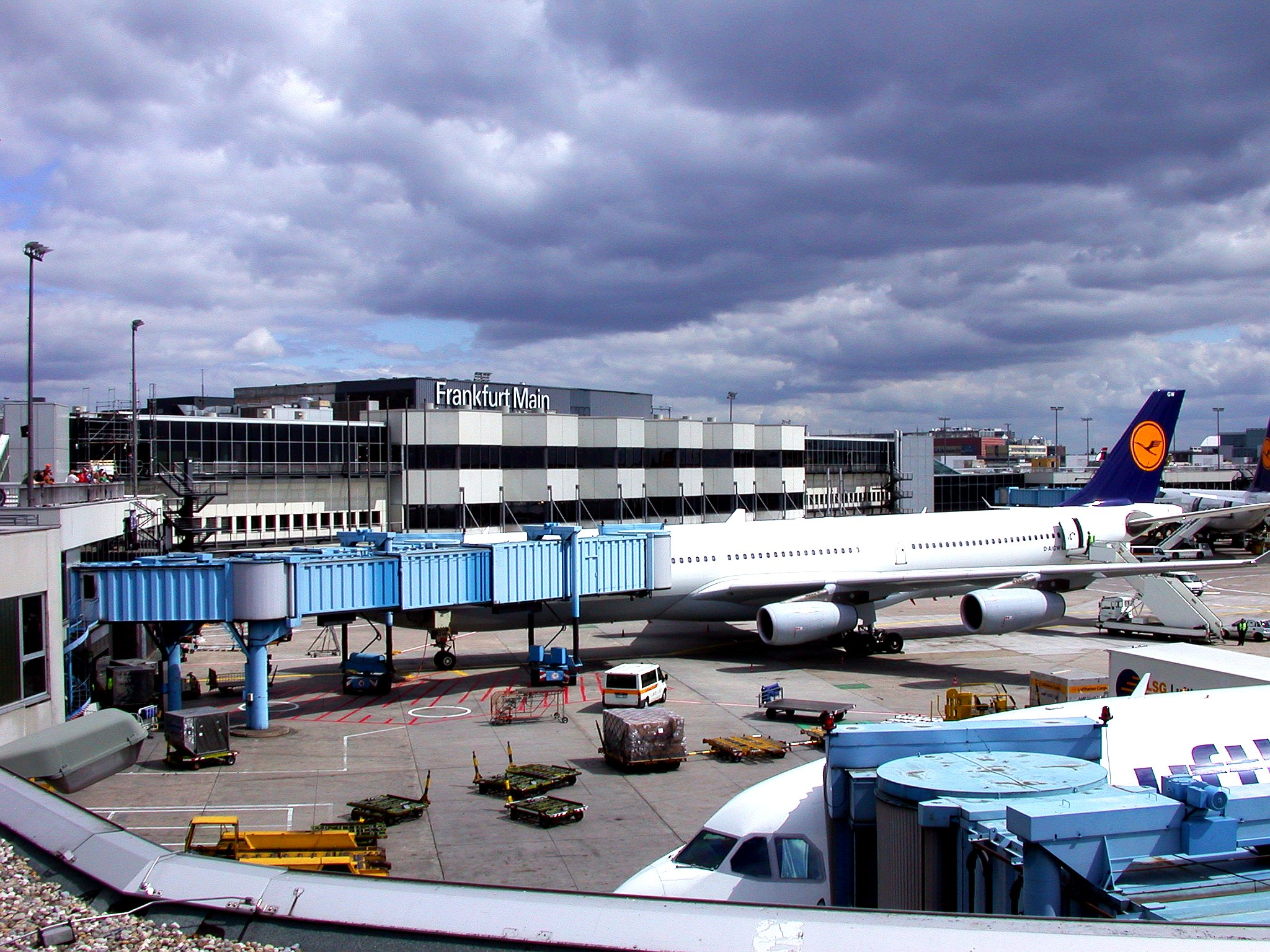
Frankfurt Airport serves as a major gateway and logistical hub for the area and is Germany's busiest airport.

Geographically situated in the middle of the European continent, Frankfurt Rhine-Main is one of the largest logistics hubs in the world, with major connections provided by Frankfurt Airport, Germany's and one of the world's busiest air hubs, and an extensive road and rail system. The Frankfurter Kreuz and Frankfurt am Main Hauptbahnhof are among the busiest road and rail interchanges in Europe respectively. Other major rail stations include Mainz, Frankfurt Süd, and Frankfurt Airport.

== Transport ==
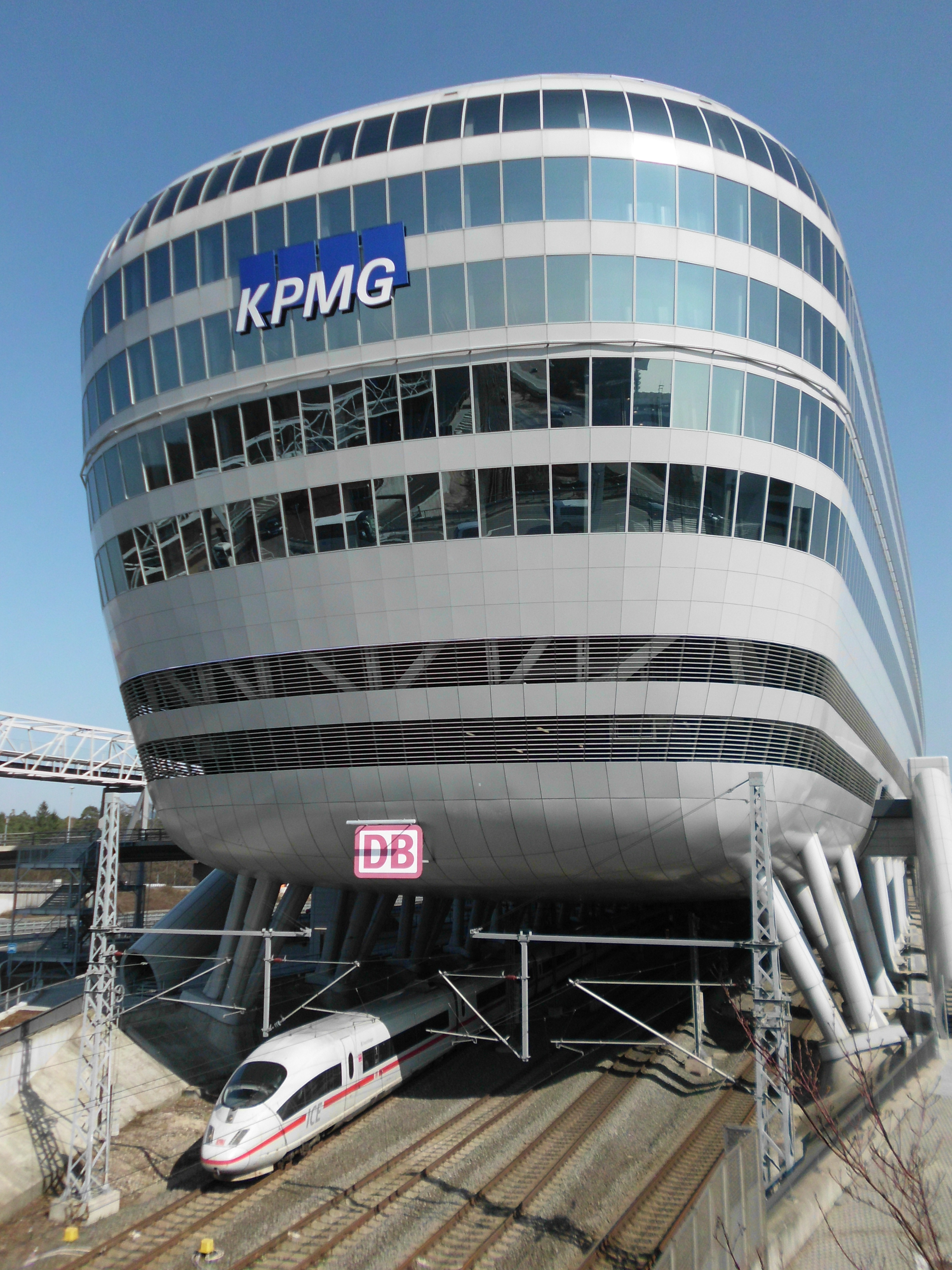
ICE 3 departing westward from Frankfurt Airport long-distance station underneath The Squaire

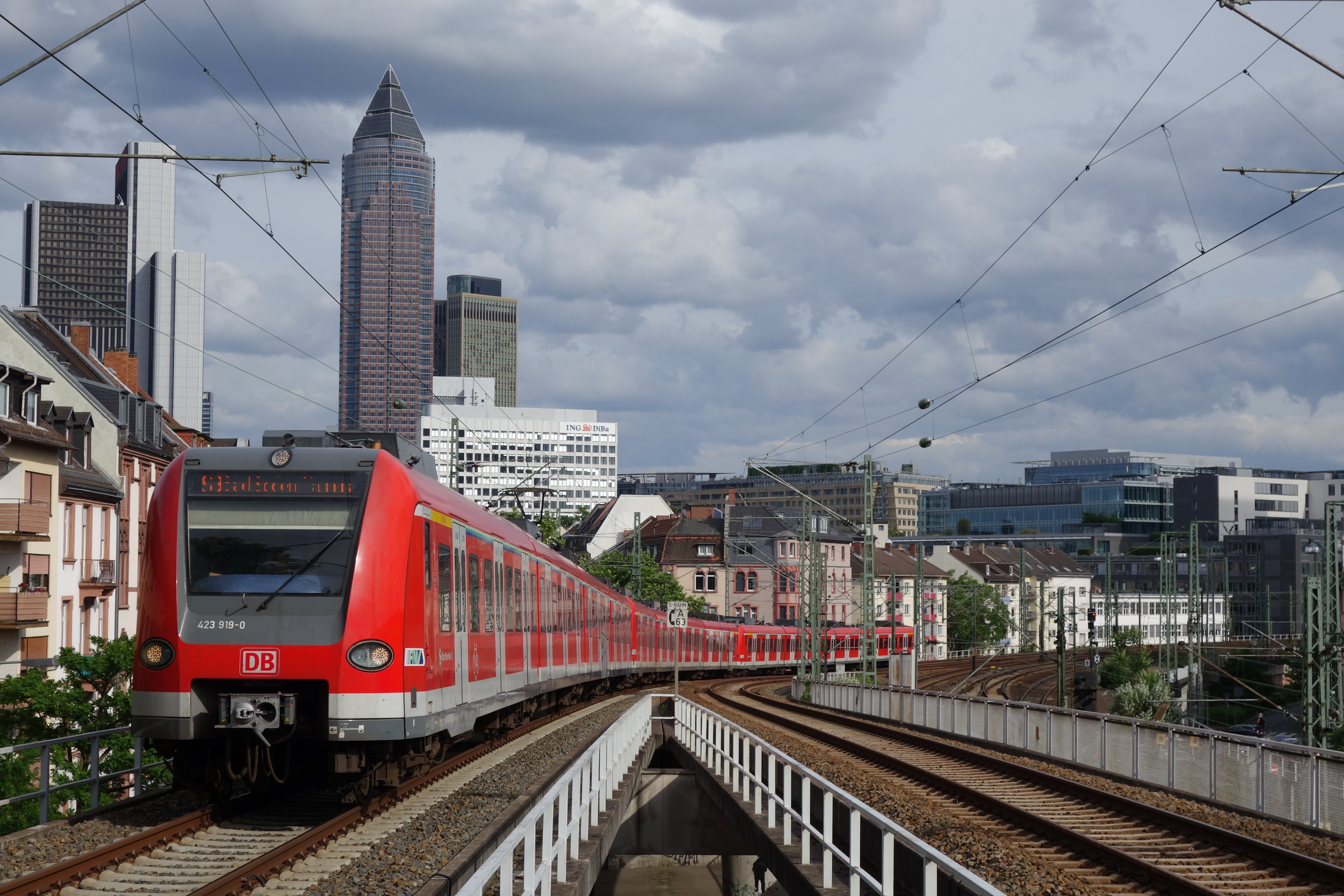
S-Bahn Rhein-Main: Class 423 approaching Frankfurt West station

The growth of the area is chiefly to be traced to the favorable communications that promoted an early industrialization. Today, however, the importance of industrial concerns has to a great extent been replaced by banking, trade and logistics. Frankfurt lies within the populous Blue Banana region of Europe, which here runs along the Rhine valley, and the city is also a stepping stone from and to various parts of Switzerland and Southern Germany. The Rhine-Ruhr is accessible via a one-hour trip on the Cologne–Frankfurt high-speed rail line, and the air route Frankfurt–Berlin is the busiest in German domestic air travel.

Frankfurt Airport is the busiest airport by passenger traffic in Germany and one of the three busiest airports in Europe. Thereby, along with a strong railway connection, the area also serves as a major transportation hub.

The S-Bahn network extends from Wiesbaden and Mainz in the west to Hanau in the east, and from Friedberg in the north to Darmstadt and Riedstadt in the south.

== Education ==
The Frankfurt/Rhine-Main metropolitan region is home to five universities and over 20 partly postgraduate colleges, with a total of over 200,000 students. The region's three public research universities, the

- Goethe University Frankfurt
- Johannes Gutenberg University Mainz
- TU Darmstadt

make up the Rhine Main Universities alliance. They have been designated as so-called Universities of Excellence in 2026. Private universities in the Frankfurt/Rhine-Main metropolitan region are

- EBS University of Business and Law
- Frankfurt School of Finance & Management.

Notable colleges and universities of applied sciences (Fachhochschulen) include:

- Darmstadt University of Applied Sciences
- Frankfurt University of Applied Sciences
- RheinMain University of Applied Sciences
- Frankfurt University of Music and Performing Arts
- Städelschule
- University of Applied Sciences, Mainz
- Catholic University of Applied Sciences, Mainz

== See also ==
- Global city

== Gallery ==
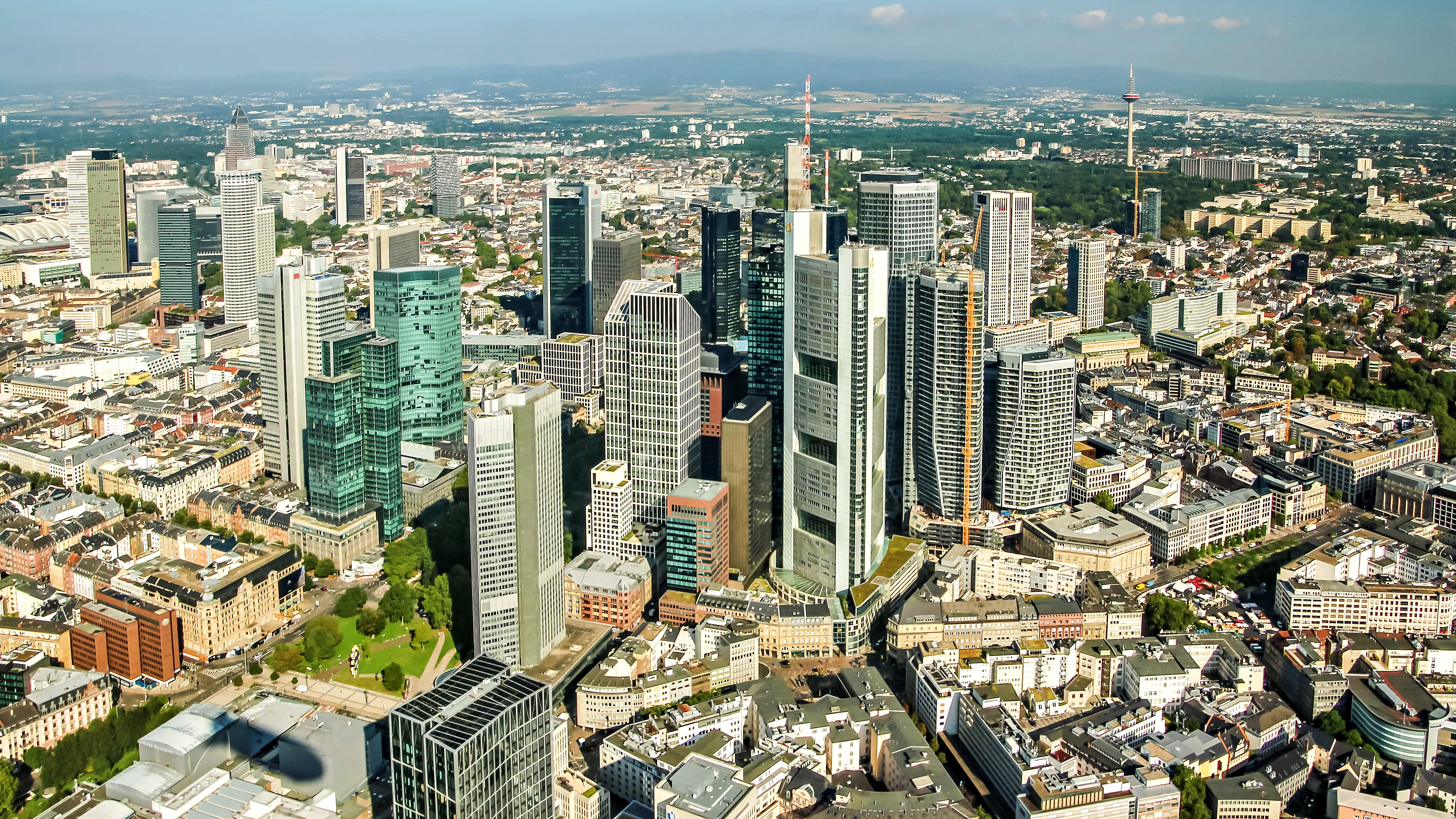
Frankfurt is the most important city of the Rhein-Main area

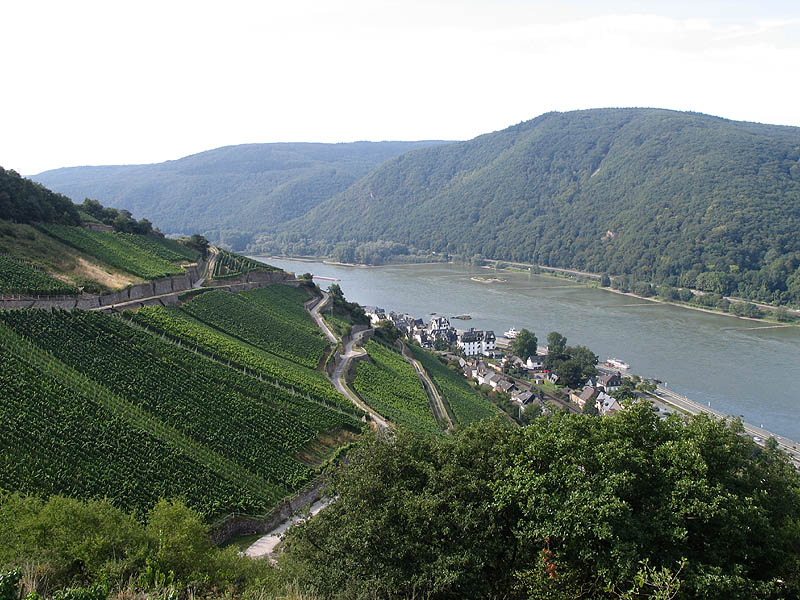
Rheingau

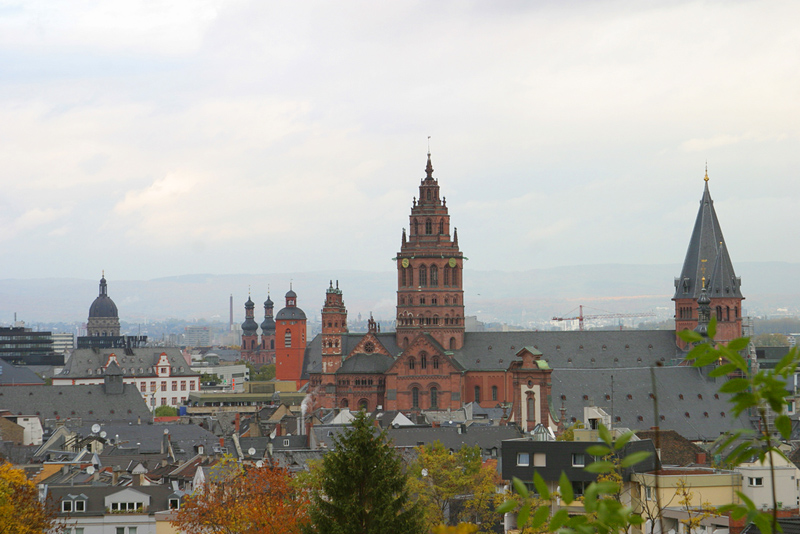
Old town of Mainz

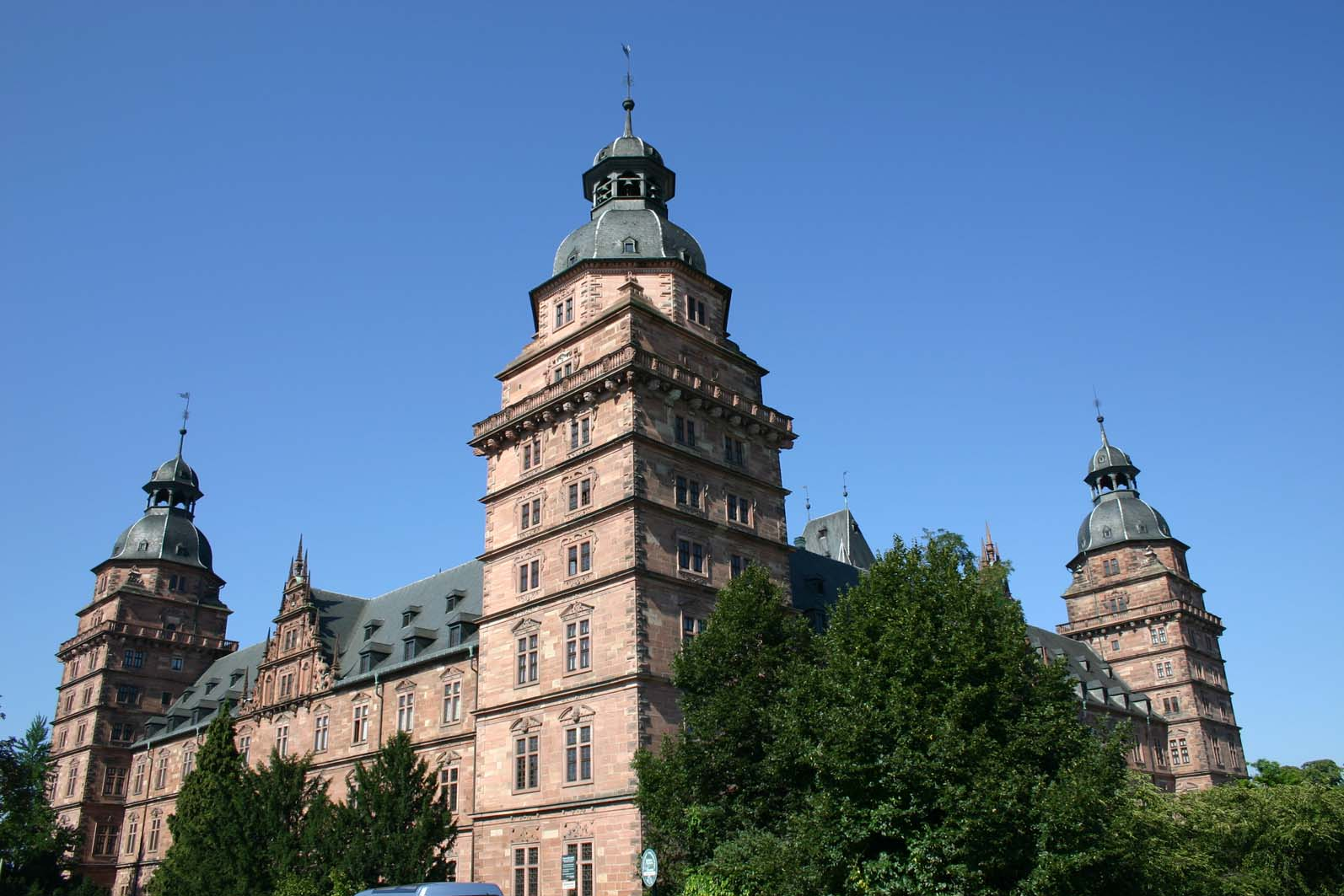
Castle of Johannisburg in Aschaffenburg

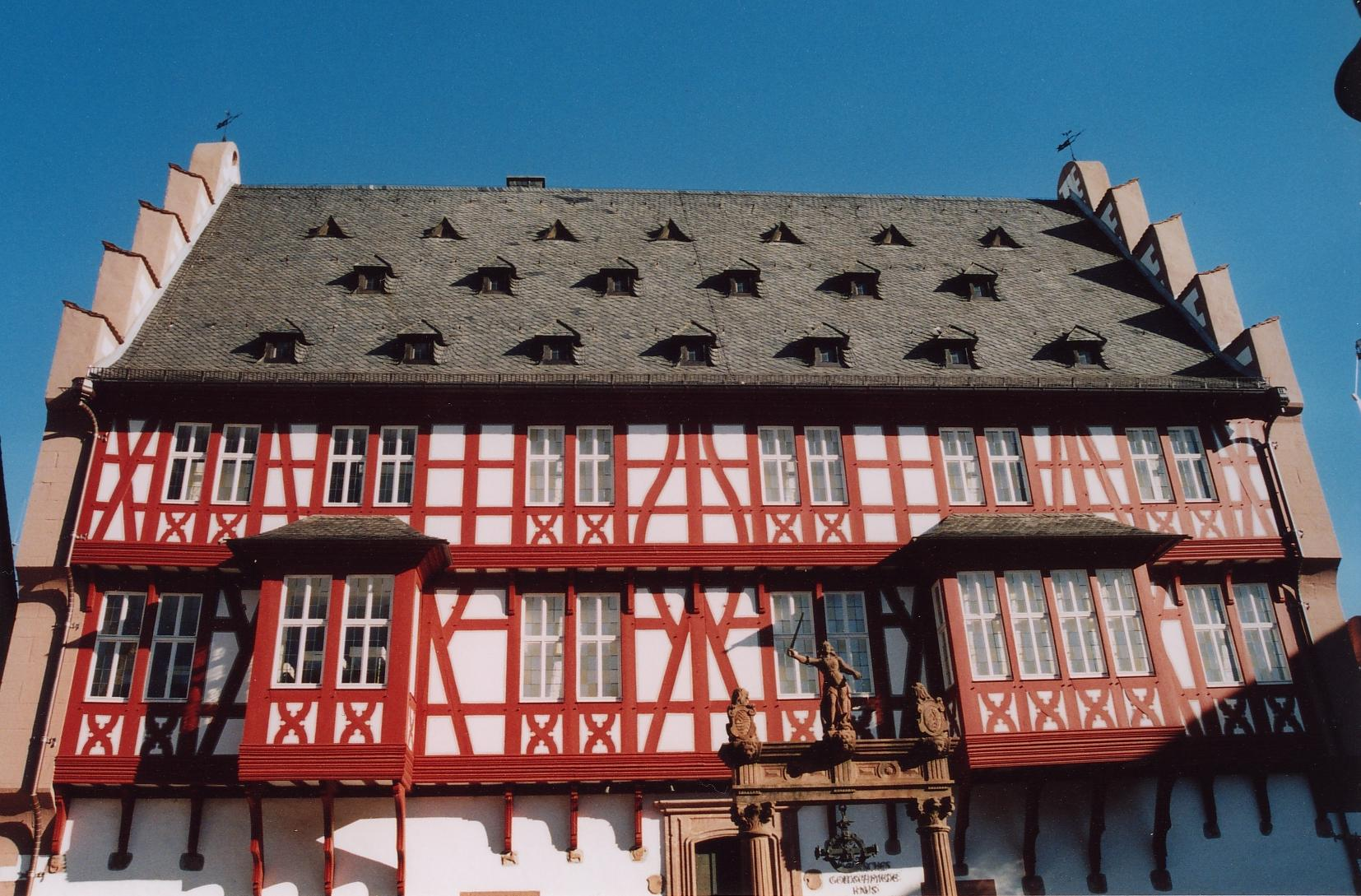
German House of Goldsmiths in Hanau

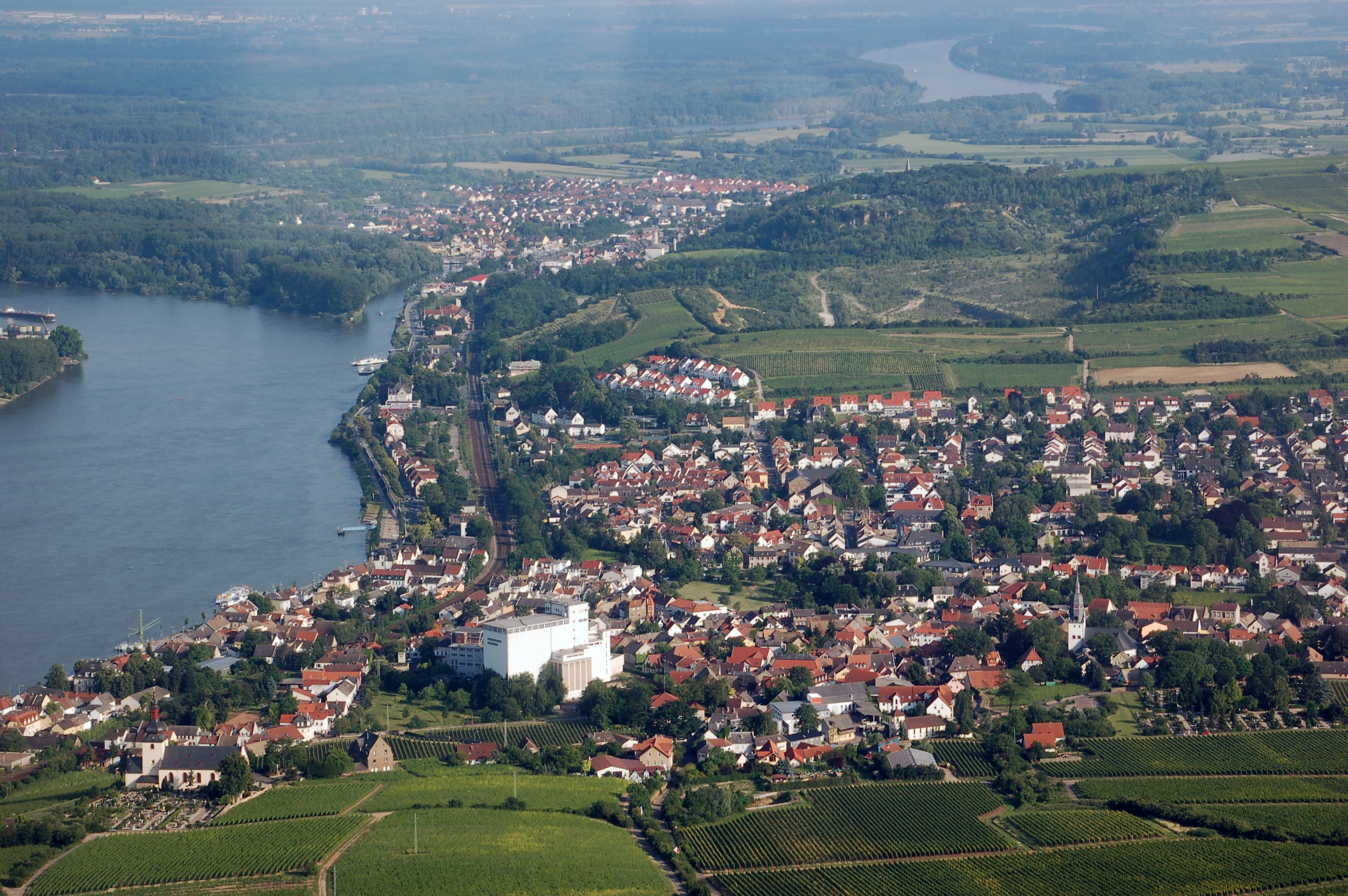
Rhenish Hesse

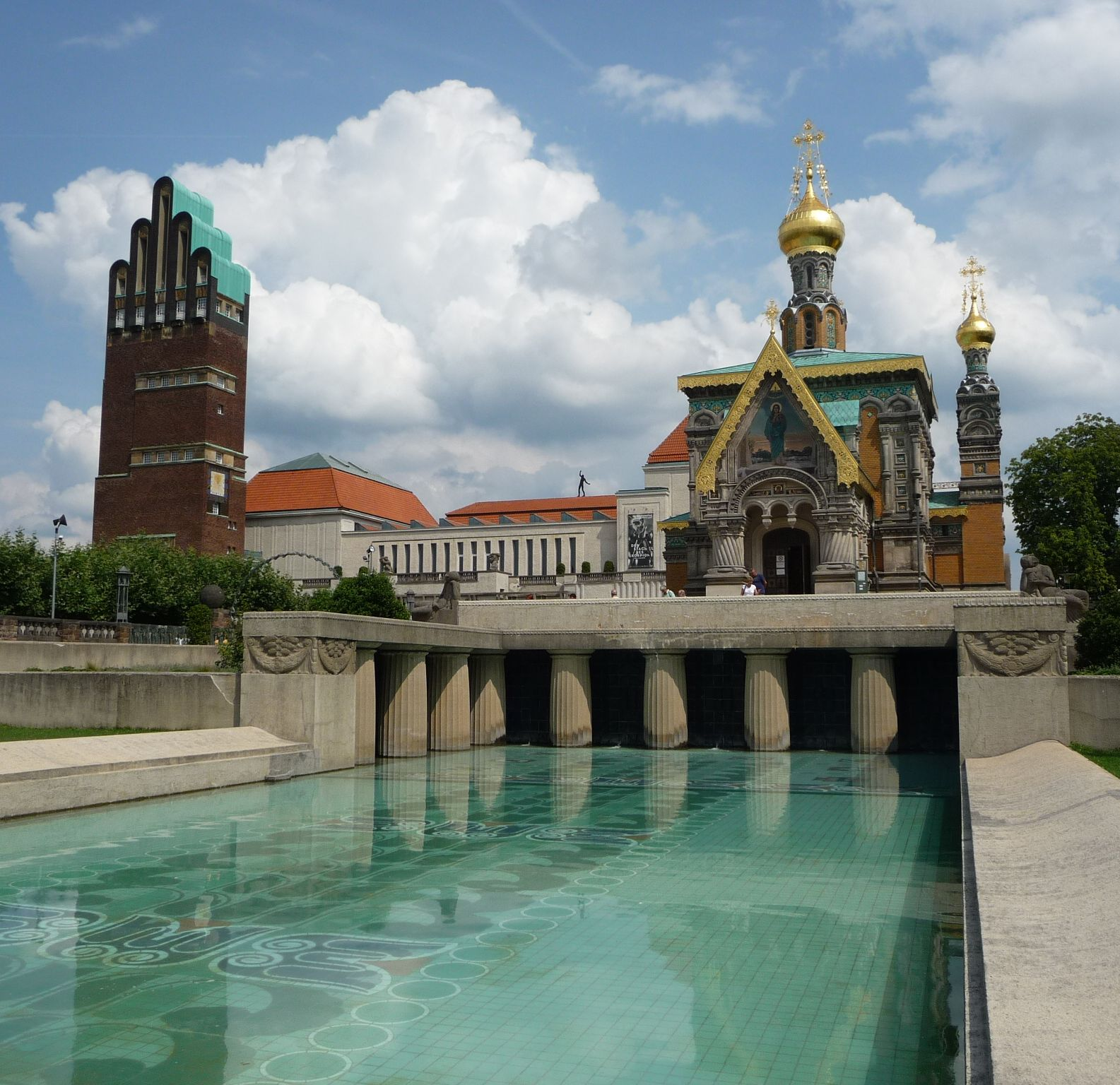
Darmstadt Artists' Colony

Town Hall of Michelstadt
