= Wogo people =

Ethnic group of Niger and Mali

The Wogo people are a small subgroup of the broader Songhai people. They are found primarily in Niger and Mali on the banks and islands of the Niger river, a territory they share with the Zarma, the Kurtey and the Songhay. The main Wogo communities are found on the islands in the Tillabery region of Niger with the largest being Ayorou in Niger and Boura in Mali. They speak the Wogo Ciine songhay dialect.

== Economy and society ==
The Wogos are mainly farmers of rice and tobacco and to some extent millet, corn, fishing and rearing of cattle. The Niger River is their main source of living.

== Culture ==
The Wogos are very closely related to the Songhai culturally. They almost speak the same language as them and are both Muslims, but the Wogos practice holy possession dances which the Songhays do not. They are also good craftsmen especially in weaving and basketry.

== Sources ==
- Jean-Pierre Olivier de Sardan, Les Wogo du Niger, Institut fondamental d'Afrique noire, Commissariat General Au Plan, IFAN-CNRS, 1966, 116 p.
- Jean-Pierre Olivier de Sardan, Système des relations économiques et sociales chez les Wogo, Niger, Institut d'ethnologie, Paris, 1969, 234 p.
