= Jakob Friedrich von Bielfeld =

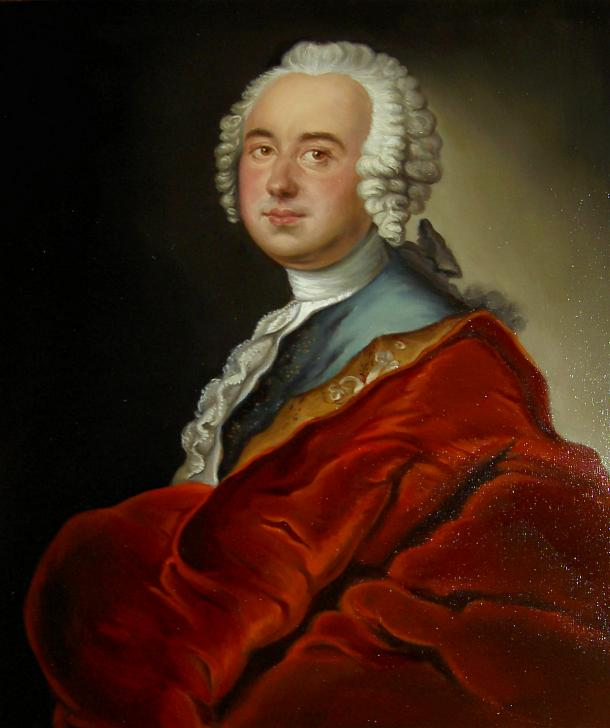
Jakob Friedrich von Bielfeld (1717–1770)

Jakob Friedrich von Bielfeld (31 March 1717 – 5 April 1770) was a German writer and statesman for the Kingdom of Prussia during the Age of Enlightenment. His work mainly consists of reflections on national governance, but also of comedies. His work had significant impact on both Political Science and Statistics. Bielfeld was an advisor to Frederick the Great of Prussia. His political work was translated into several languages and introduced by Joachim Georg Darjes.

== Stations of his Life ==
Bielfeld was born in Hamburg in 1717. His ancestors were rich Merchants. He started studying in Leyden, Netherlands in 1732, from where he traveled to France and England in 1735. During this travels he got in contact with Montesquieu. Bielfeld became a freemason in Hamburg in 1737. In 1738 he was the speaker of the introduction ceremony Crown Prince Frederick of Prussia becoming a freemason. When Frederick became King, Bielfeld started his diplomatic career as a Counselor to the Prussian Consulates in Hannover and London and Berlin afterwards. Bielfeld became a tutor of Prince August Ferdinand in 1745 with whom he would stay in contact for his whole life. In 1747 Bielfeld became curator of Prussia's universities and director of Berlin's Charité Hospital. In 1748 he married Dorothea Juliane von Reich and was ennobled as a Baron as a wedding gift from Frederick the Great. In 1753 Bielfeld became the director of the “Königliche Schauspiel” (Royal Theater). Bielfeld retired from service for the King of Prussia in 1755 at the age of 38. It is assumed that he retired frustrated because he was not offered engagement with higher prestige, since the King maybe had lost credit on Bielfeld due to some rather unsuccessful undertakings by Bielfeld. Bielfeld died in Altenburg at the age 53, in 1770.

== Thought and relevance for his time and today ==
Bielfelds thought can roughly be classified into Enlightened Despotism. He is one of the four great German Economists of the Enlightenment, who are Georg Heinrich Zincke (1692–1769), Bielfeld himself, Johann Heinrich Gottlob von Justi (1717–1771), and Johann Friedrich von Preiffer (1718–1787). However, only Bielfeld is listed in Ken Carpenter's honors list of “Economic Bestsellers before 1850”.

Bielfelds worldview derives from three epoches: Lutheran protestantism, rationalism and the classic. In contrast to his relatively close relationship with Frederick the Great and his correspondence with Voltaire Bielfeld did not oppose the ideas of Machiavel, even though Frederick the Great's Antimachiavel (1740) was a result of the correspondence with Voltaire. Therefore, Bielfeld was of the believe that in terms of morals, the governmental and private sphere are to be separated.

Bielfeld developed his thought in a time when central Europe's nations were scattered due to the Peace of Westphalia. Although the number of States had already declined he still had access to a considerably diverse range of different approaches to governance, which he was able to drive experience from. He was a member of the court of Prussia and served as a diplomat in foreign countries, which enriched his experience. Bielfeld is said to be the first introducing foreign thought to German Cameralism.

His most relevant work “Institutions Politiques” is written in the tradition of Fürstenspiegel (Kings Mirror), which goes back to Greek (Aristotle) and Roman (Pliny the Younger) and aims to list the virtues and duties of rulers and princess to establish the necessary wisdom and principles for good governance. The work was well recognized among kings and queens like Katharina the Great, who gave order to translate it into Russian.

Bielfeld argued in favor for educating all the people of a Nation, which puts him in one line with the later Prussian Reform Movement.

=== Economics ===
His economic thought can be categorized into Cameralism, which is the German form of Mercantilism. According to Bielfeld, a state's highest purpose is to enrich the well-being of the people in terms of culture, morality, wealth and opulence. Bielfeld argued in favor for educating the people of a state.

As typical for economists of the Enlightenment Bielfeld covered a holistic subject. By creating categories of forces at work, Bielfeld's approach to economics and politics is taxonomic, which is typical for his time. Though it contrasts the simplifying classical approach of David Ricardo and Adam Smith. Since the today dominating classical approach is increasingly questioned, Bielfelds thought is today regaining attractiveness.

Bielfeld emphasizes that for a government it is highly important to stimulate manufacturing proactively. Because the establishment of a manufacturing sector does not arise by its own. He also points out that in order to oversee the complexity of effects that legislation has it is important to consult experts from every economic sector. He also mentions that among different manufacturing sectors there is different importance for establishing them within a Nation. The criterion on which to judge whether or not it is suitable for a government to establish a manufacturing sector is how many people it would employ in relation to what it would cost the government to subsidies this establishment. He also suggests that possible synergies among different manufacturers are to be taken into account.

On public debt, Bielfeld was of the opinion that it would be reasonable for a state to rise public debt because it would bring money into a countries circulation, which would have positive outcomes that would later outweigh manifold. In this point he actually contrasted traditional Mercantilism.

=== Advice on the process of legislation of a government ===
In his work "Institutions Politiques" Bielfeld gives very detailed advise on which professions should take part on a government's process of Legislation. He thereby follows the principle that those Professions that are affected by a regulation should also be present in the council that makes this regulation.

=== On the decline of states ===
In « Institutions politiques » Bielfeld among others deals with the decline of states. He emphasizes on instability as a key character of everything and that the most formidable empires were subject to the law of change and inconstancy. Therefore, it would be of great importance for a statesman to study the history of the decline of states, which he calls "revolutions" including its causes and effects. Bielfeld also explicitly lists 25 causes for a state to decline, which he differentiates among external (8) and internal (17) causes. He also mentions that there are direct and indirect causes for decline.

Reasons for a State to decline
external	internal
migration	unwise constitutions leading to inequity
war	insane sovereign
excessive demand from neighboring states	relaxation of morals (Importance of Morals and Rule of Law
imperial over extension	Excessive Religion
depandency	Oppression / Limits on Liberty
grandiosity of independence	Decline of Production. Neglect of agriculture, commerce, sciences, useful arts and passion for liberal arts and frivolity.
division of empire	Arrogance, pride and idleness.
division of sovereignty	senseless laws
	excessively large colonies
	epidemics and occupational health
	abuse of Spirits and strong Liquors
	Relaxation of military discipline
	Debt
	constant internal wrangling
	interfering with fundamental laws of government
	regicide or assassination of the sovereign

=== Pedagogy ===
Concerning his view on pedagogy Bielfeld can be seen in one line with Emanuel Kant's "sapere aude", because he emphasizes the importance of the formation of an own will rather than the collection of knowledge.

== Publications ==
His main work has made it up to sixteen editions and can be classified into the tradition of the Fürstenspiegel. Most of his work was written in French language and translated into German, English, Spanish, Italian, Portuguese, Dutch and Russian.

Bielfeld published the economic journal “Der Eremit” (The Hermit) from 1767 to 1769.

=== List of Editions of Institutions Politiques ===
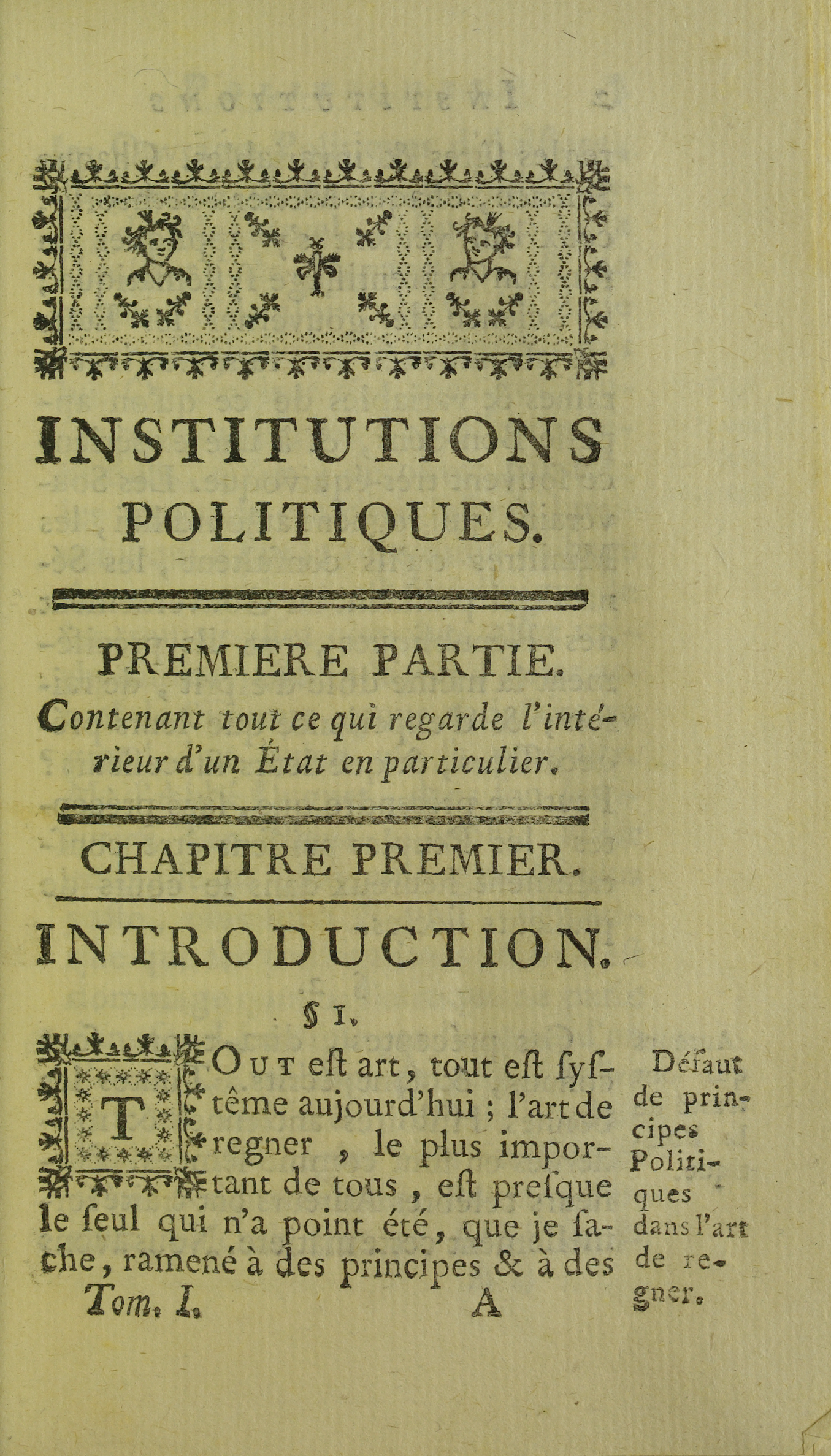
Institutions Politiques, 1762

1. French edition, 1760, La Haye.
  - Institutions Politiques, par Monsieur Le Baron de Bielfeld. Tome premier.
  - Institutions politiques, par Monsieur Le Baron de Bielfeld. Tome second.
  - Institutions politiques, par Monsieur le Baron de Bielfeld. Supplément
2. French edition, 1761, Paris.
  - Institutions politiques, ouvrage où l’on traite de la société civile; des loix, de la police, des finances, du commerce, des forces d’un état; & en général de tout ce qui a rapport au gouvernement. Par M. le Baron de Bielfeld. Nouvelle édition. Tome second.
3. German translation, 1761, Breslau.
  - Des Freyherrn von Bielefeld, Lehrbegriff der Staatskunst, erster Theil
  - Des Freyherrn von Bielefeld, Lehrbegriff der Staatskunst, zweyter Theil. Nebst denen Ergänzungen beyder Theile.
4. French edition, 1762, Paris.
  - Institutions politiques, ouvrage où l’on traite de la société civile; des loix, de la police, des finances, du commerce, des forces d’un état; et en général de tout ce qui a rapport au gouvernement. Par M. le Baron de Bielfeld. Tome premier.
5. German Translation, 1764, Breslau.
6. Italian Translation, 1764.
7. French Edition, 1767, Leide.
  - Institutions politiques, par monsieurl le Baron de Bielfeld. Tome premier.
  - Institutions politiques, par monsieur le Baron de Bielfeld. Tome second.
  - Institutions politiques, par monsieur le Baron de Bielfeld. Tome troisième.
8. Spanish translation, 1767-1801 [v. 1, 1767; v. 2, 1768; v. 3, 1771; v. 4, 1772; v. 5, 1781; v. 6, 1801].
  - Instituciones politicas.
9. French edition, 1768–74
  - Institutions politiques. Nouvelle édition., revue, corrigée & augmentée.
10. German Translation, 1773, Breslau.
  - Des Freyherrn von Bielefeld, Lehrbegriff der Staatskunst. Erster Thei
  - Des Freyherrn von Bielefeld, Lehrbegriff der Staatskunst. Zweiter Theil.
  - Des Freyherrn von Bielefeld, Lehrbegriff der Staatskunst. Dritter Theil.
11. Russian translation, 1768–75, Moscow.
  - Наставления политическия барона Билфелда / Переведены с французскаго языка князь Федором Шаховским.
12. German translation, 1777, Breslau.
13. Dutch translation, 1779
  - Grondbeginselen der staatkunde. Gedeeltelyk gevolgd na het werk van den Baron van Bielefeld, en voorts grootelyks vermeerderd, verbeetered, met noodige aanmerkingen verrykt, en op een geheel nieuwe voet ten dienste en nutte van alle beminaars van fraaye konsten en weetenschappen in de voeglykste en geschiktste order gebracht.
14. Spanish Translation, 1781, Burdéos.
  - Instituciones políticas. Obra en que se trata de los reynos de Portugal, y España, de su situacion local, de sus posesiones, de sus vecinos, y limites, de su clima, y producciones, de sus manufacturas, y fabricas, de su comercio, de los habitantes, y de su numero, de la nobleza, de la forma de su gobierno, de sus departamentos, del soberano, y de sus titulos, y en que se fundan: de la succession al trono, de sus exercitos, y marina; de sus rentas, de la politica general de cada corte, y de la politica particular para con otras potencias. Escrita en idioma frances por el Varon de Bielfeld. Y traducida al castellano, aumentada de muchas notas por Don Valentin de Foronda.
15. German Translation, 1782, Wien.
  - Versuch über das Polizeywesen. Aus dem Französischen übersetzt von Johann Friderich Treitlinger.
16. Portuguese Translation, 1823, Rio de Janeiro.
  - Resumo das Instituições Políticas do Barão de Bielfeld, parafraseadas e acomodadas à forma actual do governo do Império do Brasil, oferecido à mocidade brasiliense por um seu compatriota pernambucano.

=== List of other works (partial) ===
- Worinnen die Wissenschaften, mit welchen sich der Verstand oder die Beurtheilungskraft beschäfftigt, abgehandelt werden; two Volumes.
- Progres des Allemands dans les sciences, les belles-lettres & les arts, particuliérement dans la poësie & l'eloquence. 1752.
- Progrès des Allemands dans les Sciences les Belles-Lettres et les Arts. 1752.
- Progrès des Allemands dans les Sciences, les belles-lettres & les arts, particuliérement dans la poésie, l'eloquence & le théâtre. 1768.
- Lettres familieres. 1763.
- Amusemens Dramatiques De Monsieur De Bielefeld; two Volumes. 1768.
- A Translation of Montesquieu's Considerations on the Causes of the Greatness of the Romans and their Decline into German.
