= Kurtey people =

Ethnic group in West Africa

The Kurtey people (var. Kourtey) are a small ethnic group found along the Niger River valley in parts of the West African nations of Niger, Benin, Mali, and Nigeria. They are also found in considerable numbers in Ghana, Togo, Ivory Coast, and Burkina Faso.

== Assimilation into Songhai ==
The Kurtey were formed from the movement of Fula people into the Niger River valley of modern Tillaberi Region, Niger in the 18th century, and their intermarriage with local Songhai, Zarma, Sorko and others. While retaining many aspects of Fula traditional culture, the Kurtey have assimilated into Songhai-Zarma ways of life and speak a Southern Songhay dialect. Some outside observers consider them a subsection of the Songhai people, while others describe them as communities with distinct histories, cultures, and ethnic self-identification within the larger Songhai speaking social space, of which the Songhai people are only one part.

== Customs and demography ==
They are less than 50,000 in numbers as of today, concentrated on islands and along the Niger river banks near Sansani, Dessa and Ayorou; in Niamey (especially in Koutoukalé quarter); and in villages along the lower middle Niger from Gao to northern Nigeria. Some Kurtey continue to mark themselves with their traditional facial scarification: a small cross at the top of each cheekbone. The Kurtey are also one of six Nigerien ethnic groups who have historically carried out ritual Female circumcision. Kurtey traditionally engage in sedentary cattle raising—a legacy of their Fula ancestry—as well as fishing (like Sorko people), tobacco farming, and riverine flood irrigated millet and rice farming.

== Relations with others ==
In the 19th century, many Muslim Kurtey engaged in slave raiding amongst pagan Zarma along the Niger, earning them the Zarma nickname "Thieves of Men" While they are, historically, bitter rivals of the Wogo people who settled in the same area from the middle Niger beginning around 1800, the two ethnic groups have become closely related, settled in the same areas, speaking similar dialects, and sharing similar ways of life. Both were Muslim before migrating to the area, enjoying close relations with the Fula Emirate of Say.
