= Klaus Wälde =

German economist

Klaus Wälde (born 1966) is a German economist and Professor of Economics at the Johannes-Gutenberg University Mainz. He is also an extramural fellow at the Université catholique de Louvain and a fellow of the CESifo network. Previously, he was Professor of Economics at the Universities of Dresden, Würzburg and Glasgow. He also worked for the World Bank and for the European Commission.

He published on macroeconomics and economic theory, on labour market research and the analysis of the role of emotions in decision making. His evaluations (with Andey Launov) of Hartz III and Hartz IV received quite some interest from the public. He is also supportive of the role of trade unions in society. He teaches in the "Dynamic Aspects of Stress at Work" graduate school at the Johannes-Gutenberg University Mainz. This is an interdisciplinary graduate school of psychologists and economists.

As of March 2020 he contributed to the analysis of COVID-19 dynamics in Germany. Applying methods from labour market theory (continuous time Markov chains) to epidemiology, he developed new versions of the SIR model to predict the evolution of COVID-19 in Germany (GER, CESifo Econ Studies). This received a lot of attention in the media. Earlier analyses also discussed in his Corona-Blog focused on flattening the curve or on the effects of public health measures.

Media responses were strongest for the mask-study. Examples include Tagesschau, ARD Morgenmagazin (ARD Mediathek), Die Zeit, a page 1 news on The Times or De Volkskrant. The published version of the mask-study is among the most noticed scientific articles according to Altmetric.

His most known textbook is titled Applied Intertemporal Optimization, and is a frequently downloaded economics textbook.

Klaus Wälde held a research professorship at the Gutenberg Research College from 2009 to 2014.
