= Bitti Harey =

Traditional dance of the Zarma people

- Inventor: Zarma people
- Origin: Niger

Bitti Harey is a traditional dance of the Zarma people especially that of Zarmaganda in Niger. It is part of the traditional dance to celebrate the end of a good harvest, festivals, wrestling matches and weddings

Bitti Harey is rooted in the cultural tradition of the Zarmaganda. The handling of the elements that make up the instrumental ensemble of Bitti Harey is handled by seasoned actors with perfect knowledge of the rhythm.

The word "Bitti Harey" literally translates into "drum rhythm". The main musical instrument used which is the "bitti" or "kunce háréy", is a double-headed drum similar to but bigger than a dondon and has a cylindrical shape. It is slung in front of the player and played with both hands. The drum is used almost exclusively in the Zarmaganda, the heartland of the Zarma people in Niger between Dosso and Ouallam.
