= Gerhard Grohs =

German sociologist and Africanist

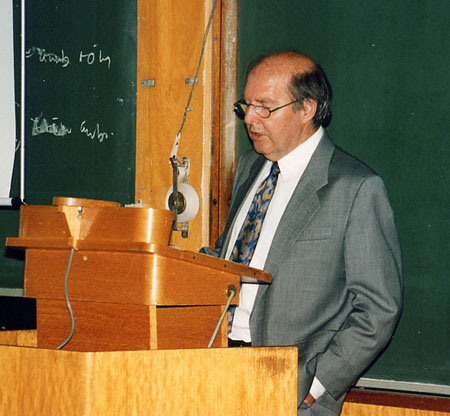
- Grohs in 1995
- Born: 24 June 1929; Dresden, Germany
- Died: 18 February 2015 (aged 85)
- Occupation: Sociologist

Academic background
- Education: Heidelberg University

Academic work
- Discipline: Sociology; Ethnology; Jurist
- Institutions: Free University of Berlin; University of Mainz

Gerhard Grohs (June 24, 1929 – February 18, 2015) was a German sociologist and African studies scholar. He was one of the pioneers of African Studies in Germany, Professor of Sociology at the Free University of Berlin (1969–75) and at the University of Mainz (1975–94).

== Biography ==
From 1950, Grohs first studied law at Heidelberg University and was chairman of the General Student Committee (AStA) there in 1952/53 and 1953/54 second chairman of the Association of German Student Unions (VDS). After completing his doctorate in 1959 with a thesis on Italian collective bargaining law, he completed a second degree in sociology at the Free University of Berlin, which he completed in 1961 with a diploma. In 1966, he habilitated in Berlin with the work Steps of African Emancipation: Studies on the self-image of African elites. After teaching in Berlin, Leicester and Dar es Salaam, Grohs was appointed professor in Berlin in 1969. In 1975, he changed to the professorship for African culture and society at the Institute for Ethnology and African Studies Mainz of the University of Mainz, which he held until his retirement in 1994. Gerhard Grohs succeeded in acquiring Janheinz Jahn's library for the University of Mainz with the support of the Donors' Association of German Industry and the German Research Foundation when he made this a condition of his coming to Mainz at the time.

After retirement, Grohs held teaching positions at the Geschwister-Scholl-Institut of LMU Munich and at the Munich School of Philosophy until 2009.

In addition to his teaching activities, Grohs was involved in church and development policy for many years, e.g., as chairman of the scientific board of trustees of the Research Center of the Evangelical Study Community (FEST) in Heidelberg (until 1999), as a member of the Development Commission and the Central Committee of the World Council of Churches in Geneva and as Chairman of the Chamber for Church Development Service of the Evangelical Church in Germany (EKD) (until 1992). From 1981 to 1990, he was a member of the advisory board of the Friedrich Naumann Foundation.

From 1991 to 1993, Grohs was one of the first members and also chairman of the Association for African Studies in Germany (VAD), which, since its foundation in 1969, has made a significant contribution to the establishment of modern African Studies as an interdisciplinary, politically and socially committed field of study in Germany. Grohs played an important role in developing the scientific and political profile of the VAD, for example through the memorandum "Forcing South Africa to Peace" published in 1986, which called for a more rigorous fight against the Apartheid regime in South Africa.

His daughter de:Henrike Grohs was murdered in 2016 by Islamist terrorists in the Grand-Bassam shootings in Ivory Coast.

== Publications (selection) ==
Articles

- „Frantz Fanon, ein Theoretiker der afrikanischen Revolution“. Kölner Zeitschrift für Soziologie und Sozialpsychologie 16 (3), 457-480.
- The Resettlement of Offenders Act, 1969. Eastern Africa Law Review, vol. 2 (2), pp. 247 –258. 1969
- „Traditionalismus und Sozialismus im tansanischen Strafrecht“. Verfassung und Recht in Übersee, vol.4 (4). 1967
- “Difficulties of Cultural Emancipation in Africa”. Journal of Modern African Studies, vol. 14, pp. 65–78. 1976
- „Kirche und Staat in Südafrika und Namibia“. Africa Spectrum, vol. 83 (3) 1983

Monographs

- Stufen afrikanischer Emanzipation : Studien zum Selbstverständnis westafrikanischer Eliten. Stuttgart: Kohlhammer, 275 S., 1967 (habilitation thesis)
- Zum Wandel der sozialen Funktion afrikanischer Autobiographien. DGS, Bremen, 1981
- Ausdrucksformen kulturellen Protests in Afrika südlich der Sahara. DGS, Zurich : Seismo, 1989

Edited Books

- Theoretische Probleme des Sozialismus in Afrika : Négritude u. Arusha. Declaration. 2nd annual conference d. Association of Africanists in Germany (VAD) 1970. Hamburg: Buske, 288 S. 1971
- as co-editor: Zur Soziologie der Dekolonisation in Afrika. Frankfurt (am Main): Fischer, 298 p.
- as co-editor: Afrika hilft sich selbst. Prozesse und Institutionen der Selbstorganisation. Münster/Hamburg: Lit-Verlag. 1994

== Literature ==
- Brandstetter, Anna-Maria, et Dieter Neubert, 2002: Postkoloniale Transformation in Afrika. Zur Neubestimmung der Soziologie der Dekolonisation (Symposium on the occasion of Gerhard Grohs' 70th birthday, 1999). Hamburg: LIT
- Brandstetter, Anna-Maria, und Carola Lentz, 2006: 60 Jahre Institut für Ethnologie und Afrikastudien. Ein Geburtstagsbuch (Mainzer Beiträge zur Afrikaforschung. 14). Cologne: Köppe
- Dieter Neubert: „Obituary: Gerhard Grohs, 24. Juni 1929 – 18. Februar 2015“. Africa Spectrum, vol. 50 (1), pp. 93–94
