= University of Mainz =

Public university in Mainz, Germany

Johannes Gutenberg University Mainz
- Johannes Gutenberg-Universität Mainz
- Historic Seal of the University of Mainz
- Motto: Ut omnes unum sint German: Dass alle eins seien
- Motto in English: That they all may be one
- Type: Public
- Established: 1477 (University of Mainz); Re-opened; 1946 (Johannes Gutenberg University Mainz)
- Affiliations: U15 RMU
- Budget: € 504 million (2018)
- President: Georg Krausch
- Academic staff: 4,353
- Administrative staff: 7,825
- Students: 32,000
- Location: Mainz, Rhineland Palatinate, Germany; 49°59′32″N 8°14′17″E
- Colors: Red
- Website: uni-mainz.de

- Location within Germany Location within Rhineland-Palatinate

The Johannes Gutenberg University Mainz (German: Johannes Gutenberg-Universität Mainz) is a public research university in Mainz, Rhineland Palatinate, Germany. It has been named after the inventor Johannes Gutenberg since 1946. As of 2018, it had approximately 32,000 students enrolled in around 100 academic programs. The university is organized into 11 faculties.

The university is a member of the German U15, a group of fifteen major research and medical universities in Germany. It also participates in the IT-Cluster Rhine-Main-Neckar and forms part of the Rhine-Main-Universities (RMU) along with Goethe University Frankfurt and Technische Universität Darmstadt. From 2027, the University of Mainz as a part of the Rhine-Main Universities will be inducted into German Excellence Strategy of the Federal and State Governments, a competition for top-level universities research founding.

The first university of Mainz was founded in 1477, it is one of the oldest universities in Europe, although it was later closed and re-founded 148 years later.

== History ==
The first University of Mainz goes back to the Archbishop of Mainz, Prince-elector and Reichserzkanzler Adolf II von Nassau. At the time, establishing a university required papal approval and Adolf II initiated the approval process during his time in office. The university, however, was first opened in 1477 by Adolf's successor to the bishopric, Diether von Isenburg. In 1784 the university was opened up for Protestants and Jews (curator Anselm Franz von Bentzel-Sternau ). It became one of the largest Catholic universities in Europe with ten chairs in theology alone. In the confusion after the establishment of the Mainz Republic of 1792 and its subsequent recapture by the Prussians, academic activity came to a gradual standstill. In 1798 the university became active again under French governance, and lectures in the department of medicine took place until 1823. Only the faculty of theology continued teaching during the 19th century, albeit as a theological seminary (since 1877 "College of Philosophy and Theology").

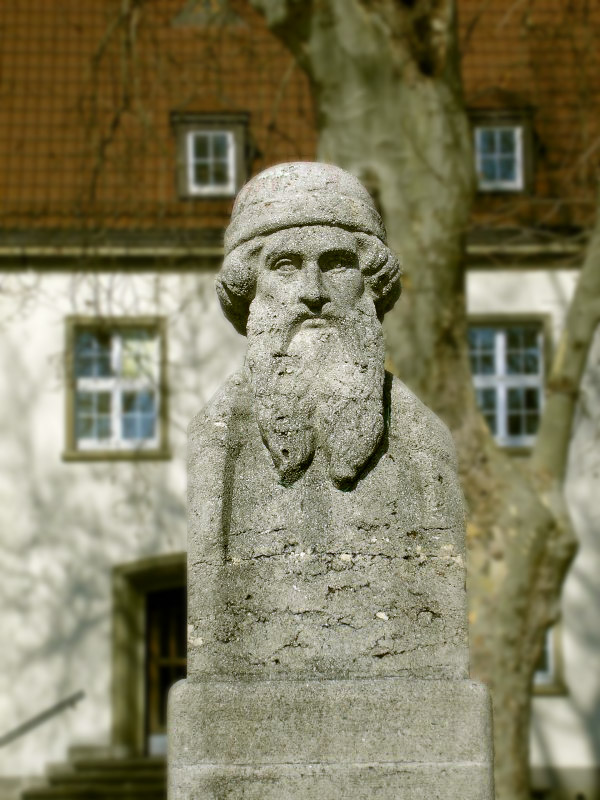
Statue of Johannes Gutenberg at the University of Mainz

The current Johannes Gutenberg University Mainz was founded in 1946 by the French occupying power. In a decree on 1 March the French military government implied that the University of Mainz would continue to exist: the university shall be "enabled to resume its function". The remains of anti-aircraft warfare barracks erected in 1938 after the remilitarization of the Rhineland during the Third Reich served as the university's first buildings and are still in use today.

The continuation of academic activity between the old university and Johannes Gutenberg University Mainz, in spite of an interruption spanning over 100 years, is contested. During the time up to its reopening only a seminary and midwifery college survived.

In 1972, the effect of the 1968 student protests began to take a toll on the university's structure. The departments (Fakultäten) were dismantled and the university was organized into broad fields of study (Fachbereiche). Finally in 1974 Peter Schneider was elected as the first president of what was now a "constituted group-university" institute of higher education. In 1990 Jürgen Zöllner became university president yet spent only a year in the position after he was appointed Minister for "Science and Advanced Education" for the State of Rhineland-Palatinate. As the coordinator for the SPD's higher education policy, this furloughed professor from the Institute for Physiological Chemistry played a decisive role in the SPD's higher education policy and in the development of Study Accounts.

== Faculties ==
The Johannes Gutenberg University Mainz is divided in ten faculties since 7 April 2024.

- Faculty of Catholic and Protestant Theology
- Faculty of Social Sciences, Media, and Sports
- Faculty of Law, Management, and Economics
- University Medicine
- Faculty of Philosophy and Philology
- Faculty of Translation Studies, Linguistics, and Cultural Studies
- Faculty of History and Cultural Studies
- Faculty of Physics, Mathematics and Computer Science
- Faculty of Chemistry, Pharmacy and Geosciences
- Faculty of Biology

The academies for music and art are independent art colleges of the Johannes Gutenberg University, the Hochschule für Musik Mainz and the Kunsthochschule Mainz.

== Campus ==
The University of Mainz is one of few campus universities in Germany. Nearly all its institutions and facilities are located on the site of a former barracks in the south west part of the city. The university medical centre is located off campus, as is the Department of Applied Linguistics and Cultural Sciences, which was integrated with the university in 1949 and is located in Germersheim. On campus next to the university is the Max Planck Institute for Chemistry, the Max Planck Institute for Polymer Research, the Institute of Molecular Biology, the electron accelerator MAMI, the research reactor TRIGA, the botanical garden, a sports stadium and an indoor swimming pool. Mainz Academy of Arts (Kunsthochschule Mainz) is located off campus.

== Academic profile ==
The range of studies is comprehensive; the university lacks some technical studies, veterinary medicine and nutrition science. One can nonetheless study the theology, history of books, athletics, music, visual arts, theatre, and film.

Today the Johannes Gutenberg University Mainz has approximately 36,000 students (as of 2010) and consists of over 150 institutions and clinics. The university offers international programs, such as the award-winning choir EuropaChorAkademie, founded by Joshard Daus in 1997, in collaboration with the University of the Arts Bremen.

One of the instruments carried by the Mars Exploration Rovers Spirit and Opportunity, a miniature Mössbauer spectrometer, was developed at the university.

The University of Mainz does currently levy fees or tuition (Studiengebühren) for a regular course of study. Senior citizen students, auditing students, and certain postgraduate students may be subject to higher fees.

== Rankings ==
University rankings

Overall – Global & National
QS World 2024	464	27
THE World 2024	251–300	25–31
ARWU World 2023	201–300	10–19

As per the QS World University Rankings for 2024, the university holds the 464th position worldwide and is placed 27th nationally. On the Times Higher Education World University Rankings, it finds itself within the 251–300 range globally, and falls within the 25–31 range on a national scale in the 2024 edition. In terms of the ARWU World Rankings for 2022, the university is positioned in the 201–300 band internationally, and ranks between 10th and 19th in the country.

According to the report of the German Research Foundation (DFG) from 2018, the University of Mainz is one of the best universities in natural sciences in Germany. In the period under review from 2014 to 2016, the University of Mainz received the highest number of competitive grants in the natural sciences. The university also achieved the first place in physics. In a competitive selection process, the DFG selects the best research projects from researchers at universities and research institutes and finances them. The ranking is thus regarded as an indicator of the quality of research.

=== By subject ===
QS World University Rankings by Subject 2023
Subject	Global	National
Arts & Humanities	283	15
Linguistics	151–200	▼11–14
Archaeology	101–150	▼9–12
English Language and Literature	201–250	▼8–9
Modern Languages	201–250	▲10–13
Engineering and Technology	N/A	N/A
Engineering – Chemical	201–250	▼9–10
Life Sciences & Medicine	N/A	N/A
Pharmacy and Pharmacology	▲74	▲4
Natural Sciences	▲175	13
Chemistry	▲151–200	13–14
Physics and Astronomy	▲112	9
Social Sciences & Management	N/A	N/A
Communication and Media Studies	101–150	3–7

THE World University Rankings by Subject 2023
Subject	Global	National
Arts & humanities	▼251–300	▼21–27
Education	▼501–600	▼27
Social sciences	201–250	▼14–17
Clinical & health	301–400	▼21–25
Life sciences	▲201–250	▲20–25
Physical sciences	▲151–175	▲12–15
Psychology	▲201–250	20–23

ARWU Global Ranking of Academic Subjects 2022
Subject	Global	National
Natural Sciences
Mathematics	301–400	19–29
Physics	51–75	3–5
Chemistry	201–300	▲16–25
Earth Sciences	151–200	▼13–16
Atmospheric Science	76–100	2–6
Engineering
Biomedical Engineering	101–150	6–10
Materials Science & Engineering	▼301–400	▲16–21
Nanoscience & Nanotechnology	201–300	▼8–17
Environmental Science & Engineering	▼401–500	▼22–28
Life Sciences
Biological Sciences	201–300	▼20–30
Human Biological Sciences	▼76–100	▼9–12
Medical Sciences
Clinical Medicine	301–400	▲23–30
Dentistry & Oral Sciences	201–300	▲22–28
Medical Technology	201–300	▲24–30
Pharmacy & Pharmaceutical Sciences	76–100	▼7–9
Social Sciences
Political Sciences	201–300	▼13–16
Communication	▲34	2
Psychology	▲151–200	▲12–17

== Notable people ==
=== Old University ===
- Johann Joachim Becher, physician, professor of medicine 1663–1664
- Johann Friedrich von Pfeiffer, economist, professor of cameral science 1784–1787
- Andreas Joseph Hofmann, professor of law 1784–1793, president of the first democratically elected parliament in Germany
- Samuel Thomas von Sömmerring, professor of anatomy and physiology 1784–1797
- Georg Forster, naturalist and world traveller, university librarian 1788–1793
- Klemens von Metternich, German statesman and diplomat, studied law between 1790–1792

=== Professors (post 1946) ===
- Karl-Otto Apel (philosophy)
- Kai Arzheimer (political science)
- Thomas Bierschenk (ethnology and sociology)
- Herbert Braun (theology)
- Hauke Brunkhorst (education)
- Micha Brumlik (education)
- Paul J. Crutzen (chemistry, Nobel Prize 1995)
- Fritz Strassmann (physics)
- Jürgen Falter (political science)
- Hans Galinsky (American studies)
- Gerhard Grohs (African studies) (Sociology) (1975–1994)
- Leopold Horner (chemistry)
- Alfred Kröner (geology)
- Karl Cardinal Lehmann (theology)
- Carola Lentz (social anthropologist)
- Thomas Metzinger (philosophy)
- Gottfried Münzenberg (physics)
- Elisabeth Noelle-Neumann (communication studies)
- W. Pannenberg (theology)
- Rolf Peffekoven (economics)
- Klaus Rose (economics)
- Dorothee Sölle (theology)
- Beatrice Weder di Mauro (economics)
- Isabel Schnabel (economics)
- Fritz Straßmann (nuclear chemistry, discovered nuclear fission with Otto Hahn)
- Werner Weidenfeld (political science, former adviser of German chancellor Helmut Kohl)
- Jürgen Gauß (theoretical chemistry)
- Uğur Şahin (medicine)
- Özlem Türeci (medicine)
- Klaus Wälde (economics)

=== Alumni ===
Alumni of the old University include theologian Friedrich Spee as well as Austrian diplomat Klemens von Metternich, who studied law from 1790 to 1792, and revolutionary Adam Lux.

Among notable alumni from the post-1946 University of Mainz are German politicians Malu Dreyer (SPD, Minister President of Rhineland-Palatinate); Rainer Brüderle (FDP, Federal Minister for Economics and Technology); Horst Teltschik (former security advisor to Chancellor Helmut Kohl and president of the Munich Conference on Security Policy); Kristina Schröder, Federal Minister of Family and Social Affairs; Franz Josef Jung (CDU, Former Federal Minister of Labor and Social Affairs and former Federal Minister of Defence); Jens Beutel, Oberbürgermeister (mayor) of Mainz; particle physicist Vera Lüth; nuclear and particle physicist Johanna Stachel; sculptor Karlheinz Oswald; sports journalist Béla Réthy; political journalist Peter Scholl-Latour; Dieter Stolte, former director-general of ZDF; soprano Elisabeth Scholl; a founder of American avant-garde cinema Jonas Mekas; his brother Adolfas Mekas, film director, writer and educator; mural artist Rainer Maria Latzke; the German climatologist Wolfgang Seiler; Abbas Zaryab, notable Iranian scholar and historian; Indonesian Toraja Church pastor and politician, Ishak Pamumbu Lambe; Srinivas Kishanrao Saidapur, an Indian reproductive biologist; American educator Biddy Martin; Stanisław Potrzebowski, one of leaders of the ridnovir movement in Poland; German opera singer Christine Esterházy; and Ruth Katharina Martha Pfau, nun, physician and writer who devoted more than 50 years of her life to fighting leprosy in Pakistan.

== See also ==
- List of medieval universities
- List of universities in Germany
