= Thomas Bierschenk =

German ethnologist

- Born: 18 July 1951 (age 75); Linz am Rhein, Germany
- Title: Prof. Dr.

Academic background
- Education: Free University of Berlin; Bielefeld University
- Doctoral advisor: Georg Elwert

Academic work
- Discipline: Anthropology; Ethnology; Sociology
- Institutions: University of Mainz; Bielefeld University; Free University of Berlin

Thomas Bierschenk (born June 18, 1951, in Linz am Rhein) is a German ethnologist and sociologist. He is Professor of African Cultures and Societies at the Institute for Anthropology and African Studies at the University of Mainz.

== Biography ==
Bierschenk passed his Abitur at the Friedrich-Wilhelm-Gymnasium (Trier) in 1970. In 1977 he completed his studies in history and sociology at the University Bielefeld and received his doctorate in sociology in 1983, also at this university. This was followed by his post-doctoral thesis at the Free University of Berlin (1991). He studied at the University of Trier, St Peter's College, Oxford (GB), the London School of Economics, the School of Oriental and African Studies (SOAS) in London, the Bordeaux Montaigne University and the University Bielefeld.

Before coming to Mainz in 1997, Thomas Bierschenk taught and researched at Georgetown University in Washington, D.C., the University Bielefeld, the Free University of Berlin, the École des Hautes Études en Sciences Sociales (EHESS) in Marseille and at the University of Hohenheim in Stuttgart . He also held guest professorships at the University of Bonn (2001/02) and the Uppsala University (2006). In 2007/08 he was Theodor Heuss Professor at The New School for Social Research in New York.

From 1994 to 1998, Thomas Bierschenk was Secretary General and then Chairman of the Association Euro-Africaine pour l'Anthropologie du Développement et du Changement Social (Euro-African Association for the Anthropology of Social Change and Development) (APAD). From 2008 to 2010 he held the office of Chairman of the Association for African Studies in Germany e.V. (VAD). He was a member of the scientific advisory board of the Federal Ministry for Economic Cooperation and Development (BMZ) (2004-2010) and is a member of the editorial advisory board of the de:Zeitschrift für Ethnologie (Berlin) and the scientific advisory board of the journal Africa Spectrum (Hamburg). He is also on the advisory board of the African Power and Politics Program of the Overseas Development Institute (ODI, London) and Chair of the Scientific Advisory Board of the “Laboratoire d'études et des recherches sur les dynamiques sociales et le développement local” (LASDEL, Niamey, Niger). In 2010 he was awarded the Chevalier de l'Ordre National du Bénin by the government of the Republic of Benin for his services to German-African scientific cooperation.

== Research focus ==
His current research interests are on public service and civil servant practices in Africa (within the framework of the international research project “States at Work”). (1) “Public Services and Civil Servants in West Africa: Education and Justice in Benin, Ghana, Mali and Niger” and (2) “The State as a Construction Site. Civil Service and Civil Servants: Education and Justice in Benin, Ghana, Mali and Niger”. He is also involved in the project “Significations of Oil and Social Change in Niger and Chad: An anthropological cooperative research project on technologies and processes of creative adaptation in relation to African oil production” (coordination: Prof. Nicholaus Schareika, Göttingen; Dr. Andrea Behrends, Halle). He has conducted extensive field research in the Sultanate of Oman and in West and Central Africa. Topics were initially the social impact of oil production in Oman, later the social organization of the Fulani in West Africa and decentralization and the local state in West and Central Africa. He is also particularly interested in the ethnological analysis of development.

== Publications (selection) ==
- States at Work. Dynamics of African Bureaucracies. Leiden: Brill, 2014, ed. with Jean-Pierre Olivier de Sardan.
- Ethnologie im 21. Jahrhundert. Berlin: Reimer, 2013, ed. with Matthias Krings & Carola Lentz.
- Afrika seit 1960. Kontinuitäten, Brüche, Perspektiven. Cologne: Köppe, 2012, ed. with Eva Spies.
- 50 Years of Independence in Africa. Africa Spectrum, 45 (3) (2010). Hamburg: GIGA, ed. with Eva Spies.
- Democratisation without development: Benin 1989–2009. International Journal of Politics, Culture, and Society 22 (3) (2009): 337–357.
- The every-day functioning of an African public service: Informalization, privatization and corruption in Benin’s legal system. Journal of Legal Pluralism and Unofficial Law 57 (2008): 101–139.
- Islam und Entwicklung in Afrika. Köln: Köppe, ed. with Marion Fischer, 2007.
- Powers in the Village. Rural Benin between democratisation and decentralisation. Africa, 73 (2003): 145–173, with Jean-Pierre Olivier de Sardan.
- Courtiers en développement. Les villages africaines en quête des projets. Paris: Karthala, 2000, ed. with J.-P. Olivier de Sardan & J.-P. Chauveau.
- Les pouvoirs au village: le Bénin rural entre démocratisation et décentralisation. ed. with Jean-Pierre Olivier de Sardan, Paris: Karthala, 1998.

== Literature ==
- Nikolaus Schareika, Eva Spies, Pierre-Yves Le Meur (eds.): Auf dem Boden der Tatsachen. Festschrift für Thomas Bierschenk (= Mainzer Beiträge zur Afrikaforschung. Bd. 28). Köln: Köppe, 2011.
