= Johann Friedrich von Pfeiffer =

Johann Friedrich von Pfeiffer (7 October 1718 – 5 March 1787) was one of the most important German figures of political economy of the 18th century along with Philipp von Hörnigk and Johann Heinrich Gottlob von Justi. He was a leading practitioner in Cameralism (Cameral science) and mercantilism.

== Life ==
Von Pfeiffer was born in 1718 in Berlin and was the son of a Prussian official who administered royal property (Domänenverwaltung). He was a brilliant and skillful practitioner in the new art of his day known as Cameralism (Cameral science) and he was to develop land as a particular theorist of the absolutist Economics policy, a requirement of the day, equally successfully. In the Prussian civil service, von Pfeiffer rose to the position of privy councilor and from 1747 to 1750 von organized the settlement of smallholders and the construction of 150 villages in the Frederick William I of Prussia settlement policy in the Mark Brandenburg district (Kurmark). After that, he was employed in changing the small German states. He worked from 1778 to 1781 in Hanau on the improvement of agriculture and the manufacturing system.

He wrote numerous works on widespread subjects, such as forestry and finance, agriculture, carbonization of bituminous coal, and means of improving the bliss of Germany. In 1784 he published his six-volume work Corrections famous State, financial, police, Cameral, Commerzbank(commercial banks), and economic writings of this century.

In the same year, he was appointed by Friedrich Karl Joseph von Erthal as a professor on the part of the reform of the University of Mainz as a newly established specialist in Cameral science or public administration as it later becomes known. The course provided its students with a four-year study that included subjects such as U.S. history, natural law, applied mathematics, law, statistics, chemistry, agriculture and forestry, finance, trade, and public administration. The goal was not only the strengthening of state power through better economic performance, he wanted to join the advocacy of the principle of law and for a mutual understanding preparing international policy for the possibility of offensive wars.

Von Pfeiffer died in Mainz.
