= IDS Bulletin =

- Discipline: Area studies, development studies
- Language: English

Publication details
- Former names: Institute of Development Studies Bulletin; The IDS Bulletin
- History: 1968–present
- Publisher: Institute of Development Studies at The University of Sussex
- Frequency: Bimonthly
- Open access: 2016-present
- Impact factor: 0.319 (2017)

Standard abbreviations
- ISO 4: IDS Bull.

Indexing
- ISSN: 0265-5012 (print); 1759-5436 (web)
- LCCN: 89645832
- OCLC no.: 12879804

Links
- Journal homepage; Online access; Online archive

IDS Bulletin is a bi-annual peer-reviewed academic journal published by Institute of Development Studies (IDS). It was previously co-published with Wiley-Blackwell between 2009 and 2015. The journal was established in 1968 as the Institute of Development Studies Bulletin, which was changed to The IDS Bulletin in 1976 and obtained its current name in 1984. The journal covers topics in international development. IDS Bulletin publishes articles influenced by research from IDS programs and events. In 2016 all journal content is open access therefore available free of charge online to the public without a paywall. Associated titles include IDS Practice Papers, IDS Research Reports, and IDS Working Papers.

According to the Journal Citation Reports, the journal has a 2017 impact factor of 0.319, ranking it 54th out of 68 journals in the category "Area Studies" and 56th out of 57 journals in the category "Planning & Development".
