= Rhine-Main-Universities =

German university alliance

RHINE-MAIN UNIVERSITIES (RMU)
- Formation: 2015; 11 years ago
- Students: 90,000+ students (winter semester 2024/25)
- Website: www.rhein-main-universitaeten.de

The Rhine-Main Universities (RMU), in German Rhein-Main-Universitäten, is a strategic alliance of the Johannes Gutenberg University Mainz, Johann Wolfgang Goethe-University Frankfurt am Main and Technische Universität Darmstadt. The Rhine-Main universities are situated in close vicinity to one another in the Frankfurt/Rhine-Main metropolitan region and offer a wide range of disciplines from medicine and natural sciences to humanities and social sciences through to engineering. With more than 90,000 students and 1,500 professors, they work closely in the areas of research, study and teaching, people, and exchange.

== Study and Teaching ==
More than 90,000 students in 500 degree programs are currently enrolled at the Rhine-Main Universities (RMU).

The Rhine-Main Universities currently offer ten joint degree programs:

- Biomedical Engineering (B.Sc., M.Sc.)
- Political Theory (M.A.)
- International Studies/ Peace and Conflict Studies (M.A.)
- Children's Literature/ Book Studies (M.A.)
- Protestant Theological Studies (continuing education program)
- African Languages, Media and Communication (B.A.)
- Soft Matter and Materials (M.Sc.)
- Particle Accelerator Science (M.Sc.)
- Urban Studies (M.A.).

The RMU Study Program established by the Rhine-Main Universities (RMU) in the winter semester 2020/21 extends the study opportunities of their students by an additional range of selected courses. Students are invited to join the RMU Study Program free of charge and thus enroll simultaneously at up to three universities in two German states. The idea behind the RMU Study Program is that it enables students to supplement the degree program they are currently studying at their home university. The students are also able to sit examinations and earn credit points for any courses they take within the RMU Study Program.

With the RMU Initiative Funding for Teaching, the Rhine-Main Universities support collaborations for the development of new, attractive study offers, for the cooperative further development of the existing curricular offers and for the joint testing of innovative teaching/learning formats. The call for proposals is for two funding formats:

1. Study offers,
2. Thinking Tomorrow's Teaching Today.

== Research ==
The Rhine-Main Universities are working together to enhance their research profiles and develop joint projects and research networks. 39 Collaborative Research Centres and Transregios funded by the German Research Foundation (DFG) are located at the RMU.

With the Initiative Funding for Research, the RMU promotes joint research projects. The RMU Initiative Funding for Research consists of the following funding lines to support

- networking in innovative projects
- networking between scientists in the early career phase,
- the development of new, promising research fields in the medium term that emerge within the RMU through new interactions across the boundaries between disciplines.

A total of five of the cluster initiatives submitted by the Rhine-Main Universities will receive funding in the Excellence Strategy of the German federal and state governments since 2026 onwards:

TU Darmstadt

- Reasonable Artificial Intelligence (RAI)
- The Adaptive Mind (TAM), a joint proposal with Justus Liebig University Giessen and Philipps University Marburg

Johannes Gutenberg University Mainz

- Precision Physics, Fundamental Interactions and Structure of Matter (PRISMA++)

Goethe University Frankfurt

- SCALE
- Cardio-Pulmonary Institute (CPI), jointly with Justus Liebig University Giessen

From 2027, the Rhine-Main Universities will be inducted into German Excellence Strategy of the Federal and State Governments, a competition for top-level universities research founding.

== Short overview ==
Numbers to the alliance are:

- 1,500 Professorships (2024)
- 14,500 graduates (2024)
- 1,737 PhD graduates (2024)
- 45 non-university research institutions (2024)
- 635 million euros of competitive funding (2024)
- 39 DFG Collaborative Research Centres (2024: CRC plus CRC-Transregio)
- 19 DFG Research Training Groups (2024)
- 12 new ERC grants (2024)
