= Zarma people =

Ethnic group in West Africa

Zarma borey زَرمَبࣷرَيْ
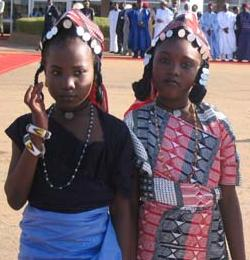
- Young girls wearing traditional Zarma dress

Total population
- 5,162,323

Regions with significant populations
- Niger: 5,004,423
- Nigeria: 113,000
- Benin: 38,000
- Ghana: 6,900
- Burkina Faso: 1,100

Languages
- Zarma (native language), French, English (colonial languages)

Religion
- Islam

Related ethnic groups
- Songhay

- Person: Zarmaboro / زَرمَبࣷرࣷ
- People: Zarma borey / زَرمَبࣷرَيْ
- Language: Zarma ciine / زَرْمَ ݘِينٜ

The Zarma people are an ethnic group predominantly found in westernmost Niger. They are also found in significant numbers in the adjacent areas of Nigeria and Benin, along with smaller numbers in Burkina Faso, Ivory Coast, Ghana, Togo, and Sudan. In Niger, the Zarma are often considered by outsiders to be of the same ethnicity as the neighboring Songhaiborai, although the two groups claim differences, having different histories and speaking different dialects. They are sometimes lumped together as the Zarma-Songhay or Songhay-Zarma.

The Zarma people are predominantly Muslims of the Maliki-Sunni school, and they live in the arid Sahel lands, along the Niger River valley which is a source of irrigation, forage for cattle herds, and drinking water. Relatively prosperous, they own cattle, sheep, goats and dromedaries, renting them out to the Fulani people or Tuareg people for tending. The Zarma people have had a history of slave and caste systems, like many West African ethnic groups. Like them, they also have had a historical musical tradition.

The Zarma people are alternatively referred to as Zerma, Zaberma, Zabarma Zabermawa, Djerma, Dyerma, Jerma, or other terms. Zarma is the term used by the Zarma people themselves.

== Demographics and language ==
The estimates for the total population of Zarma people as of 2013 has been generally placed over three million, but it varies. They constitute several smaller ethnic sub-groups, who were either indigenous to the era prior to the Songhai Empire and have assimilated into the Zarma people, or else are people of Zarma origins who have differentiated themselves some time in the precolonial period (through dialect, political structure, or religion), but these are difficult to differentiate according to Fuglestad. Groups usually referred to as part of the Zarma or Songhay, but who have traceable historical distinctions include the Gabda, Tinga, Sorko, Kalles, Golles, Loqas and Kurtey peoples.

The Zarma language is one of the southern Songhai languages, a branch of the Nilo-Saharan language family. Because of the common language and culture, they are sometimes referred to as "Zarma Songhay" (each also may be spelled "Djerma" and "Songhai").

== History ==
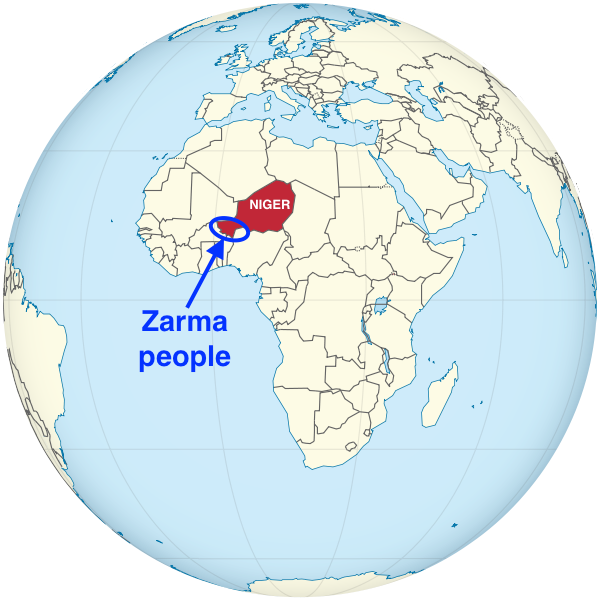
The geographic distribution of Zarma people (approx.).

=== Origins ===
Zarma oral traditions place their origins in the Niger Bend region of Mali. Some describe the Zarma as originally Mande or Soninke. Historian Dierk Lange has argued that these legends are accurate, pointing to Mande words in the Zarma language. Other scholars, however, believe them to have been part of the broader Songhai ethnic umbrella since the beginning.

=== Migration ===
The Zarma migrated south-eastward into their current geographic concentration during the Songhai Empire period, settling particularly in what is now southwest Niger near the capital Niamey. According to legend, this migration was led by Mali Bero, who migrated by flying on a magical millet silo bottom. He decided to migrate with his people following a fight between the Zarma and a neighboring Tuareg village.

Using this oral tradition as evidence, Lange has argued that the Zarma were the ruling class of the Gao Empire, later a vassal of the Mali Empire. In the early 14th century they were defeated by the rising Sonni dynasty, founders of the Songhai Empire. The surviving Za became the leaders of small Zarma principalities. Some helped Askia Muhammad overthrow Sonni Baru in 1493, but did not return to power.

After leaving Gao, the Zarma first settled in the Zarmaganda, later expanding south into the Dallol Bosso valley and Dosso by the 17th century. Forming a number of small communities, each led by a chief or ruler called Zarmakoy, these polities were in conflict for economically and agriculturally attractive lands with the Tuareg people, the Fula people and other ethnic groups in the area.

The Zabarma Emirate was founded by itinerant Zarma preachers and horse traders in the 19th century military, eventually conquering much of the voltaic plateau (southern Burkina Faso, northern Ghana).

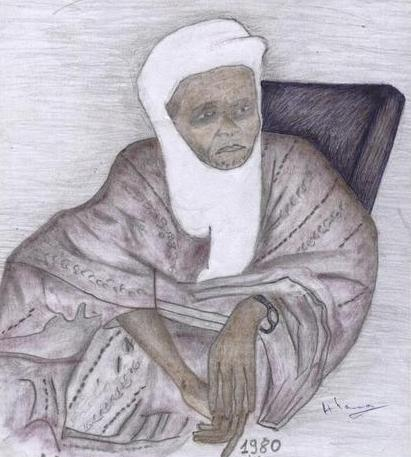
Clothing of an aristocratic Zarma

=== Slavery ===
The slave trade and slave raiding were historically important parts of the society and economy of the Niger river valley, and there is textual evidence annual raids undertaken by Sunni 'Ali and Askiya Muhammad to capture slaves, for domestic use and export to North Africa.

Sahelian societies, including the Zarma, have historically been based on slavery from far before colonialism. According to Jean-Pierre Olivier de Sardan, slaves accounted for two-thirds to three-quarters of the total population of the Songhay-Zarma people, similar proportions to other ethnic groups in pre-colonial West Africa. However, Bruce Hall cautions that while it is "certainly true that the majority of population" had a servile status, these colonial era estimates for "slaves" may exaggerate because there is a difference between servile status and true slavery.

Slaves were an economic asset used for farming, herding and domestic work. A system of social stratification developed even among the slaves, and this status system survived even after slavery was officially abolished during French colonial rule.

=== Colonial era ===
The French came to regions inhabited by the Zarma people at the end of the 1890s, during a period of intra-ethnic conflict. The French established a partnership with the Zarmakoy Aouta of Dosso, building a military post there in November 1898. From 1901 to 1903 the area was plagued by natural disasters such as famines and locust attacks, as the French increased their presence. The French relied on the Dosso post and Niger river valley as supply hubs as they attempted to establish their colonial control all the way to Chad. This led to conflicts with the Zarma people.

French colonial rulers established mines throughout West Africa staffed with African labor, many of whom were migrant Zarma people. Thousands of Zarma travelled to various mines, as well as to build roads and railroads. These laborers followed pre-colonial raiding pathways towards the Gold coast, with colonial mines provided economic opportunities and a means to escape French economic exploitation.

Of the various ethnic groups in Niger, the early cooperation of the Zarma elite with the colonizers led to a legacy where Zarma interests have been promoted, and they have continued to compose an important part of the Nigerien political elite after independence in 1960.

== Society and culture ==
The language, society and culture of the Zarma people is barely distinguishable from the Songhai people.Some scholars consider the Zarma people to be a part of and the largest ethnic sub-group of the Songhai – a group that includes nomads of Mali speaking the same language as the Zarma. Some study the group together as Zarma-Songhai people. However, both groups see themselves as two different people.

=== Social stratification ===
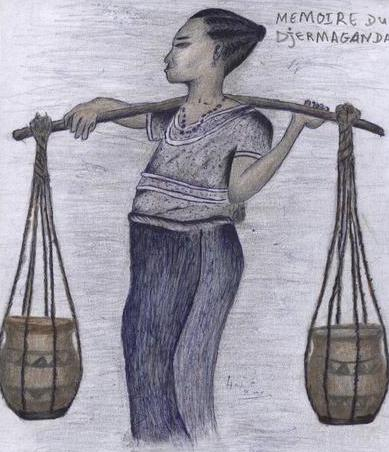
A Zarma woman

Jean-Pierre Olivier de Sardan, Tal Tamari and other scholars have stated that the Zarma people have traditionally been a socially stratified society, like the Songhai people at large, with their society featuring castes. According to the medieval and colonial era descriptions, their vocation is hereditary, and each stratified group has been endogamous. The social stratification has been unusual in two ways; one it embedded slavery, wherein the lowest strata of the population inherited slavery, and second the Zima or priests and Islamic clerics had to be initiated but did not automatically inherit that profession, making the cleric strata a pseudo-caste. According to Ralph Austen, a professor emeritus of African history, the caste system among the Zarma people was not as well developed as the caste system historically found in the African ethnic groups further west to them.

Louis Dumont, the 20th-century author famous for his classic Homo Hierarchicus, recognized the social stratification among Zarma-Songhai people as well as other ethnic groups in West Africa, but suggested that sociologists should invent a new term for West African social stratification system. Other scholars consider this a bias and isolationist because the West African system shares all elements in Dumont's system, including economic, ritual, spiritual, endogamous, elements of pollution, segregative and spread over a large region. According to Anne Haour – a professor of African Studies, some scholars consider the historic caste-like social stratification in Zarma-Songhai people to be a pre-Islam feature while some consider it derived from the Arab influence.

Caste-based servitude
The traditional form of caste-based servitude was still practiced by the Tuareg, Zarma and Arab ethnic minorities.

— Country Report: Niger (2008)
US State Department

The different strata of the Zarma-Songhai people have included the kings and warriors, the scribes, the artisans, the weavers, the hunters, the fishermen, the leather workers and hairdressers (Wanzam), and the domestic slaves (Horso, Bannye). Each caste reveres its own guardian spirit. Some scholars such as John Shoup list these strata in three categories: free (chiefs, farmers and herders), servile (artists, musicians and griots), and the slave class. The servile group were socially required to be endogamous, while the slaves could be emancipated over four generations. The traditionally free strata of the Zerma people have owned property and herds, and these have dominated the political system and governments during and after the French colonial rule. Within the stratified social system, the Islamic system of polygynous marriages is a part of the Zarma people tradition, with preferred partners being cross cousins, and a system of ritualistic acceptance between co-wives. This endogamy is similar to other ethnic groups in West Africa.

=== Female genital mutilation ===
The women among Zarma people, like other ethnic groups of Sahel and West Africa, have traditionally practiced female genital mutilation (FGM). However, the prevalence rates have been lower and falling. According to UNICEF and the World Health Organization studies, in Zarma culture the female circumcision is called Haabize. It consists of two rituals. One is ritual cutting away the hymen of new born girls, second is clitoridectomy between the ages of 9 and 15 where either her prepuce is cut out or a part to all of clitoris and labia minora is cut then removed. The operation has been ritually done by the traditional barbers called wanzam.

Niger has attempted to end the FGM practice. According to UNICEF, these efforts have successfully and noticeably reduced the practice to a prevalence rate in the single digits (9% in Zarma ethnic group in 2006), compared to east-North Africa (Egypt to Somalia) where the FGM rates are very high.

=== Livelihood ===
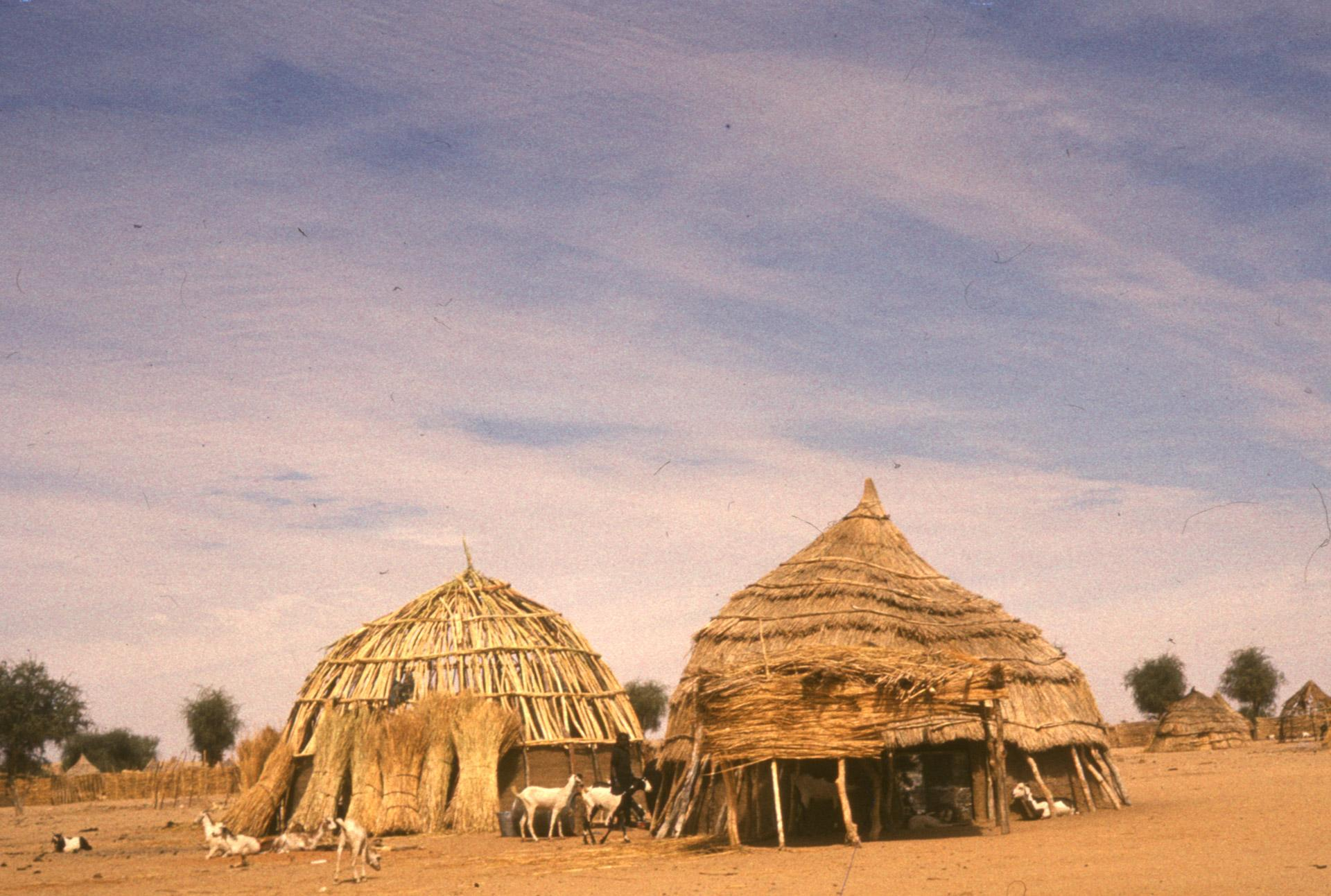
The traditional round Zarma hut near Niamey, Niger.

The Zarma villages traditionally consist of walled off compounds where a family group called windi lives. Each compound has a head male and a compound may have several separate huts, each hut with the different wives of the head male. The huts are traditionally roundhouses, or circular shaped structures made of mud walls with a thatched straw conical roof.

The Zarma people grow maize, millet, sorghum, rice, tobacco, cotton and peanuts during the rainy season (June to November). They have traditionally owned herds of animals, which they rent out to others till they are ready to be sold for meat. Some own horses, a legacy of those Zerma people who historically belonged to the warrior class and were skilled cavalrymen in Islamic armies. Living along the River Niger, some Zarma people rely on fishing. The property inheritance and occupational descent is patrilineal. Many Zarma people, like Songhai, have migrated into coastal and prospering cities of West Africa, especially Ghana. Zarma people also grow guavas, mangoes, bananas, and citrus fruits.

=== Arts ===
The Zarma people, like their neighboring ethnic groups in West Africa, have a rich tradition of music, group dance known as Bitti Harey and singing. The common musical instruments that accompany these arts include gumbe (big drum), dondon (talking drums), molo or kuntigui (string instruments), goge (violin-like instrument). Some of this music also accompanies with folley, or spirit possession-related rituals.

== See also ==
- Songhaiborai
- Caste systems in Africa
- Mande people
- Mandinka people
- Tuareg people
- Zabarma Emirate - a Zarma Islamic state set up in the 19th century in Northern Ghana

== Sources ==
- Austen, Ralph A. (1999), In Search of Sunjata: The Mande Oral Epic as History, Literature and Performance, Indiana University Press, p. 124, ISBN 0-253-21248-0
- Cordell, Dennis D.; Gregory, Joel (1994). African Population and Capitalism: Historical Perspectives. University of Wisconsin Press. ISBN 978-0-299-14274-2.
- Cushman, Amanda (2010). Zarma Folktales of Niger. Quale. ISBN 978-0-9792999-8-8.
- Hall, Bruce S. (2011). A History of Race in Muslim West Africa, 1600–1960. Cambridge University Press. ISBN 978-1-139-49908-8.
- Lange, Dierk (1994), "From Mande to Songhay: Towards a political and ethnic history of medieval Gao", Journal of African History, 35 (2): 275–301, doi:10.1017/s0021853700026438, JSTOR 183220, S2CID 153657364.
- Amadou, Safiatou; Pedrosa, José Manuel (2005). Cuentos maravillosos de las orillas del río Níger: Tradiciones orales del pueblo Djerma-Songay (in Spanish). Miraguano Ediciones.
