= Askia Muhammad I =

First ruler of the Askia dynasty of the Songhai Empire

- Askia
- Reign: April 1493 – 1528
- Predecessor: Sunni Baru
- Successor: Askia Musa
- Born: c. 1443
- Died: c. 1538 (aged 94–95); Gao, Songhai Empire
- Burial: Tomb of Askia, Gao, Mali
- Issue: Askia Musa, Askia Isma'il, Askia Ishaq I, Askia Dawud, hawah, Fatimatu and 465 other children
Names
- Muhammad ibn Abi Bakr al-Turi
- Dynasty: Askia dynasty
- Father: Abi Bakr
- Mother: Kassey
- Religion: Sunni Islam

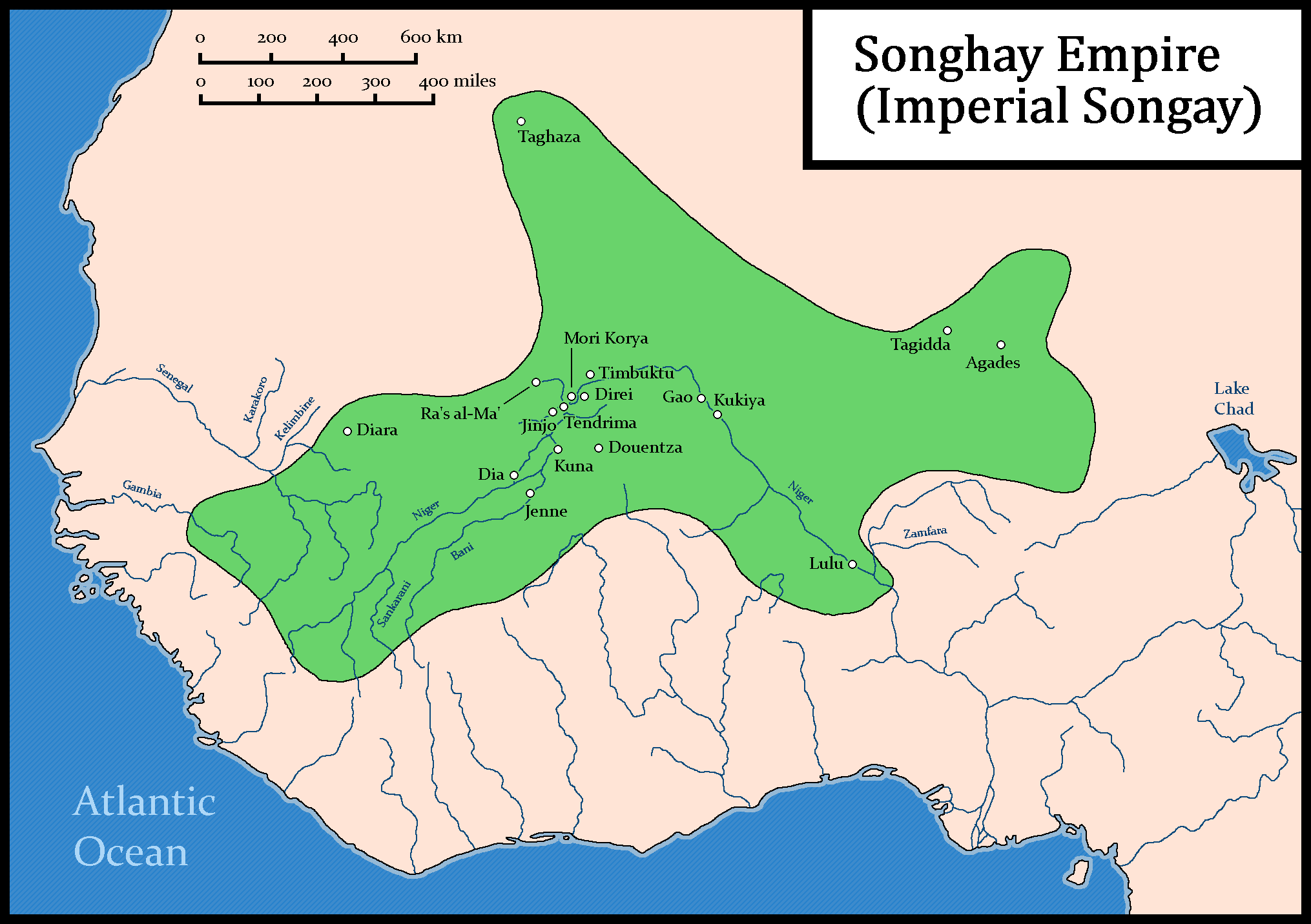
Extent of the Songhai Empire.

Askia Muhammad Ture I (1443–1538), born Muhammad ibn Abi Bakr al-Turi (Note: Or, it is said, al-Sillanki) or Muhammad Ture, was the first ruler of the Askia dynasty of the Songhai Empire, reigning from 1493 to 1528. He is also known as Askia the Great, and his name in modern Songhai is Mamar Kassey. Askia Muhammad strengthened his empire and made it the largest empire in West Africa's history. At its peak under his reign, the Songhai Empire encompassed the Hausa states as far as Kano (in present-day Northern Nigeria) and much of the territory that had belonged to the Songhai empire in the east. His policies resulted in a rapid expansion of trade with Europe and Asia, the creation of many schools, and the establishment of Islam as an integral part of the empire.

Muhammad was a prominent general under the Songhai ruler Sunni Ali. When Sunni Ali was succeeded by his son, Sunni Baru, in 1492, Muhammad challenged the succession on the grounds that the new ruler was not a faithful Muslim. He defeated Baru and ascended to the throne in 1493.

Ture subsequently orchestrated a program of expansion and consolidation which extended the empire from Taghaza in the North to the borders of Yatenga in the South; and from Air in the Northeast to Futa Djallon in Guinea. Instead of organizing the empire along Islamic lines, he tempered and improved on the traditional model by instituting a system of bureaucratic government unparalleled in Western Africa. In addition, Askia established standardized trade measures and regulations, initiated the policing of trade routes and also established an organized tax system. He was overthrown by his son, Askia Musa, in 1528.

== Name and origins ==
The Tarikh al-Sudan gives Askia Muhammad's name as Muhammad ibn Abi Bakr al-Turi or al-Sillanki. The Tarikh al-Fattash gives his name as Abu Abdallah Muhammad ibn Abi Bakr. Al-Turi and al-Sillanki have been interpreted as the Soninke clan names Ture and Sila by many historians. However, Stephan Bühnen has argued that they should be interpreted as nisbas referring to ancestry from Futa Toro or Silla in the Senegal valley, and favors the possibility that his ancestors originally came from Futa Toro.

After going on the hajj in 1497–1498, he also became known as Askia al-Hajj Muhammad. In modern Songhai, he is known as Mamar Kassey. Mamar is a form of the name Muhammad, and Kassey is a matronymic.

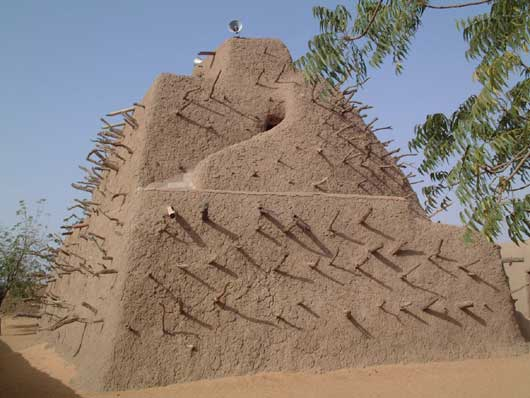
The Tomb of Askia in Mali, claimed to be Askia Muhammad's tomb.

The theory that Askia Muhammad's family originated in Futa Toro is controversial and has been generally rejected by the Songhai people themselves, especially by Muhammad's modern descendants who see in it a challenge to their ethnicity. His exact surname has not been definitively determined and no Toucouleur or Soninke oral source claim him as one of their own. The Tarikh al-Fattash uses the title 'maiga' for him, which is only used for the patrilineal kin of the Sunni dynasty.

The term 'sonhinkey,' which suggests a Soninke ethnic origin for Askia, is also the name of a clan of Songhai magicians responsible for the pre-Islamic cult and forming a younger branch of the royal Sunni clan without rights to the throne. Songhai oral traditions claim the father of Askia Mohammed originated from this clan. Omar Komajago, Askia's brother, is never described as a Touré or a Sylla.

The term at-Turi, which designates the geographical origin of a person, could be the name of Askia's father's village. There is a Songhai village call Tureh in Niger in the Tillabéri Region in the Tera Department.

Although Askia Mohamed is generally seen as the son of princess Kassey, sister of Sunni Ali Ber, it is impossible that he himself came from Fouta Toro because the post of general was only given to a member of the royal family and ethnic Songhai patrilineally. The theory that he is an ethnic Songhai through both his father and mother is being studied at the Ahmed Baba center in Timbuktu.

== Title ==
The title Askia (Note: Or Askiya) (Arabic: اسكيا) is of unknown origin, but had been in use since the early 13th century, if not earlier. It may derive from an arabic word for 'general.' The Tarikh al-Sudan provides a folk etymology for the title, claiming that Askia Muhammad invented the title himself based on the lament of Sonni Ali's daughters when they had learned he had seized power: "a si Kiya", meaning "it is not his" or "he shall not be it".

The original pronunciation of the title is not known; in modern Songhai, it is pronounced siciya. Moroccan sources spelled the title Sukyā or Sikyā, Leo Africanus spelled it Ischia, and a contemporary Portuguese source spelled it Azquya.

== Early life ==
It is not known where Askia Muhammad was born. His father, Baru Lum, (Note: Baru is a Songhai form of the name Abu Bakr. Lum is a clan name, probably of Fula origin.) was of Toucouleur or Soninke ancestry, with ancestors hailing from the Senegal River valley. (Note: The Tarikh al-Fattash says that Askia Muhammad was a descendent of the Torodo. Torodo is Fula for "people of Toro" and refers to the Toucouleur. The clan name Lum is more likely to be of Toucouleur than Soninke origin. The names al-Turi and al-Sillanki have been interpreted as the Soninke clan names Ture and Sila, but they may be references to his father or father's ancestors coming from either Futa Toro or Silla in the Senegal valley. Futa Toro was predominantly Toucouleur and Silla was predominantly Soninke.) His mother was named Kassey (Note: Spelling variants: Kasay, Kassaye, Kassaï, Kassey, Kassai, and Kasse) and is said in oral tradition to have been the sister of Sonni Ali.

== Rebellion ==
Under Sonni Ali, Muhammad Ture was a powerful general but frequently clashed with the king. The Tarikh al-Fattash paints him as a faithful Muslim opposed to Ali's harsh treatment of the ulama of Timbuktu.

In 1492, shortly after the death of Sonni Ali, Muhammad Ture, then a general, rose up against Ali's son Sonni Baru, claiming he was not a faithful Muslim. He drew his support from the ulama of Timbuktu, harshly persecuted under Ali, and Mansa Kura, the Muslim chief of Bara. Sonni Baru drew his from the traditional religious leaders of the Songhay and the Dendi fara, commander of an eastern province. Ture defeated Baru at the Battle of Anfao in April 1493 outside of Gao and took power and the title 'Askia'.

== Reign ==
In 1496 he made the hajj to Mecca, accompanied by 500 horsemen and 1000 infantry. Although he made many charitable donations during his pilgrimage, including setting up a place for West Africa pilgrims to stay in Medina, he returned to Gao having accumulated 50,000 ducats in debt. Despite being away for nearly two years, his return buttressed his position with the prestige of the titles of al-hajj and khalifa, and Islam became a pillar of his rule.

Upon his return, he embarked on a series of campaigns against the Mossi, the Sultanate of Agadez, and the Kanem-Borno empire. In 1501 he defeated the son of the Mansa Mahmud III, Qama-fiti-Kalli, and sacked and captured Diafunu. In 1504 an invasion of Borgu ended in disaster. An expedition to Walata captured the town, but was unable to hold it against Tuareg pressure, and Askia Muhammad accepted tribute in exchange for his abandoning the town. This alliance with the Tuareg was a key pillar of Songhai power, particularly in their control over the salt mines of Taghaza.

In 1512, his brother Omar Komajago led an army that destroyed Futa Kingi, killed Tenguella, and brought the Kingdom of Diarra under the empire's sway. 1515 saw another campaign against Agadez, reinforcing the Songhai position there. This was the peak of his power. Askia Muhammad had earlier conquered Katsina, Zaria and Gobir, devastating the cities with slave-taking and heavy taxation. The expedition against Agadez caused dissension when the Emir of Kebbi felt he had been cheated of his share of the spoils and rebelled, ending Songhai hegemony in Hausaland.

=== Reforms ===
Askia Muhammad profoundly reorganized the Songhai empire. Where Sonni Ali had been a diffident Muslim, Askia was devout. He based the legal system on sharia law, invited Islamic scholars from North Africa, and established Islam as the official religion of the noble class. Toby Green notes as he had "come to power with the support of the Muslim segment of Songhai, an important aspect of his rule was his improved treatment of the Ulemas in comparison to the reign of Sonni Ali". The scholars did not forget his work, and Al-Sa’dī described how he “befriended the scholars and sought counsel from them over the appointments and dismissals he made".

Askia Muhammad also divided the empire into provinces with centrally appointed governors and created a series of ministries (including finance, justice, interior, protocol, agriculture, waters and forests, and matters pertaining to “tribes of the white race” e.g. Tuaregs and Berbers), with all important positions filled by relatives. Although Gao remained the capital, Timbuktu became a kind of second capital.

Askia Muhammad created a professionalized army, rather than the general levy that his predecessors had commanded. These soldiers, legally slaves of the Askia, could be sent on long expeditions away from the Niger river.

== Exile and death ==
Askia Muhammad had many sons, who jockeyed for position and influence at court. When a younger one, Bala, was appointed to a prestigious governorship, Musa threatened to have the king's powerful advisor 'Ali Folon killed and drove him to exile in Tindirma in 1526. He had been concealing the fact that Muhammad, well over 70 years old, had gone blind. Ill and increasingly politically isolated, Askia Muhammad was forced to abdicate by his son Askia Musa in August 1528. Musa reigned only 3 years before being killed by his brothers. His successor, the son of Omar Kondjago and Muhammad's nephew, exiled the old king to an island in the Niger. From here, he plotted with his son Ismail to retake the throne. This was accomplished in April 1537, and Muhammad returned to Gao where he ceremonially conferred on Ismail the title and regalia of Caliph. He died and was buried in Gao in 1538.

== Descent from Askia ==
The Tarikh al fattash reports the many descendants of Askia Muhammad, who is said to have had 471 children from many wives and concubines of various origins. Just like Genghis Khan in Asia and Charlemagne in Europe, Emperor Askia Muhammad and the emperors descended from his brother Omar Komdjago constitute patrilineal or matrilineal ancestors of a significant part of the native Sahelian populations and descendants of Sahelians who extend over 6 country where the Songhai are present, their descendants are mainly linked to powerful old royal house where always according to the sahel.

=== Mamar Haamey ===
Mamar is the nickname of Askia Muhammad and these many descendants are called mamar hamey, they are the descendants of Askia Ishaq II, Askia Nuh, Askia Mohammed V Gao who were dethroned by Moroccans after the Battle of Tondibi and the successive wars, to those add the descendants of the many ministers, governors, generals who constitute the children and grandchildren of the askia, in Mali they are scattered among their subjects and occupy the positions of village chief, and were under for some under the authority of the Moroccan arma chiefs (Gao Alkaydo of Gao, the Pasha of Timbuktu) before French colonization, only Djenne royal house, Hombori royal house and Kikara royal house have Askyanid ruler in Mali. In western Niger where the great princes migrated with all the strong lineage they founded powerful Emirates such as Dargol, Tera, Gothèye, Karma, Namaro, Sikié, Kokorou, larba Birno, Gounday next to the sunni emirs of Gorouol, Anzourou, they are constantly at war with each other and against the Tuareg ouelleminden and oudalan and the Fulani of Dori, those who mi gre further south reigns in Gaya, Bana, Tanda, Yelou, Bengou, loulami, karimama, Banikoara up to Djougou where they are in the majority and have formed the dendi where they are mixed and reign over the Bariba, Yoruba, Gur, Mandé, Yom, their arrival at the Dendi (province) triggers the assimilation of non-Songhai populations to the Songhai culture and language and an Islamization of the bargou, they are in Niger integrated with the Za and Sunni with the ethnic name Zarma, the most notable are the Emir Oumarou karma who fought against French colonization, Gabelinga Hama Kassa the military leader of goundey allied with wangugnya issa korombeyze moodi the mother of the war of zarmatarey during the wars against the caliphate of sokoto, they joined Babatu in Gurunsi and Dagbon to conquer the Upper Volta and the Northern Territories of the Gold Coast. The three members of the three dynasties on arrival Colonial was associated with the non-royal clans, their attached religious clans and their freedmen to form 1/4 of the Songhai population, 3/4 being made up of the servile mass that they had at their service. The Mamar haamey considering themselves uncles of the Djermas never enter into conflict with them and join forces with them to beat the sokoto, the Toucouleur, the Fulani of Dori and boboye and the Tuaregs. In Burkina they are overwhelmed by the Fulani and Tuareg masses and many were ethnically assimilated by the Fulani, they are in Darkoye, Markoye and Gorom Gorom with the Sunni.

The descendants of the askia like that of sunni carry the title of Maiga associated with imperial power.

=== Songhai Djermas ===
The descendants of the Askia are also to be found mainly among the Songhai subgroup of the Djermas descending from the previous Za Dynasty of the Sunni Dynasty and Askia Dynasty and who ruled over the Gao Empire, the marriages between the members descending from the three powerful songhai dynasty was frequent and the princesses of blood and noble milk were only exchanged between these three dynasty, thus khaman Duksa, Zarmakoy sambo (Mali Bero) and Tagour Gana of the 17th and 18th century descendants of the za all took wives from the descendants of the askia living with them in the dendi, the askia reigning in the dendi on the right bank of the river and the royal Za lineage of the waazi, sega, fahmey, kogori, kandi, Manay, Zem on the left bank, they bear the royal title of Djermakoy which does not It is to bear that to the descendant of the za, he reigns in the zarmaganda (Tondikiwindi, Ouallam, Simiri ) over the kalley and in the zarmatarey (Dosso, kiota, yeni, Fakara, kouré, Kollo, libore, N'Dounga, kirtachi, babousaye, Tondikandia, bogole, Hamdallaye, Garankedey, Fabidji ) over the Gooley. The Maouri ( Royale house of Mawrikoy of sokorbe and Mawrikoy of Moussadey), Gubey (Royale house of goubekoy of Loga) assimilated and having constituted royal houses married to the za.

Matrimonial relations between the askia and the za are the basis of cousinhood between the Songhai djermas and the Songhai Mamar Hamey. The Mamar Haamey consider themselves the maternal uncles of the Zarma, the same relationship is observed with the descendants of the Sunni Ali Ber .

The descendants of the Za Dynasty have always occupied high positions in the empire in the Army and the administration, especially in the military province of dendi, where they held the position of Dendi Fari and their role was decisive in stopping the advance Moroccan in the dendi with generals of values like Hawa ize maali and yefarma ishak of the house of Manay. the Mamar Hamay occupy two djerma kingdoms by imposition during the French colonization in Niger, the French massacre to the last the royal house of the Zarmakoy of Ouallam and bring in a Mamar Haama from Hombori to occupy the vacant throne, same case in the Fakara where a mamar haama is imported from Yonkoto to occupy the throne, all within the framework of the armed revolt of mamar haama oumarou emir of karma against the Colonial administration, the saying between songhai we are only one family that will chew each other but never swallow each other is used so that the populations of these two principalities accept the taxes. the Songhai do not have a problem when an ethnic Songhai comes to usurp a throne from them but this revolts in the case of a non-Songhai and leaves the country when they cannot prevent the unknown .

The Djerma, the mamar hamey and the si hamey all qualify as zaberbenda (the descendants of za the great, za el ayaman) and must support each other in the event of an enemy attack, when the mamar haama are attacked on the right bank, the Tubal War drum are struck to warn the left bank where the Djerma princes are beating theirs to gather their armies and cross the river to support their brother in the west and vice versa.

=== Hausa land ===
Askia Mohamed I is the maternal ancestor of the Hausa Sultans of the Bagauda Dynasty through his daughter Awah married to Muhammad Rumfa Sultan of Kano during the conquest of the Hausa Kingdoms by the Songhai Empire, they are replaced by the Fulani Sullubawa clan Dabo Dynasty during the conquest of kano by the Sokoto caliphate, having many daughters the askia contracted diplomatic marriages with the kings subject to his power to ensure their loyalty, kano is certainly not the only Hausa state where this kind relationships were established.

All Hausa descendants of Muhammad Rumfa sultan of Kano are matrilineal line descendants of Askia.

=== Others ===
The Arma who come from the marriage between the Spanish soldiers of Morocco and the Songhai women are also in matrilineal line descending from the Askiya for the most part.

Throughout the Central Sahel, the descendants in patrilineal or matrilineal line of the askia can be around Million drawn from the ethnic Songhai which amounts to nearly 11 million people and possible descendants among the Hausa, The Fula and there are generally only than associated with royal houses. The pyramidal Tomb of Askia located in Gao has not been the subject of any excavation to examine his remains in order to carry out genetic examinations and these known descendants have no longer been the subject of study, only a genetic study can confirm the historical connection.

Are sons the Askia Dawud also had Total 333 children according to the Tarikh al-Sudan while the Tarikh al-Fattash has 61 children, 30 of whom died at a young age. the many princes died for the most part young because of the assassinations that occurred during the successions to the imperial throne, especially with the emperors Askia Musa the eldest of the sons of the askia born of his Dahomean concubine who carried out a coup and murdered a good number of these brothers and 25 to 35 of these cousins.

The successions on the imperial Songhai throne are generally preceded by a battle between the princes, the strongest generally takes power, it is this instability which favored the Moroccan invasion and the defeat of Tondibi due to a weak contribution of troops resulting from the cold between the emperor Ishaq II and the balama of the kurmina.

== Legacy ==
Askia encouraged learning and literacy, ensuring that Songhai's universities produced the most distinguished scholars, many of whom published significant books and one of which was his nephew and friend Mahmud Kati. To secure the legitimacy of his usurpation of the Sonni dynasty, Askia Muhammad allied himself with the scholars of Timbuktu, ushering in a golden age in the city for scientific and Muslim scholarship. The eminent scholar Ahmed Baba, for example, produced books on Islamic law which are still in use today. Muhammad Kati published Tarikh al-fattash and Abdul-Rahman as-Sadi published Tarikh al-Sudan (Chronicle of The Black Land), two history books which are indispensable to present-day scholars reconstructing African history in the Middle Ages. The king's supposed tomb, the Tomb of Askia, is now a UNESCO World Heritage Site.

Since the 17th century, griots (or jeseré) have been narrating an oral epic known as The Epic of Askia Mohammed. A version recounted by Nouhou Malio was recorded by Thomas A. Hale in Niger on December 30, 1980 and January 26, 1981. A bilingual transcription of this performance was published in 1990 in Scribe, Griot, and Novelist: Narrative Interpreters of the Songhay Empire, followed by The Epic of Askia Mohammed Recounted by Nouhou Malio.

=== In popular culture ===
- The Nigerien musical group Mamar Kassey is named after Askia Muhammad.
- In the turn-based strategy game Sid Meier's Civilization V, Askia Muhammad is depicted as the leader of the Songhai civilization, one of the playable factions, as a great, aggressive leader.
