= Songhaiborai =

Songhai subgroup

Songhai
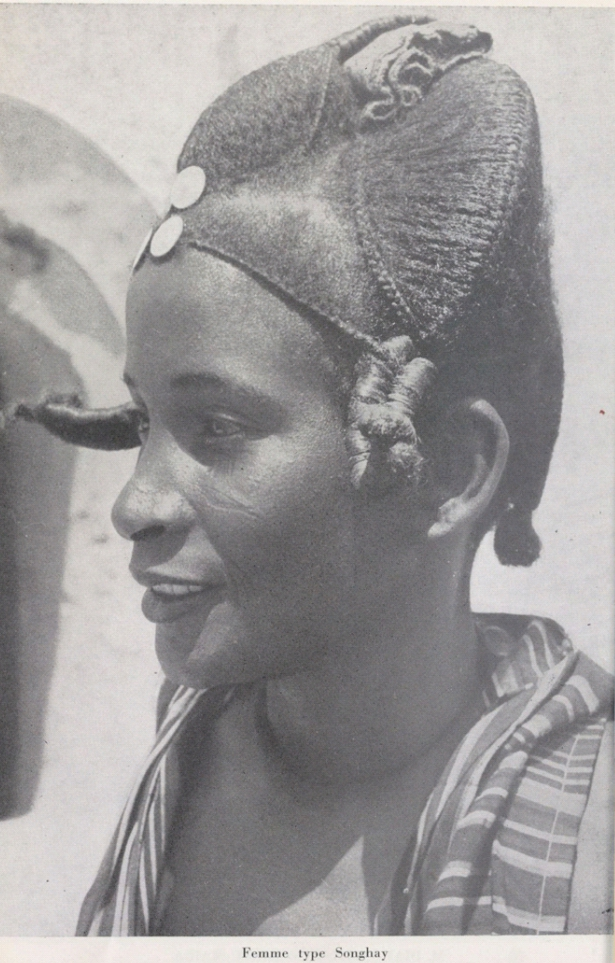
- Songhay woman, Niger (1900s)

Languages
- Songhoyboro Ciine, Koyraboro Senni, Humburi Senni, Tondi Songway Kiini, Koyra Chiini

Religion
- Islam

Related ethnic groups
- Zarma, Tuareg

- Person: Songhaiboro
- People: Songhaiborai
- Language: Songhai Sanni

The Songhaiborai (also Songhai, Songhay, Sonrhaï) are a distinct subgroup within the larger Songhai ethnolinguistic family, residing predominantly in Niger's Songhai region and Northern Mali, with a minority presence in Burkina Faso. Notably, they trace their lineage to the ruling dynasties of the ancient Songhai Empire.

In Niger and Burkina Faso, differentiating the Songhaiborai from the Zarma people poses a challenge, as both are subgroups within the same language family, sharing a very similar dialect and culture. Despite the significant commonalities, the Songhaiborai may identify themselves and their dialect as "Zarma," emphasizing the shared heritage. However, both groups acknowledge their distinct branches within the same ethnicity, often adopting the collective name "Zarma," making it difficult for outsiders to discern any noticeable differences. Additionally, in Mali, they are recognized as the Koyraboro.

The Songhai originally were the descendants and partisans of the Sonni dynasty that retreated to this area of present Niger after the coup d'état of 1493 and that of the Askia dynasty that also moved later to this same region after the invasion of the Songhai Empire by the Saadi dynasty of Morocco in 1591. These two historical events that resulted in the mass exodus of the Songhai emptied Gao and Timbuktu of their Songhai nobles, who find themselves dispersed today in the above-mentioned region of Southwestern Niger.

== Aristocracy ==
According to oral history, the Songhai nobles came to be known as "Songhai" during the reign of Sonni Ali Ber. The name was coined from his name to form a tribal name for the ruling caste.

The main factions of the Songhai are the "Si Hamey" and the "Mamar Hamey". The Si Hamey (meaning: descendants of Sonni), as the name implies, are the descendants and partisans of the Sonnis, while the "Mamar Hamey" are the descendants and partisans of Askia Mohammad I whose vernacular name among the Songhai is "Mamar". It is also worth noting that both groups use the title surname "Maiga" (meaning, "King or Prince").

== History ==
After the ruler and founder of the Songhai Empire Sonni Ali died in 1492, his former army general and nephew Askia Mohammad rebelled against his son and successor, Sonni Baru and defeated him in a battle in 1493 . Sonni Baru fled to Ayorou and established his own small kingdom.

After the defeat of the Songhai Empire at the battle of Tondibi in 1591, the son of Askia Dawud, Askia Muhammed Gao (aka Wayki), deposed his brother Askia Ishaq II and briefly took command of the Songhai resistance army. Supported by the remains of the disbanded army, they migrated down river from Gao to the same region of Ayorou where Sonni Baru and his people had taken refuge after their overthrow, precisely in present-day Niger's Tillabery Region.

Askia Wayki (Muhammed Gao) installed his base on the banks of the Niger river in the current locality of Sikié hoping in vain for a possible passage of the Moroccan army. Askia Muhammed Gao died in 1632 without being able to regroup his men to reclaim Gao, which had fallen under the control of Judar Pasha. His son, Fari Monzon (Fari Mondyo) who was an Inspector of tax collection during the reign of Askia Ishaq I succeeded him and in 1661 tried for the second time to regroup the Songhai including their rival cousins (the Si Hamey and the Zarma) in order to take back the city of Gao. Together, they were able to garner the support of the Tuaregs from Imanan and Azawad.

Recognizing the strength of the Moroccan army, they later decided to abandon the struggle for the re-establishment of the Songhai Empire. The son of Fari Monzon, Tabari took command of Karma, a principality established since the passage of Askia Mohammad I during his pilgrimage to Mecca. His other brothers and cousins created the kingdoms of Namaro, Gothèye, Dargol, Téra, Sikié, Kokorou etc. This marked the end of an empire that once shone for its immensity and the courage of its leaders in spite of multiple incessant internal conflicts of succession. These kingdoms, however, did not find their union circumstantial until March 1906, during the anti-colonial battle of Karma-Boubon led by Oumarou Kambessikonou (Morou Karma), a descendant of Askia Daoud and brother to Askia Muhammed Gao.

== Society and culture ==
The language, society and culture of the Songhai people is barely distinguishable from the Zarma people. Some scholars consider the Zarma people to be a part of and the largest ethnic sub-group of the Ayneha. Some study the group together as Zarma-Songhai people. However, both groups see themselves as two different peoples.

The Songhai proper have traditionally been a socially stratified society, like many West African ethnic groups with castes. According to the medieval and colonial era descriptions, their vocation is hereditary, and each stratified group has been endogamous. The social stratification has been unusual in two ways; it embedded slavery, wherein the lowest strata of the population inherited slavery, and the Zima, or priests and Islamic clerics, had to be initiated but did not automatically inherit that profession, making the cleric strata a pseudo-caste.

Louis Dumont, the 20th-century author famous for his classic Homo Hierarchicus, recognized the social stratification among Zarma-Songhai people as well as other ethnic groups in West Africa, but suggested that sociologists should invent a new term for West African social stratification system. Other scholars consider this a bias and isolationist because the West African system shares all elements in Dumont's system, including economic, endogamous, ritual, religious, deemed polluting, segregative and spread over a large region. According to Anne Haour – a professor of African Studies, some scholars consider the historic caste-like social stratification in Zarma-Songhay people to be a pre-Islam feature while some consider it derived from the Arab influence.

The different strata of the Songhai have included the kings and warriors, the scribes, the artisans, the weavers, the hunters, the fishermen, the leather workers and hairdressers (Wanzam), and the domestic slaves (Horso, Bannye). Each caste reveres its own guardian spirit. Some scholars such as John Shoup list these strata in three categories: free (chiefs, farmers and herders), servile (artists, musicians and griots), and the slave class. The servile group were socially required to be endogamous, while the slaves could be emancipated over four generations. The highest social level, states Shoup, claim to have descended from King Sonni 'Ali Ber and their modern era hereditary occupation has been Sohance (sorcery). The traditionally free strata of the Songhai proper and Zarma have owned property and herds, and these have dominated the political system and governments during and after the French colonial rule. Within the stratified social system, the Islamic system of polygynous marriages is a norm, with preferred partners being cross cousins. This endogamy within Songhai-Zarma people is similar to other ethnic groups in West Africa.

=== Livelihood ===
The Songhay are mostly agriculturalists (mostly growing rice and millet), hunters, fishers and cattle owners which they let the Fulani tend.

== See also ==
- Zarma people
- Askia Muhammad Gao
- The Songhai
