= Sohance =

The Sohance (also known as the Sohankye or Si Hamey) are a social caste among the Songhai nobility. They are believed to be the direct descendants of the Sonni Dynasty and its last ruler, Sonni Ali Ber, the founder of the Songhai Empire, who reigned from 1464 to 1492.

== History and Culture ==
The Sohance are known to be the priestly class and guardians of ancient Songhai culture. They are mainly concentrated in the western part of what is now Niger, where they settled after their ruling dynasty was ousted from power by Askia Muhammed. The area that they settled is still known as the Songhai country.

== Importance in Songhai ==
The Sohance were considered to be the highest caste among the Songhai, and even Askia Muhammed was said to be from the Sohance caste, contrary to what other historians have suggested linking him to the Sillanké caste of the Soninke people. According to accounts, the Sohance were massively opposed to Askia Mohammed's ascent to the throne as he was not the legitimate heir.

Further research by the Ahmed Baba Institute of Higher Learning and Islamic Research in Timbuktu has shown that what was previously thought to be Sillankè was actually a mistranslation of the word “Sohance” found in the Tarikh al-fattash book, which gives accounts of the Songhai Empire.

According to the French anthropologist and filmmaker, Jean Rouch, who carried out fieldwork and documented the Songhai populations of Niger in the 1940s and 1950s, the Sohance are the true Songhai due to the minimal foreign cultural influences found among them, as opposed to other regions where outside influences were more prevalent. Rouch noted that "the true Songhay, after the seventeenth century, is no longer the one of Timbuktu or Gao, but the one farther south near the Anzourou, the Gorouol, on the islands of the river surrounded by rapids."
