= Niger–Nigeria border =

International border

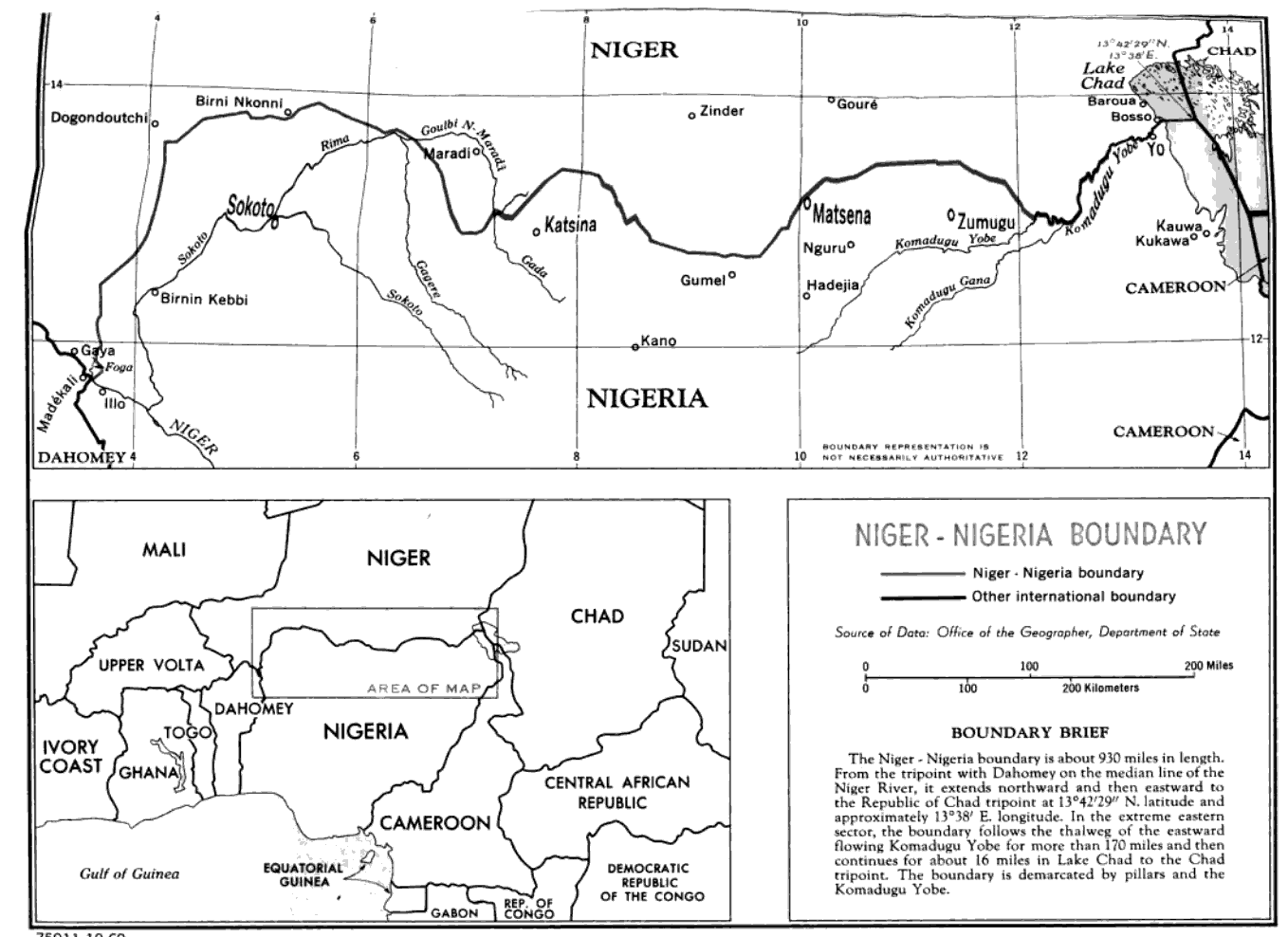
Niger-Nigeria border

The Niger–Nigeria border is 1,608 kilometres (999 miles) in length and runs from the tripoint with Benin in the west to the tripoint with Chad in the east.

== Description ==
The border starts in the west at Beninese tripoint in the Niger River, then proceeds overland in a northwards direction, before turning eastwards in a broad arc. The border then proceeds eastwards in a broadly eastwards direction, though with considerable undulation, before reaching the Komadougou Yobe River; the boundary then follows this river eastwards to the tripoint with Chad in Lake Chad. The border cuts through the densely populated cultural region known as Hausaland, with Hausa speakers forming the majority on both sides of the frontier.

== History ==
The border first emerged during the Scramble for Africa, a period of intense competition between European powers in the later 19th century for territory and influence in Africa. The process culminated in the Berlin Conference of 1884, in which the European nations concerned agreed upon their respective territorial claims and the rules of engagements going forward. As a result of this France gained control of the upper valley of the Niger River (roughly equivalent to the areas of modern Mali and Niger). Meanwhile, Britain, which had (via the Royal Niger Company) administered the area around Lagos since 1861 and the Oil River Protectorate (Calabar are the surrounding area) since 1884, would have priority in the areas south of the upper Niger region. From their respective bases both nations gradually extended their rule into the interior. France has conquered the area of modern Niger in 1900; initially ruled as a military territory, it was later included within the federal colony of French West Africa (Afrique occidentale française, abbreviated AOF). The British likewise extended their rule inland from their Lagos and Calabar bases, forming two additional colonies - the Southern Nigeria Protectorate and the Northern Nigeria Protectorate. In 1900 rule of these areas was transferred to the British government, with the Northern and Southern (including Lagos and Calabar) protectorates united as the colony of Nigeria in 1914. Britain and France had signed a treaty on 5 August 1890, agreeing that their respective territories would be divided by a line from Say to Baroua near Lake Chad; this line was in general further north than the current border. This boundary line was further delimited in 1898, 1904 and 1906, being finalised at its current location in 1910. A series of beacons and markers were thereafter placed on the ground to physically demarcate the border.

After the Second World War both Britain and France committed to the decolonisation of their African territories. As a result, Niger was granted independence in August 1960, followed by Nigeria in October 1960, at which point their mutual frontier became an international one between two sovereign states.

In recent years the border area has been heavily affected by the ongoing Boko Haram insurgency in north-east Nigeria, resulting in flows of cross-border refugees and a general state of lawlessness.

== Settlements near the border ==
=== Niger ===
- Sabon Birni
- Bana
- Yelou
- Guéza
- Bei Bei
- Doumega
- Nassaraoua
- Tibiri
- Gofo
- Bazaga
- Birni-N'Konni
- Tsernaoua
- Doguerawa
- Kabobi
- Bangui
- Dan Mairi
- Serkin Toudou
- Maraka
- Bakoraouni
- Magaria
- Doumbari
- Gamdou
- Dunari
- Miskindi
- Toulatoula
- Faya Koura
- Mainé-Soroa
- Diffa
- Bosso

=== Nigeria ===
- Dolé
- Kamba
- Kokoba
- Maiyama
- Rafin Tsaka
- Nageda
- Kangiwa
- Kwalaye
- Lema
- Tagimba
- Jimojime Sule
- Tunugara
- Ruawuri
- Kalmalo
- Kwashebawa
- Djibia
- Katsina
- Dankama
- Mai'Adua
- Zango
- Rogogo
- Maribara
- Baure
- Babura
- Maigatari
- Galadi
- Machina
- Gumsi
- Meori
- Kurusalia
- Njikilamma
- Karagu
- Margawa
- Arege

== Border crossings ==
There are numerous official border crossings, the main ones being Gaya-Kamba, Birni-N'Konni-Ilela, Dan-Issa-Katsina and Magaria-Mutum.

== See also ==
- Niger-Nigeria relations
