= 1493 =

1493 in various calendars
- Gregorian calendar: 1493; MCDXCIII
- Ab urbe condita: 2246
- Armenian calendar: 942; ԹՎ ՋԽԲ
- Assyrian calendar: 6243
- Balinese saka calendar: 1414–1415
- Bengali calendar: 899–900
- Berber calendar: 2443
- English Regnal year: 8 Hen. 7 – 9 Hen. 7
- Buddhist calendar: 2037
- Burmese calendar: 855
- Byzantine calendar: 7001–7002
- Chinese calendar: 壬子年 (Water Rat); 4190 or 3983 — to — 癸丑年 (Water Ox); 4191 or 3984
- Coptic calendar: 1209–1210
- Discordian calendar: 2659
- Ethiopian calendar: 1485–1486
- Hebrew calendar: 5253–5254
- Hindu calendars
- Vikram Samvat: 1549–1550
- Shaka Samvat: 1414–1415
- Kali Yuga: 4593–4594
- Holocene calendar: 11493
- Igbo calendar: 493–494
- Iranian calendar: 871–872
- Islamic calendar: 898–899
- Japanese calendar: Meiō 2 (明応２年)
- Javanese calendar: 1410–1411
- Julian calendar: 1493; MCDXCIII
- Korean calendar: 3826
- Minguo calendar: 419 before ROC 民前419年
- Nanakshahi calendar: 25
- Thai solar calendar: 2035–2036
- Tibetan calendar: ཆུ་ཕོ་བྱི་བ་ལོ་ (male Water-Rat); 1619 or 1238 or 466 — to — ཆུ་མོ་གླང་ལོ་ (female Water-Ox); 1620 or 1239 or 467

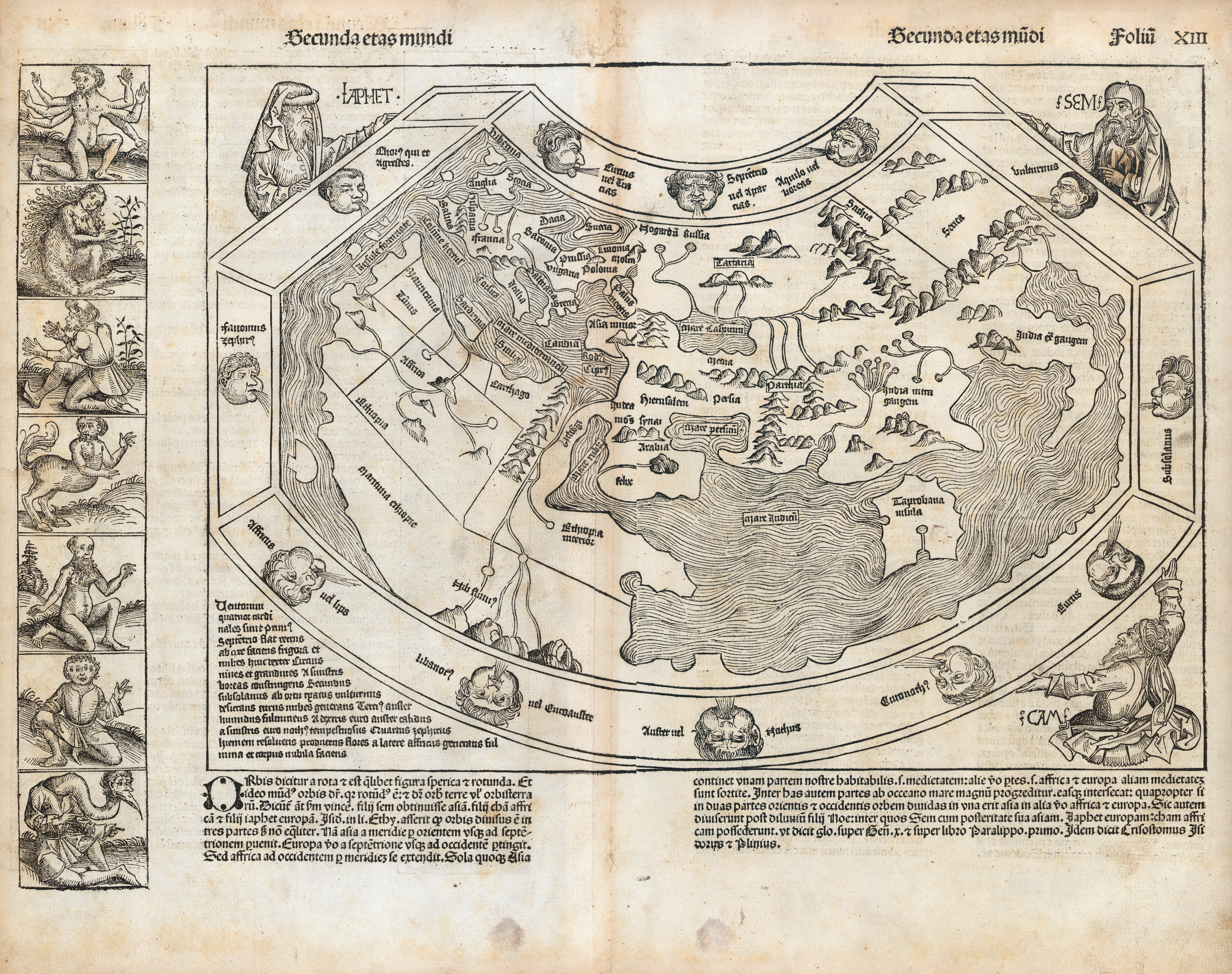
Hartmann Schedel's 1493 map of the world

Year 1493 (MCDXCIII) was a common year starting on Tuesday of the Julian calendar.

== Events ==
=== January–March ===
- January 15 – Christopher Columbus and his crew begin their voyage back to Europe on their two remaining ships, the caravel La Niña (guided by Columbus) and the Pinta (piloted by Martín Alonso Pinzón), departing from the island of Hispanola and what becomes known as the Bay of Rincón in the Dominican Republic. The decision to return to Spain comes two days after the crew's battle with the indigenous residents, the Ciguayos.
- January 19 – In the Treaty of Barcelona, King Charles VIII of France returns Cerdagne and Roussillon to King Ferdinand of Aragon.
- February 14 – A storm east of the Azores threatens to capsize both of the remaining ships, the Niña and the Pinta, on the expedition of Christopher Columbus as the crew are returning to Europe after being the first to reach the "New World". The two ships are separated and neither crew knows the fate of the other. The crew takes a vow for one of them to make a pilgrimage if they survive the storm. Columbus himself later makes a pilgrimage to the cathedral at Moguer in Andalusia in Spain.
- February 15 – Columbus begins writing his first account of his voyage to the New World, titled "Letter of Columbus, on the islands of India beyond the Ganges recently discovered", an account later printed and sold throughout Europe. His reference to the Ganges river in India confirms that he thought he had reached Asia.
- March 1 – Martín Alonso Pinzón returns in the Pinta to the city of Bayona in Spain from Christopher Columbus's voyage of discovery, sending the first notice about the discovery to the Catholic Monarchs. Columbus himself is delayed by a storm in the Azores.
- March 4 – Christopher Columbus anchors in Lisbon and completes his February 15 letter on the first voyage, conveying the news of his discoveries.
- March 15 – Christopher Columbus and Martín Alonso Pinzón return to Palos de la Frontera, the original port in Spain from where they started the first voyage of discovery.
- March 30 – In light of his success, Christopher Columbus is granted the title of "Admiral of the Ocean Sea" ("Almirante del mar Océano") and "Viceroy and Governor of the islands which he has discovered in the Indies".

=== April–June ===
- April 12 – Battle of Anfao: Askia Mohammad I defeats Sonni Baru in what becomes the African nation of Mali, and usurps the throne of the Songhai Empire.
- May 4 – In the papal bull Inter caetera, Pope Alexander VI decrees that all lands discovered 100 leagues (or further west) of the Azores are Spanish.
- May 23 – The Treaty of Senlis is signed in France at the city of Senlis (in the modern Oise département) between King Charles VIII of France and Maximilian I, King of the Romans, ending the War of the Burgundian Succession between France and the Holy Roman Empire and dividing the Burgundian lands.
- June 8 – In the most well-documented surgical procedures in the 15th century, the left leg of the Holy Roman Emperor Frederick III is amputated. The surgery is performed at the Linz castle under the direction of the surgeon Hans Seyff.
- June 25 – Friar Bernardo Buil, a Catalan monk in Spain, is appointed by Pope Alexander VI as the first Christian "Vicar Apostolic of the New World". Friar Buil will depart from Cadiz on September 25 on the second voyage of Christopher Columbus, and will begin his mission at La Isabela, a Spanish settlement on the island of Hispanola in what becomes the Dominican Republic.

=== July–September ===
- July 12 – The Nuremberg Chronicle, written in Latin by Hartmann Schedel as Liber Chronicarum and described as "a history of the world from the Creation to the year 1493", with woodcut illustrations by Michael Wohlgemut and Wilhelm Pleydenwurff, is first printed. The expense is undertaken by two German merchants in Nuremberg, Sebald Schreyer and Sebastian Kammermeister.
- July – In India, at Srinagar, Muhammad Shah Mir resumes his rule as the Sultan of Kashmir, replacing Fateh Shah Miri, who had ruled since 1486.
- August 19 – Maximilian I succeeds his father, Frederick III, as Holy Roman Emperor.
- September 9 – At the Battle of Krbava Field in southern Croatia, forces of the Ottoman Empire defeat those of the Kingdom of Croatia.
- September 24 – Christopher Columbus leaves Cádiz on his second voyage of exploration.
- September 26 – Pope Alexander VI issues the bull Dudum siquidem to the Catholic Monarchs, extending the grant of newly discovered lands he made them in Inter caetera.

=== October–December ===
- October 24 – Spain's Royal Council issues a Provision setting harsh sanctions against Spanish Christians who slander people who have newly converted from Judaism to Christianity, particularly with the term tornadizos.
- November 19 – Christopher Columbus lands on the coast of the island of Borinquen, which he renames San Juan (modern-day Puerto Rico).
- December 8 – The first Roman Catholic Mass in the New World is celebrated, with Friar Juan Pérez of the Order of Friars Minor conducting the services at Point Concepcion on the island of Hispaniola.

=== Date unknown ===
- England imposes sanctions on Burgundy for supporting Perkin Warbeck, the pretender to the English throne.
- James IV of Scotland seizes lands of John of Islay, Earl of Ross, putting an end to the Lord of the Isles.
- Huayna Capac becomes emperor of the Inca Empire.
- Leonardo da Vinci creates the first known design for a helicopter.

== Births ==
- January 2 – Louis de Bourbon de Vendôme, French cardinal (d. 1557)
- January 6 – Olaus Petri, Swedish clergyman (d. 1552)
- January 9 – Johann of Brandenburg-Ansbach, Viceroy of Valencia, German noble (d. 1525)
- January 25 – Maximilian Sforza, Duke of Milan (d. 1530)
- January 26
  - Min Bin, king of Arakan (d. 1554)
  - Giovanni Poggio, Italian cardinal and diplomat (d. 1556)
  - Ippolita Maria Sforza, Italian noble (d. 1501)
- February 9 – Helen of the Palatinate, Duchess of Pomerania (d. 1524)
- March 15 – Anne de Montmorency, 1st Duke of Montmorency, Constable of France (d. 1567)
- April 11 – George I, Duke of Pomerania from the House of Griffins (d. 1531)
- April 25 – Giovanni Gaddi, Italian priest (d. 1542)
- May 5 – Alessandro Pasqualini, Italian architect (d. 1559)
- May 6 – Girolamo Seripando, Catholic cardinal (d. 1563)
- June 5 – Justus Jonas, German Protestant reformer (d. 1555)
- June 10 – Anton Fugger, German merchant (d. 1560)
- September 28 – Agnolo Firenzuola, Italian poet and litterateur (d. 1543)
- September 29 – Yi Gwang-sik, Korean politician and general (d. 1563)
- October 14 – Shimazu Tadayoshi, Japanese warlord (d. 1568)
- October 17 – Bartolommeo Bandinelli, Renaissance Italian sculptor (d. 1560)
- November 11 – Bernardo Tasso, Italian courtier and poet (d. 1569)
- November 11 or December 17 – Paracelsus, born Philippus von Hohenheim, Swiss physician and scientist (d. 1541)
- November 17 – John Neville, 3rd Baron Latimer, English politician (d. 1543)
- November 25 – Osanna of Cattaro, Dominican visionary and anchoress (d. 1565)
- December 9 – Íñigo López de Mendoza, 4th Duke of the Infantado (d. 1566)
- December 25 – Antoinette of Bourbon, French noblewoman (d. 1583)
- December 27 – Johann Pfeffinger, German theologian (d. 1573)
- December 31 – Eleonora Gonzaga, Duchess of Urbino, Italian politically active duchess (d. 1570)
- date unknown
  - Jobst II, Count of Hoya (d. 1545)
  - Simon Grynaeus, German scholar and theologian (d. 1541)
  - Matsudaira Shigeyoshi, Japanese general (d. 1580)
- probable
  - Jean du Bellay, French cardinal and diplomat (d. 1560)
  - Robert Maxwell, 5th Lord Maxwell, Scottish statesman (d. 1546)

== Deaths ==
- May – Pietro Antonio Solari, Italian architect (b. 1450)
- May 10 – Colin Campbell, 1st Earl of Argyll, Scottish politician (b. c. 1433)
- May 14 – Nannina de' Medici, member of de' Medici family (b. 1448)
- June 14 – Ermolao Barbaro, Italian scholar (b. 1454)
- August 19 – Frederick III, Holy Roman Emperor (b. 1415)
- September 9 – Mirko Derenčin, Croatian leader
- October 11 – Eleanor of Naples, Duchess of Ferrara (b. 1450)
- October 22 – James Douglas, 1st Earl of Morton
- November 6 – Andrey Bolshoy, Russian prince (b. 1446)
- date unknown
  - Ahmad Zarruq, Moroccan scholar and Sufi sheikh (b. 1442)
  - James Blount, English soldier
  - Isabel Bras Williamson, Scottish merchant (b. 1430)
  - Kim Si-sŭp, Korean scholar and author (b. 1435)
  - Martín Alonso Pinzón, Spanish navigator and explorer (b. c. 1441)
  - Tupac Inca Yupanqui, Inca ruler of Tahuantinsuyu
