= Askia Mohammad Benkan =

Muhammad Bonkana
- Askiya of the Songhai Empire
- Reign: April 12, 1531 – 1537
- Predecessor: Askiya Musa
- Successor: Askia Isma'il
- Died: c. 1559; Sama Markala
- Dynasty: Askiya dynasty
- Father: Umar Komajago
- Mother: Mina Kirao

Askia Mohammad Benkan, also Askiya Muhammad Bonkana Kirya, was the third ruler of the Songhai Empire from 1531 to 1537.

Muhammad Bonkana Kirya was the son of Umar Komajago, the powerful Kurmina-fari who ruled the western provinces of Songhai from Tindirma under his brother Askia Mohammad I. Later legends claim that he was born by c-section, and that Sunni Ali himself had prophesied that he would be a plague on his uncle's line. He spent much of his youth studying at the Sankore mosque in Timbuktu.

Mohammad Benkan took part in his cousin Askia Musa's coup against Askia Mohammed, and was appointed to the prestigious title of Kurmina-fari, which his father had held before him. He later joined some of Askia Musa's brothers in plotting the emperor's assassination in the village of Mansura on Wed 12 April 1531. When the leader of the putsch, ‘Ali Wāy, returned to Gao to claim the throne they found that Mohammad Benkan had proclaimed himself Askia in their absence. Faced with a fait-accompli, they could do nothing.

To secure his position Benkan banished Askia Mohammad, his paternal uncle, to the island of Kangaga in the River Niger west of Gao. He appointed his brother Uthman ibn Amar as Kurmina-fari. The Tarikh al-Sudan contains this description of his court:

Askiya Muhammad Bonkana furbished the court splendidly, enlarging it, adorning it, and embellishing it with more courtiers than ever before. He supplied sumptuous garments, invented different types of musical instruments (versions of the trumpet-like fotorifo, and deep sounding gabtanda drum), and sponsored many male and female singers. He gave out abundant largesse and benefactions. During his reign divine favours were bestowed, doors were opened, and blessings poured forth.

Benkan tried to reverse his uncle's policy of relying on the towns, preferring instead to gather support from the peasants. His reign also saw the development of a powerful bureaucracy staffed with eunuch slaves in Gao. However, a series of military failures, most notably a terrible defeat at the hands of Muhammadu Kanta, the Sarkin of Kebbi, and a disastrous defeat against the Mossi where Muhammad Benkan personally showed cowardice, undermined his authority. He was deposed in 1537, and was succeeded by Askiya Isma'il son of Askiya al-hajj Muhammad. After attempting to regroup at Tindirma with his brother, he went into exile in Mali. Muhammad Bonkana went blind before he died in around 1559.
