= The Songhai =

Geographical region of Niger

Songhai Songhaytarey (meaning, "Songhai Homeland")
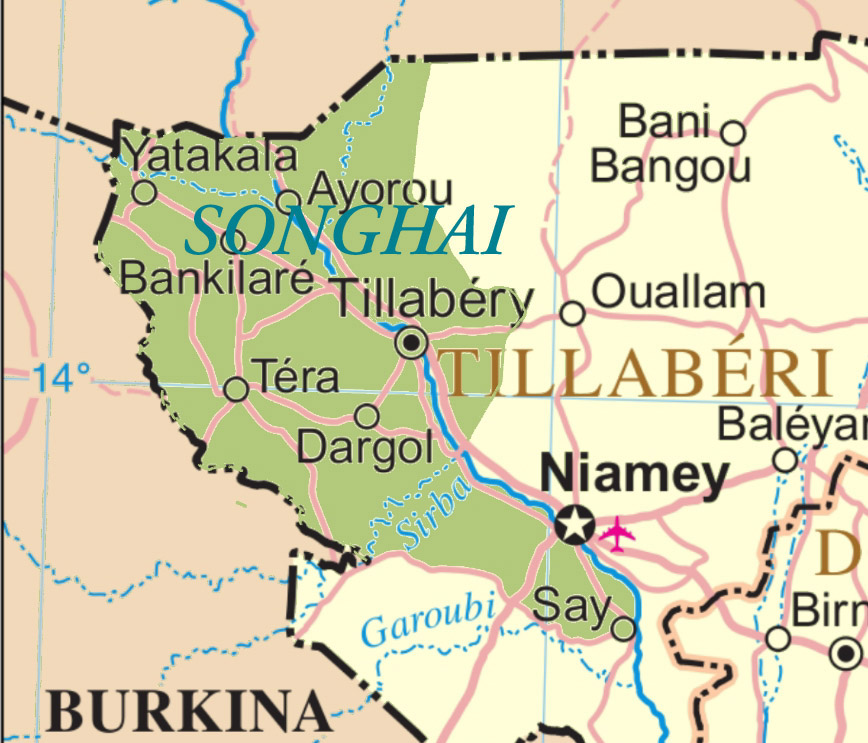
- Country: Niger
- Region: Tillabery Region (Southwestern Niger)

The Songhai (also Soŋay, Soŋaytaray ([soŋaj], [soŋajtaraj])) is an area in the northwestern corner of Niger's Tillabéri Region populated mainly by the Songhaiborai. It is considered the heartland of the Songhai people and the sanctuary of their ancient pantheon and priestly class and the place in which the original lineage of the Sonni dynasty retreated after the coup d'état of 1493 creating a secret society of magicians, the Sohance.

== History ==
The Songhay Empire grew out of a polity that was formed in this region of present-day Niger. This polity flourished in present-day Mali and replaced the Mali Empire as the major West Sudanese power with its capital as Gao. After being vanquished by incursions from Morocco, the Songhay state withdrew to its original homeland which is this region.

Pre-imperial Songhai

The first settlers to move back here from Gao were the Sonni dynasty in 1493 followed by the Askia dynasty in 1591 who also settled here and further south in the Dendiganda and established smaller kingdoms after the invasion of the Songhai Empire by the Saadi dynasty of Morocco.

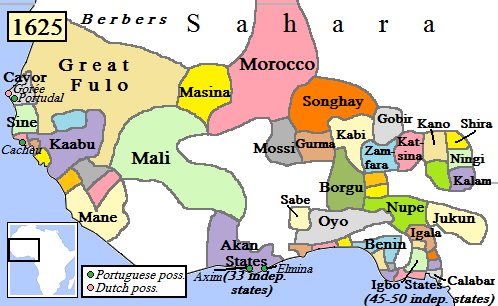
Songhai after the Moroccan invasion.

The nobles of the towns in this region trace their ancestry to two groups of Songhay nobility: the Si or Sonni Hamey (offspring of Sonni Ali Ber) and Mamar Hamey (offspring of Mamar or Maamar, that being the vernacular name of Askia Mohammad I). The primary dialect spoken in this region is Songhoyboro Ciine.
