= Gaya, Niger =

Coordinates: 11°53′16″N 03°26′48″E

Gaya
- Commune
- Interactive map of Gaya
- Country: Niger
- Region: Dosso
- Department: Gaya

Area
  - Commune: 109.4 sq mi (283.3 km^{2})
- Elevation: 594 ft (181 m)

Population (2012)
  - Commune: 63,815
  - Density: 583.4/sq mi (225.3/km^{2})
  - Urban: 45,465
- Time zone: UTC+1 (WAT)

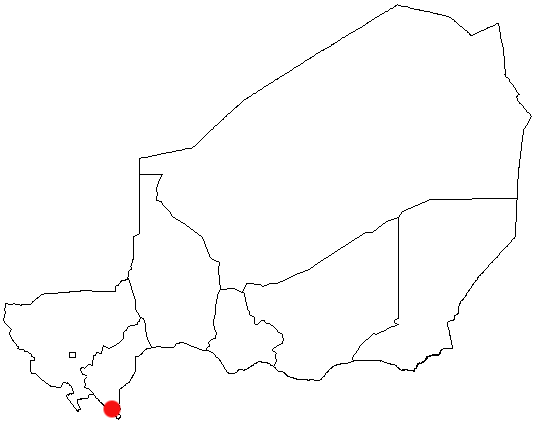
Location of Gaya in Niger

Gaya is a city in the Gaya Department of the Dosso Region of Niger. The city is situated 254 km southeast of the capital, Niamey, is located on the banks of the Niger River, and is near the borders with Benin and Nigeria. Gaya has a population of 63,815 (2012 census). The wettest area in Niger, Gaya averages 800 mm in rainfall a year.

There is a bridge connecting Gaya to the town of Malanville in Benin.

== Geography ==
Gaya is located in the south-west of the country on the Niger River in the Dendi landscape in the Sudan region. There is a border crossing to the neighbouring state of Benin near the city. Gaya's neighbouring municipalities in Niger are Tanda in the north-west, Bana in the north-east, Bengou in the east and Tounouga in the south-east.

The municipality is divided into 13 neighbourhoods and a rural area with nine villages, 39 hamlets and two camps. The neighbourhoods are called Bagueizé, Koiratégui II, Koiratégui III, Koussou, Koyzé Kounda, Lawaye, Plateau I, Plateau II, Quartier Bagueyzé, Quartier Peul, Sakabatama, Sakongui and Zongo.

=== Climate ===
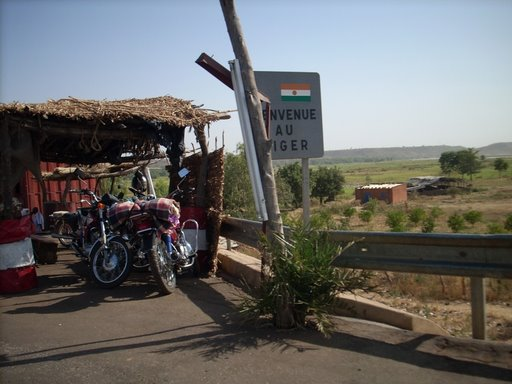
The road border entering Niger from Benin at Gaya.

The climate is an overlap between a hot semi arid climate and a tropical savanna climate (Koppen: BSh/Aw). The hottest month in Gaya is April and the coldest is January. In the period from 1977 to 2004, average monthly temperatures of 27.28 °C to 40.43 °C were measured in April and 18.74 °C to 33.33 °C in January. The average annual rainfall between 1931 and 2004 was 788.19 mm, a very high figure by national standards. Humidity varies between 20% in February and 80% in August.

Climate data for Gaya (1961–1990)
Month	Jan	Feb	Mar	Apr	May	Jun	Jul	Aug	Sep	Oct	Nov	Dec	Year
Mean maximum °C (°F)	37.1 (98.8)	40.1 (104.2)	42.2 (108.0)	42.8 (109.0)	41.6 (106.9)	38.5 (101.3)	35.7 (96.3)	34.6 (94.3)	35.5 (95.9)	38.1 (100.6)	38.4 (101.1)	37.1 (98.8)	42.8 (109.0)
Mean daily maximum °C (°F)	33.1 (91.6)	36.3 (97.3)	39.1 (102.4)	40.3 (104.5)	38.0 (100.4)	34.9 (94.8)	31.9 (89.4)	31.1 (88.0)	32.3 (90.1)	35.7 (96.3)	36.0 (96.8)	33.4 (92.1)	35.2 (95.4)
Daily mean °C (°F)	25.9 (78.6)	29.0 (84.2)	32.1 (89.8)	33.7 (92.7)	32.1 (89.8)	29.6 (85.3)	27.4 (81.3)	26.7 (80.1)	27.4 (81.3)	29.2 (84.6)	28.3 (82.9)	26.1 (79.0)	29.0 (84.2)
Mean daily minimum °C (°F)	18.6 (65.5)	21.6 (70.9)	25.1 (77.2)	27.1 (80.8)	26.3 (79.3)	24.3 (75.7)	22.8 (73.0)	22.4 (72.3)	22.4 (72.3)	22.8 (73.0)	20.5 (68.9)	18.7 (65.7)	22.7 (72.9)
Mean minimum °C (°F)	15.4 (59.7)	17.9 (64.2)	21.0 (69.8)	22.6 (72.7)	21.3 (70.3)	20.2 (68.4)	19.9 (67.8)	19.9 (67.8)	19.9 (67.8)	19.7 (67.5)	17.5 (63.5)	15.5 (59.9)	15.4 (59.7)
Average precipitation mm (inches)	0.0 (0.0)	1.4 (0.06)	2.6 (0.10)	16.2 (0.64)	70.7 (2.78)	125.0 (4.92)	177.6 (6.99)	225.6 (8.88)	160.1 (6.30)	17.1 (0.67)	0.1 (0.00)	0.1 (0.00)	796.5 (31.36)
Mean monthly sunshine hours	275.9	249.2	254.2	249.0	275.9	258.0	226.3	207.7	231.0	269.7	279.0	275.9	3,066
Mean daily sunshine hours	8.9	8.9	8.2	8.3	8.9	8.6	7.3	6.7	7.7	8.7	9.3	8.9	8.4
Source: NOAA

== History ==
Gaya was an important regional trading centre even before European colonization. According to legends, a Songhai named Alfa from the north settled in Gaya at the beginning of the 19th century. Alfa had three brothers who settled in Brigambou, Gawèye and Karey Kopto. The brothers and their descendants thus controlled important strategic points along a long stretch of the river. At the end of the 19th century, the townspeople lived in constant fear of raids by the Tukulor.

In the course of the military occupation of the later Niger colony by France, Gaya was initially incorporated into the French colony of Dahomey in 1899. In 1902, the city became part of the Third Military Territory (troisième Territoire militaire), from which the Military Territory of Niger (Territoire militaire du Niger) emerged in 1904. The French military base in Gaya had to be closed in 1903 and relocated to Kirtachi, as the unclear demarcation between the French sphere of influence and British Nigeria caused too much uncertainty.

Local elections were held for the first time in 2002. Teacher Hassimi Dambaro (MNSD-Nassara) became mayor.

== Demographics ==
In the 2012 census, the municipality had 63,815 inhabitants. Around 45,000 people lived in the urban area. The strong immigration is due to the economic importance of the city and leads to a lively real estate activity. The city is home to a large number of ethnic groups that settled here between the 16th and 19th centuries. Among the most important are Tyenga, Songhai, Zarma, various Hausa groups and Fulbe.

Census	Population
2001	40,903
2012	63,815

== Culture ==
One of the special festivals in Gaya is the annual fishing festival, which also attracts young people from Benin and Nigeria. There is also an annual festival where the river spirits are invoked. The martial art lutte traditionnelle, which is popular throughout Niger, is called denbé in Gaya. A Roman Catholic chapel was built in 1997.

== Economy ==
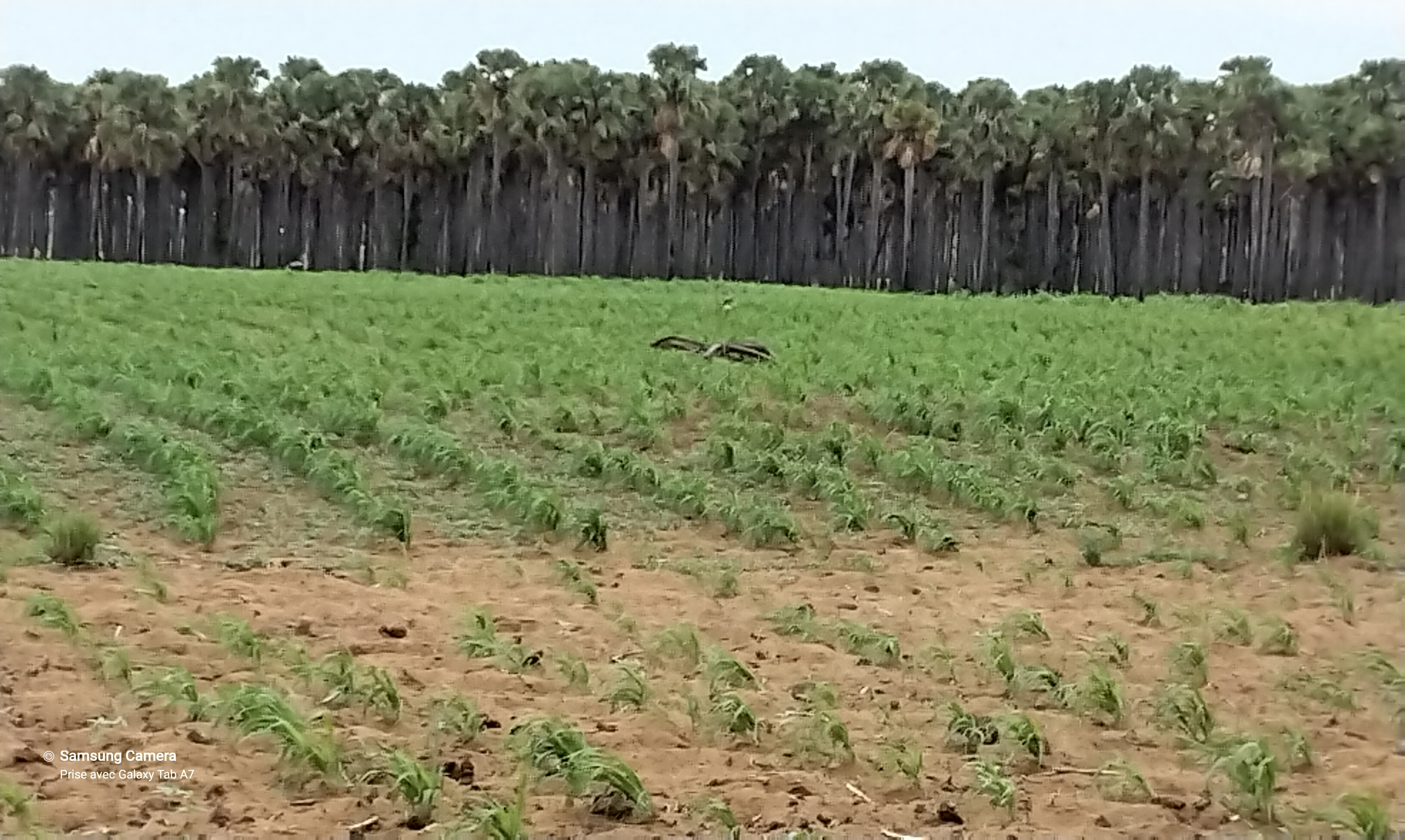
Agriculture in Gaya (2023)

Gaya is particularly important for trade with Benin and Nigeria, where livestock and plant-based foods such as black-eyed peas and peanuts are sold and where sweet potatoes and ready-made products come from. Cereals, peanuts and black-eyed peas are also sold from Gaya to other areas of Niger.

Particularly in the eastern and north-eastern parts of Gaya, for example in the Plateau district, the cityscape is characterised by large warehouses. The rainfall favors agricultural activities.

== See also ==
- Bayajidda
