= Askia Musa =

- Emperor of the Songhai Empire
- Reign: 1529–1531
- Predecessor: Askia al-hajj Mohammad (ruled 1493–1529)
- Successor: Askia Mohammad Bonkana
- Died: 1531; Mansur or Mansoûra
- Issue: None
- Dynasty: Askia dynasty
- Father: Askia al-hajj Mohammad
- Mother: Kamsa or Zāra Kabirun-koi

Askia Musa or Askiya Musa (ruled 1529–1531) was the second Askia ruler of the Songhai Empire.

== Early life ==
Musa was the son of Askia Mohammad I and Zāra Kabirun-koi, a princess from Gobir who had been captured in a campaign against Borgu in 1505. Regarded as the firstborn son, Musa was given the prominent post of fari-mondio (in charge of imperial revenue).

== Rise to Power ==
Towards the end of his reign, Askia Mohammad had become blind, and thereby increasingly dependent on Ali Fulan, the Hugu-koray-koi (Master of the Palace interior). None of the Askia's sons were aware of this because Ali Fulan stuck so close to his side as aid (at this time blindness would have disqualified a ruler as he would have been expected to lead his army into battle, as well as being a bad omen). On one occasion, Ali advised that Mohammed's younger son Balla be appointed to the vacant position of Benga-farma (governor of Benga). When the older sons heard about this, they were angered at being passed over. Musa in particular was angry at his father and with Ali Fulan; he accused him of turning the Askia into a puppet and forced him to flee to exile in Tindirma in 1528.

The next year, Musa met with some of his brothers in Kukiya, seemingly preparing to launch a rebellion against their father. The kanfari Yahya, the Askia's brother, was sent to negotiate with them, but they insulted and killed him. On 15 Aug 1529, at the Eid al-Adha prayer in Gao, Musa proclaimed his ascension to the Askiyate, and his father acquiesced.

== Reign ==
Musa was an arrogant and violent ruler, and quickly alienated the brothers and cousins who had supported his coup. Ismail, Benga-farma Balla, the new kanfari Uthman Yawbobo and others assembled in Tindirma to plot a rebellion. Musa marched west and managed to sway some of the conspirators to re-join him, then defeated the rest at the battle of Akagan east of Timbuktu. He appointed Mohammed Bonkana Kirya to replace Yawbobo. Ismail fled to the Tuareg. Balla was captured in Timbuktu and buried alive.

Still insecure, Musa continued exiling and killing a number of his brothers and between 25 and 35 of his cousins. In 1531 a group of his brothers led by Mohammed Bonkana Kirya, ‘Ali Wāy, and Ishaq plotted against him and killed him.
