= Diallan =

- Commune and town
- Location in Mali
- Coordinates: 14°12′22″N 10°9′40″W
- Country: Mali
- Region: Kayes Region
- Cercle: Bafoulabé Cercle
- Elevation: 761 ft (232 m)

Population (2009)
  - Total: 14,635
- Time zone: UTC+0 (GMT)

Diallan or Dialla is a town and commune in the Cercle of Bafoulabé in the Kayes Region of south-western Mali. In the 2009 census the commune had a population of 14,635.

== History ==
Diallan was an important town during the Mali Empire, and the site of a Madugu (royal palace). In 1501 it was besieged by Umar Komajago, the Kurmina-fari of the Songhai Empire, but resisted. Komajago was reinforced by Askia Muhammad I, and together they sacked the town and the palace, eventually ending Malian hegemony on the north bank of the Senegal River.
