= Gaya Department =

Coordinates: 12°10′53″N 3°32′06″E

Gaya
- Department
- Gaya Department location in the region
- Country: Niger
- Region: Dosso Region

Area
  - Total: 950 sq mi (2,470 km^{2})

Population (2012)
  - Total: 261,638
  - Density: 274/sq mi (106/km^{2})
- Time zone: UTC+1 (GMT 1)

Gaya is a department of the Dosso Region in Niger. Its capital lies at the city of Gaya. As of 2012, the department had a total population of 261,638 people.

== Communes ==
- Bana
- Bengou
- Gaya
- Tanda
- Tounounga
- Yelou
