= Kurmina-fari =

Title for the administrator of the western half of the Songhai Empire

The Kurmina-fari or Kanfari was the title of a major administrative and military position in the Songhai Empire. The position was broadly in charge of the western half of the empire, and was based in Tindirma. The position was created by Askia Mohammad I in 1494 soon after he took power from Sonni Ali. His brother Umar Komadiago was the first Kurmina-fari, and several of his sons would hold the position after him. The Kurmina-fari was often the eldest son or brother of the ruling Askia.

== List of Kurmina-fari ==
This list comes from the Tarikh al-Sudan. Dates and english spellings are derived mostly from Michael A. Gomez's book African Dominion: A New History of Empire in Early and Medieval West Africa.

- Umar Komadiago b. Abu Bakr, 1494–1520
- Yahya b. Abu Bakr, 1520–1529
- Uthman Yawbobo, 1529–1530
- Mohammed Bonkana Kirya, 1530–1531
- Uthman Tinfarin, 1531–1537
- Hammad Aryao b. Mohammad Kirai, 1537–1539
- ‘Alī Kusira, 1539–1543
- Dāwūd, 1543–1549
- Kashiya b. ‘Uthmān Tinfarin, 1549-15??
- Ya’qūb b. Askia Mohammad I, 15??-1578
- Muḥammad Bonkana b. Dāwūd, 1578–1582
- Al-Hādī b. Dāwūd, 1582–1584
- Ṣāliḥ b. Dāwūd, 1584-March 1588
- Mahmud b. Ismail, 1588-1592
