= Mali Yaro =

Nigerien singer

- Also known as: The Goumbé Star
- Born: Abdoulaye Boureima; January 1, 1973 (age 53)
- Origin: Téra, Niger
- Genres: Songhai Music
- Occupation: Singer
- Years active: 1995 – present

Abdoulaye Boureima (born 1 January 1973), popularly known as Mali Yaro, is a Nigerien Songhai musician. He began his artistic career as a young goumbé player (a traditional songhai music instrument made of a calabash covered with cowhide). Then, together with friends, formed in 1996 a music group, the Goumbé Stars. Mali Yaro songs were about love, rejoicing and a call for cohesion. Mali Yaro has produced 9 albums.

He has performed in the Netherlands, Morocco, Belgium and the United States and in several other countries in Africa and elsewhere.

== Early life ==
Mali Yaro was born in Sirfi Koira, a town in the Tillaberi Region of Niger. Mali Yaro dropped out of school in 1987 due to his love for music and travelled to the Nigerien Capital, Niamey in pursuit of his ambition.

== Career ==
Mali Yaro became a minor celebrity entertainer in the city's nightlife in the late 1990s, using the characteristic songhai goumbé instrument and rhythms. In 1995, Mali founded his band, the "Goumbé star" band. In the 2000s, Mali issued five albums between 2000 and 2010.

He recorded his first album in 2000 "Mali Bero" where he paid homage to the great warrior of the Zarma people, Mali Bero. In 2002, he released his second album Walambandi, in which he talked about the problems encountered by the Nigerien society. His third album was released in 2005 dedicated to Women. His fourth album, Peace released in January 2008 at a time when Niger was going through insecurity in its north, he invited the rebels and the military to lay down their arms for a united and prosperous Niger. In 2010, Mali Yaro released his fifth album Toula.

== Awards ==
Mali Yaro received the Goodwill Ambassador for street children in Niamey for his philanthropic activities.
