= Sama Foulala =

- Commune and village
- Location in Mali
- Coordinates: 13°22′58″N 6°30′33″W
- Country: Mali
- Region: Ségou Region
- Cercle: Ségou Cercle

Area
  - Total: 154 km^{2} (59 sq mi)

Population (2009 census)
  - Total: 6,180
  - Density: 40.1/km^{2} (104/sq mi)
- Time zone: UTC+0 (GMT)

Sama Foulala is a village and rural commune in the Cercle of Ségou in the Ségou Region of southern-central Mali. The commune contains 7 villages in an area of approximately 154 square kilometers. In the 2009 census it had a population of 6,180. The village of Sama Foulala, is on the left (north) bank of the River Niger.

Sama Foulala and its older sister town Sama Markala were historically part of the province of Kala.
