= Umar Komajago =

15th/16th-century kanfari of the Songhai Empire

Kanfari or Kurmina-fari
- Monarch: Askia Mohammad I
- Succeeded by: Yahya

Personal details
- Died: February 22, 1520 Tindirma

Umar Komajago, also spelled Konjaago, Komadiaga and many other variants, was the Kanfari, or ruler of the western provinces, of the Songhai Empire under his brother Askia Mohammad I from 1494 until his death in 1520.

Deputized by his brother to subdue the rebellious city of Dia soon after seizing power, Umar's victory was so complete that he was given the title 'Kumadiagha', meaning 'the conqueror of Diagha [Dia]'. Askia Mohammad also created the position of Kurmina-fari (often shortened to Kanfari) for him. Two years later Umar re-built the town of Tindirma to serve as his capital. During the Askia's pilgrimage to Mecca, Umar ruled the empire loyally and competently in his absence.

In 1501 he attacked the important Malian town of Diallan, and was initially repulsed until reinforced by the Askia. In 1512 Umar defeated and killed the Fula leader Tenguella after a 2-month march through the desert, bringing the Kingdom of Diarra into the Songhai sphere of influence.

Umar's family became a pillar of the royal clan of Songhai, and his son Mohammad Benkan Kirya ruled as Askia from 1531 to 1537.

== Sources ==
- Gomez, Michael (2018). African dominion : a new history of empire in early and medieval West Africa. Princeton, NJ: Princeton University Press. ISBN 9780691177427.
- Kane, Oumar (2004). La première hégémonie peule. Le Fuuta Tooro de Koli Teηella à Almaami Abdul. Paris: Karthala.
