= Kala (province) =

Kala was a province of the Mali Empire and later the Songhai Empire, in modern-day Mali. Historically the term applied to the territory on both banks of the Niger River upstream of the Inner Niger Delta, north of Bendugu. By the 18th century the term was restricted to the north bank.

== History ==
Kala was taken from Mali Empire by Sonni Ali in the 1470s.In the mid 1500s Kala was the southwestern border of the Songhai Empire, with neighboring territories still falling under Mali's domination. In 1591 the province rebelled, forcing Askia Ishaq II to campaign there. At the pivotal Battle of Jenne in 1599, the Kala Cha'a joined side of the Pashalik of Timbuktu rather than the Malimansa, but later helped the defeated Mansa escape. In 1645, a Bambara revolt destroyed the province, although the Traore petty kings remained, gradually falling under the Segou Empire. In the early 18th century the region was devastated by the invasion of the Kong Empire.

== Government ==
Under Mali Kala was ruled by the Fala Faren, based in Kokry. Under Songhai the office was called Cha'a. Other towns in Kala province included Sama, Niono, Sansanding, and Sibila.
