= Sama Markala =

- Village
- Location in Mali
- Coordinates: 13.376326575643015°N 6.49289016604911513°W
- Country: Mali
- Region: Ségou Region
- Cercle: Ségou Cercle
- Commune: Sama Foulala

Population
  - Ethnicities: Marka people
- Time zone: UTC+0 (GMT)

Sama Markala is a village in the Ségou Region of southern-central Mali on the left (north) bank of the River Niger.

== History ==
Sama is an ancient town founded by the Soninke Koummo and Sako clans, and ruled by the Sogore.

Sama, under the name Samaqanda, appears in some of the earliest written sources on the history of West Africa, including al Yaqubi, ibn Hawkal and al Bakri. It was famous as the home of the best archers in the region, and a part of the Wagadu Empire.

In 1477 the Mossi invaded the Songhai Empire and took Sama on their way to sacking Walata.

In 1537 Sama was a town near the frontier between the Mali Empire and the Songhai Empire. The Songhai Askia Mohammed Benkan was sent to exile there in 1537.

== Culture ==
Sama was the site of the most powerful Komo shrine in the area, and plays a prominent role in Mandinka mythology.
