= Mahmud Kati =

16th-century Songhai scholar

Al Hajj Mahmud Kati (or Mahmoud Kati) (1468? – 1552 or 1593) was an African Muslim Songhai scholar. He is traditionally held to be the author of the West African chronicle Tarikh al-fattash, though the authorship is contested.

Kati grew up in Kurmina but lived most of his adult life in Timbuktu. In August 1583, he documented a meteor shower. His tomb is the second largest in Timbuktu, after that of Mohammed Bagayogo, and is a site of pilgrimage.
