= Niger–Nigeria relations =

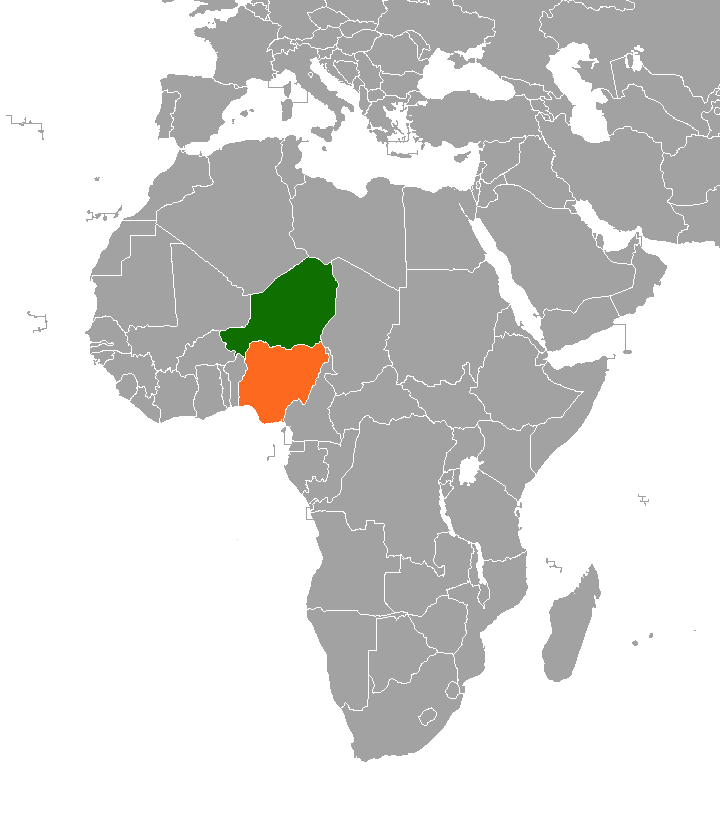

- Niger: Nigeria

Niger–Nigeria relations refer to the current and historical relationship between Niger and Nigeria, two neighbouring countries in West Africa. Relations are based on a long shared border and common cultural and historical interactions.

== Shared history ==
The 1,500-kilometre-long (930-mile) border between Niger to the north and Nigeria to the south cuts through one of the more densely populated areas of both nations. Culturally, the center and west of this border bisect the northern section of Hausaland: the home of the Hausa people. Prior to the turn of the 20th century, there was no formal border here, but the current line is roughly the northern reach of the 19th century Sokoto Caliphate. City-states south of this — such as Katsina, Kano, and Sokoto — were allied in a system of Islamic Fulani jihad states. Areas to the north — Maradi, the Gobir refugee state, and the Sultanate of Damagaram — resisted the Sokoto Caliphate. Both areas were culturally Hausaphone in the center and west, and Kanuri in the east. In the east, both sides of the present border had been part of the Bornu Empire.

The expansion of French and British imperialism in the period 1890–1905 demarcated the line which would become the modern Niger – Nigeria border. During colonial rule, the French and English languages were implanted on each side of the border, along with cultural, educational and political traditions. Rival French and British interests meant that during much of the colonial period trade and relations across this border was dissuaded.

Niger, entirely landlocked, was supplied with access to the sea through fellow French West Africa colonies in modern Benin, Togo, and points west. From 1941 to 1943, the French Niger colony was loyal to German-occupied France, and the border between the colonies was completely closed. Despite this, common Hausa language and cultural ties meant that there was much informal trade and travel over the long border during the colonial period.

== Development of bilateral relations ==
Since independence in 1960, the two states pursued close relations. Each side has based diplomatic relations upon non-interference in the internal affairs of the other. During the Nigerian Civil War, President of Niger Hamani Diori was an active mediator in the conflict.

Each side has also strongly appealed to its former colonial powers for support in defense and, unlike Nigerian-Cameroonian or Nigerien-Beninois relations, there have been no serious border conflicts. Hausa language and cultural ties are strong, but there is little interest in a pan-Hausa state. The division of Lake Chad, although forced to go to mediation between Chad, Cameroon, Niger, and Nigeria, awaits formal settlement and has not been a source of tension between Niamey and Abuja.

Nigeria has an embassy in Niamey, while Niger maintains an embassy in Abuja.

== Commerce ==
The cities of southern Niger and Northern Nigeria have been linked in the Trans-Saharan trade going back to the medieval period. Cities such as Kano and Katsina have long been the southern terminus of trade networks which sustain much of Niger's economy. Nigeria benefits from the trade and agricultural sales (especially Nigerien cattle taken to Nigerian markets), while Niger's most direct routes to overseas trade are through Nigeria's and Benin's railway systems.

== Agreements and organization ==
Each nation plays active roles in continental multilateral organizations, are members of the Economic Community of West African States (ECOWAS) trade bloc, the African Union, African Development Bank, UEMOA, CILSS, Council of Understanding, and the ALG. Bilaterally, the two nations formed the Nigeria-Niger Joint Commission for Cooperation (NNJC), established in March, 1971 with its Permanent Secretariat in Niamey, Niger.

== Ecology ==
Niger's water supply is almost entirely dependent of cross border sources, while northern Nigeria is almost as dependent on the waters of the Niger River and Lake Chad. Both areas face rapid desertification and increasing demands for water. The two nations are members of the Niger Basin Authority (successor to the 1964 Niger River Commission), the Lake Chad Commission, and the Niger-Nigeria Joint Committee has special focus on water and water development issues. Both nations are signatories of The Enugu Agreement (3 December 1977) on common regulations for fauna and flora among the member states of the Lake Chad Basin Commission (Cameroon, Niger, Nigeria and Chad). On 15 January 1990 the two nations signed The Abuja Agreement on control of desertification, promotion of conservation, rational utilization and development of lands, water resources, flora and fauna. The Maiduguri Agreement, signed on 18 July 1990, and amended 5 October 1998, further deals with development, conservation, and utilization of the water resources of transboundary catchments. The Maiduguri Agreement and Abuja Agreement are overseen by the NNJC.

== 2023 conflict ==
Following the 2023 Nigerien coup d'état, Nigerian President Bola Tinubu advocated for military intervention into the 2023 Nigerien crisis.

== See also ==
- Foreign relations of Niger
- Foreign relations of Nigeria
- Niger-Nigeria border

== Sources ==
- Finn Fuglestad. A History of Niger: 1850–1960. Cambridge University Press (1983) ISBN 0-521-25268-7
- Jolijn Geels. Niger. Bradt UK/ Globe Pequot Press USA (2009) ISBN 978-1-84162-152-4
- Samuel Decalo. Historical Dictionary of Niger (3rd ed.). Scarecrow Press, Boston & Folkestone, (1997) ISBN 0-8108-3136-8
