= Zin Kibaru =

Blind river-dwelling spirit in Songhai mythology

In the mythology of the African Songhai people, Zin Kibaru or Zinkibaru is a blind, river-dwelling spirit who commands fish.
