= Tomb of Askia =

UNESCO World Heritage Site
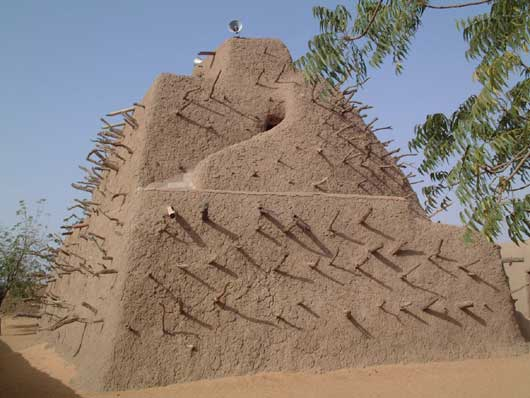
- Tomb of Askia

- Location within Mali
- Location: Gao, Mali
- Criteria: Cultural: (ii), (iii), (iv)
- Reference: 1139
- Inscription: 2004 (28th Session)
- Endangered: 2012–...
- Area: 4.24 ha (456,000 sq ft)
- Buffer zone: 82.7 ha (8,900,000 sq ft)
- Coordinates: 16°17′23″N 0°02′40″W

The Tomb of Askia, in Gao, Mali, is believed to be the burial place of Askia Muhammad I, one of the Songhai Empire's most prolific emperors. It was built at the end of the fifteenth century and is designated as a UNESCO World Heritage Site. Although Askia Mohammed I is the only individual who was buried within the tomb, several other Askias are buried in the courtyard.

UNESCO describes the tomb as a fine example of the monumental mud-building traditions of the West African Sahel. The complex includes the pyramidal tomb, two mosques, a cemetery and an assembly ground. At 17 metres (56 ft) in height, it is the largest pre-colonial architectural monument in Gao. It is a notable example of the Sudano-Sahelian architectural style that later spread throughout the region.

The tomb remains in use as place of worship and publicly owned cultural centre for the city of Gao. The tomb complex and a buffer area around it are protected by both national and local laws.

== History ==
Askia Mohammed I was the first Askia emperor and expanded the Songhai Empire. As a devoted Muslim, he felt obligated to make his pilgrimage to Mecca, which he returned from in 1497/8. He brought back with him the materials to make his tomb; all of the mud and wood came from Mecca. The caravan is said to have consisted of "thousands of camels". It was structured as a house, with several rooms and passageways and was sealed when Askia Mohammed died.

Relatively recent modifications to the site have included the expansion of the mosque buildings in the 1960s and mid-1970s, and the 1999 construction of a wall around the site. Electricity was added in the early 2000s, allowing for ceiling fans, lights and a loudspeaker mounted on top.

The tomb has been regularly replastered throughout its history, a process essential to the maintenance and repair of the mud structures.

== Gallery ==
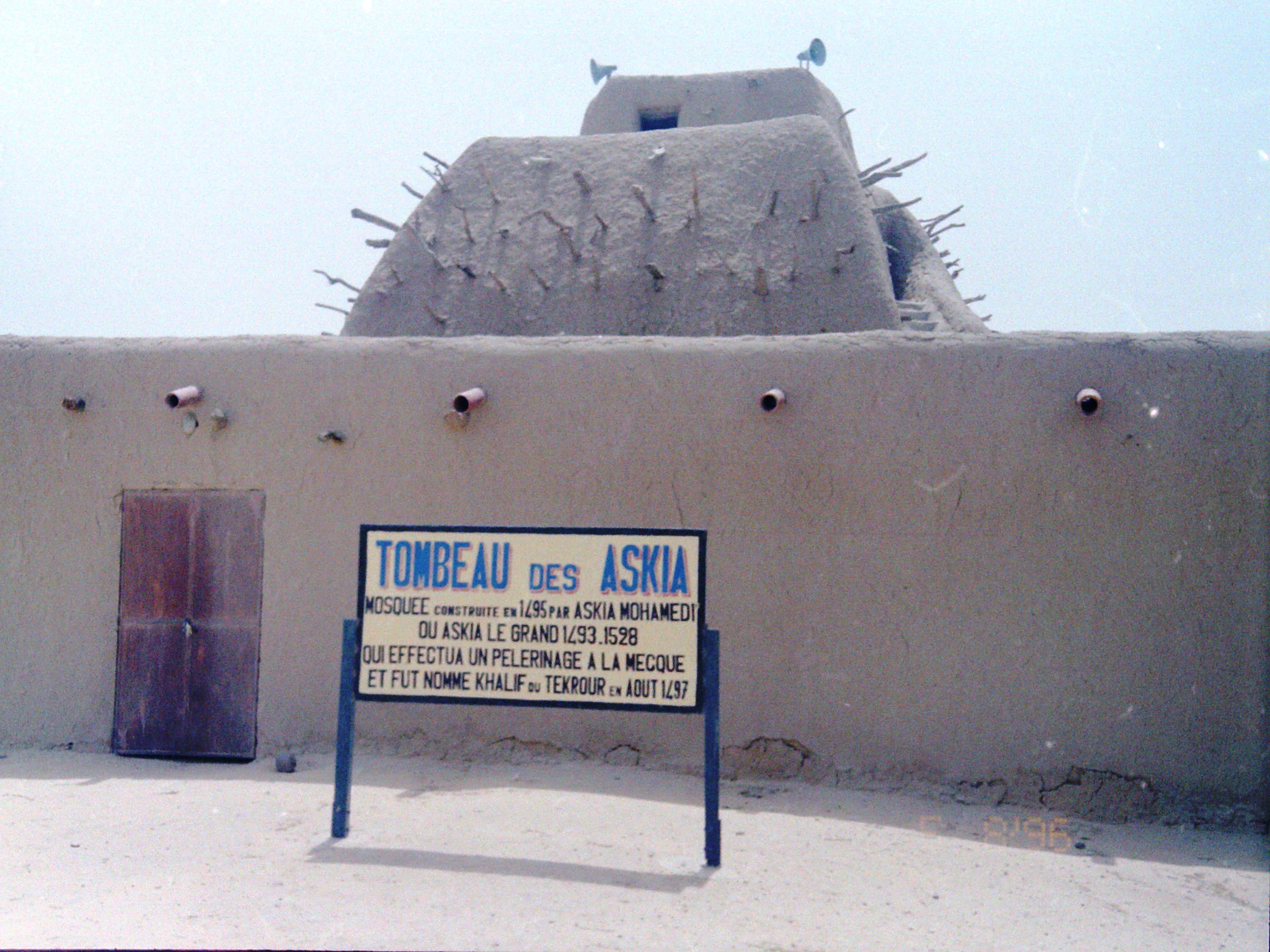
The inner wall, made out of mud, circa 2017

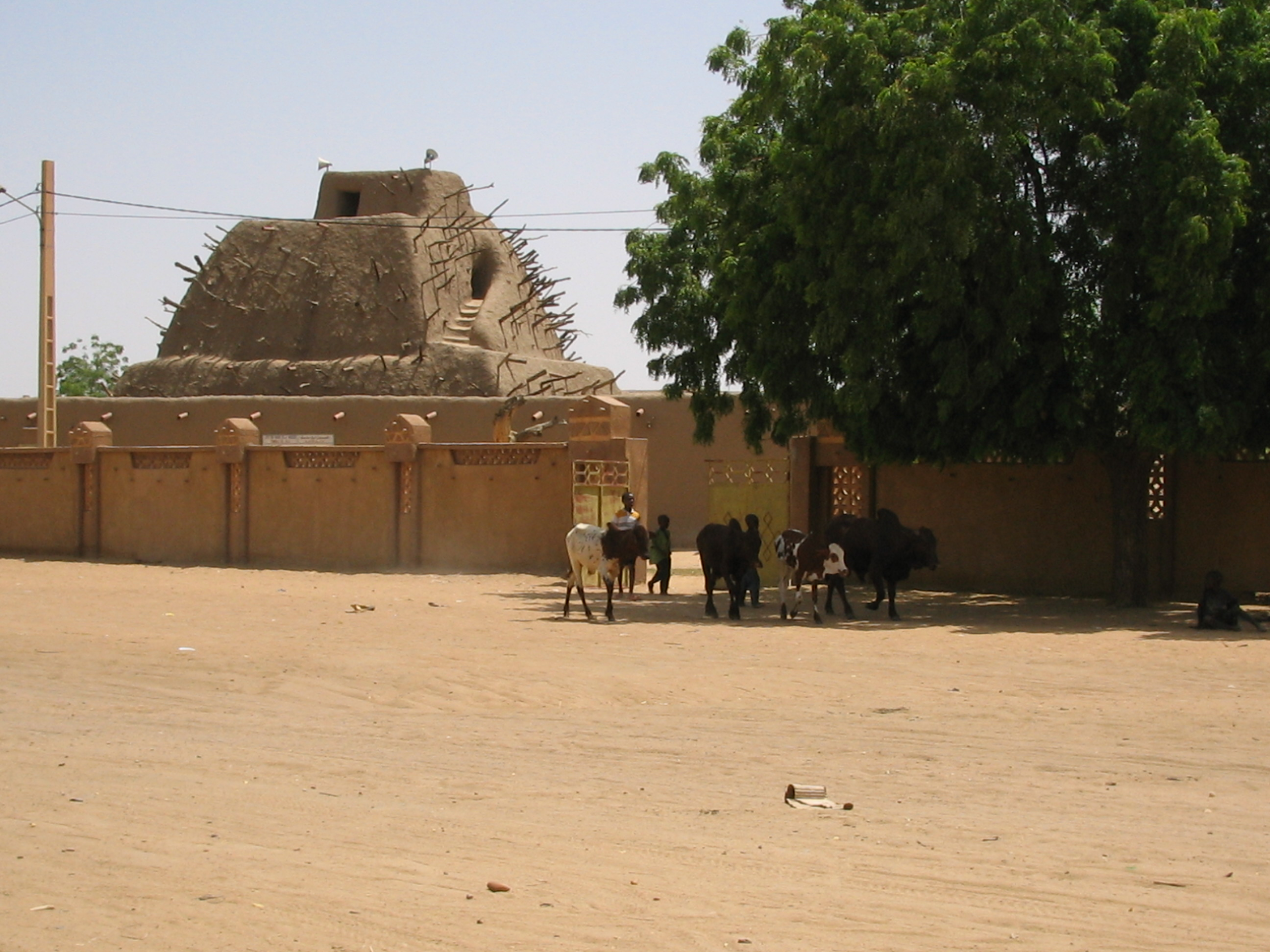
The outer wall of the tomb, circa 2006
