= Goffa =

Songhai women headwear

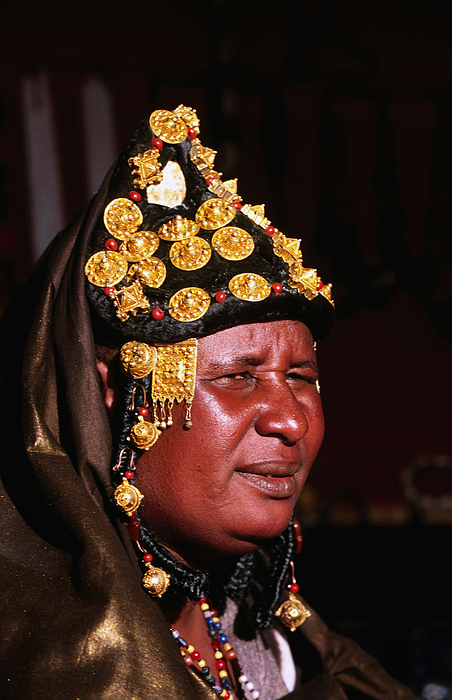
Songhai woman wearing Goffa at a festival

The Goffa is a traditional hairstyle or headwear deeply embedded in the cultures of the Songhai and Tuareg people, particularly in northern Mali and Niger. Exclusively worn by married women, it serves as a cultural identifier during significant events to visually distinguish married women from their unmarried counterparts.

== Description ==
The distinctive feature of the Goffa is its braids interwoven with gold or silver adornments, known as Kurkuru, reflecting the perceived affluence of the wearer's family. Historically, this hairstyle was a symbol of prestige and costliness, limiting its use to a select few.

== Cultural significance ==
In Songhai and Tuareg communities, the Goffa symbolizes a crown worn by women to represent their dignity and honor. An adage in Songhai language Yela ni gofa ma si kaw ni ni ce ga, emphasizes the role of the Goffa in reminding women of their esteemed status without implying any inherent superiority. The Goffa holds historical significance in Timbuktu, where it was notably worn by queens. This association has led to its colloquial designation as 'the hairstyle of the queens,' emphasizing its historical connection without implying any contemporary hierarchy.

== Evolution and accessibility ==
In the past, the Goffa was a luxury reserved for the economically privileged. However, contemporary variations and the availability of replicas and wigs have democratized its accessibility, allowing a broader spectrum of individuals to embrace this cultural tradition. As a symbol of marital status, dignity, and historical affluence, the Goffa continues to evolve, maintaining its relevance as a vibrant expression of cultural identity among the Songhai and Tuareg.
