= Sikié =

- Location in Niger
- Coordinates: 13°38′N 1°51′E
- Country: Niger
- Region: Tillabéri Region
- Department: Kollo Department

Sikié (also Sikièye, Sikiay, Sikiey ) is a Songhai town near Namaro in Niger. Sikié was the place where the defeated Songhai Empire army led by Askia Muhammed Gao installed their base hoping for a possible passage of the Moroccan army.

== History ==
Sikiè was one of those places where the Askia dynasty settled after the fall of the Songhai Empire in 1591. In the mid-17th century, Sikié was part of the dominion of Ginde Marieizé, the ruler of Namaro.

== Geography ==
The town, led by a traditional chief, is located around 16 kilometers southeast of Namaro which belongs to the department of Kollo in the Tillabéri region of Niger. Sikiè is located on the right bank of the Niger River . The larger villages in the area include Karma in the northwest and Yonkoto in the southeast. The landscape around Sikié is characterized by large sand dunes and river terraces.

== Economy and Society ==
The inhabitants are predominantly farmers who grow cassava, pumpkins and rice. These commodities are mostly sold at to the neighboring towns of Namaro, Boubon and Karma . In 2013, a group of investors from Malaysia planned to establish a 766 hectares industrial livestock production complex in Sikié and neighboring towns of Yonkoto.
