= Timbuktu Chronicles =

Timbuktu Chronicles is the collective name for a group of writings created in Timbuktu in the second half of the 17th century. They form a distinct genre of taʾrīkh (history). There are three surviving works and a probable lost one.

- Tarikh al-Sudan, "History of the Sudan" (c. 1655), written by al-Saʿdi
- Tarikh al-fattash, "The Researcher's Chronicle" (late 17th century), also called the Tarikh Ibn al-Mukhtar ("Ibn al-Mukhtar's Chronicle")
- Notice historique (between 1657 and 1669), an anonymous untitled text conventionally known by the title of the French translation
- Durar al-Ḥisan fī akhbār baʿḍ mulūk al-Sūdān, "Pearls of Beauties Concerning What is Related About Some Kings of the Sudan", by Baba Goro, a lost work that probably belonged to the Timbuktu taʾrīkh genre.

== See also ==
- Timbuktu Manuscripts

== Bibliography ==
- Hale, Thomas A. (2007). Griots and Griottes: Masters of Words and Music. Indiana University Press. ISBN 9780253219619.
- Moraes Farias, Paulo F. de (2008). "Intellecutal Innovation and the Reinvention of the Sahel: The Seventeenth-Century Timbuktu Chronicles". In Shamil Jeppie; Souleymane Bachir Diagne (eds.). The Meanings of Timbuktu (PDF). HSRC Press. pp. 95–108.
- Nobili, Mauro (2018). "New Reinventions of the Sahel: Reflections on the Tārikh Genre in the Timbuktu Historiographical Production, Seventeenth to Twentieth Centuries". In Green, Toby; Rossi, Benedetta (eds.). Landscapes, Sources and Intellectual Projects of the West African Past: Essays in Honour of Paulo Fernando de Moraes Farias. Brill. ISBN 9789004380189.
