= Tounounga =

- Commune and village
- Location in Niger
- Coordinates: 11°48′04″N 3°37′22″E
- Country: Niger
- Region: Dosso
- Department: Gaya

Population (2010)
  - Total: 39,495
- Time zone: UTC+1 (WAT)

Tounounga is a village and rural commune in Niger.
