= Tsernaoua =

Coordinates: 13°53′N 5°21′E

- Commune and village
- Interactive map of Tsernaoua
- Country: Niger
- Region: Tahoua
- Department: Birni-N'Konni

Area
  - Total: 123.5 sq mi (319.9 km^{2})

Population (2012 census)
  - Total: 73,705
  - Density: 596.7/sq mi (230.4/km^{2})
- Time zone: UTC+1 (WAT)

Tsernaoua is a village and rural commune in Niger.
