= Battle of Anfao =

1493 battle

Date	April 12, 1493
Location	Outside of Gao, Songhai Empire
Result	Sonni dynasty overthrown, the reign of Askia dynasty begins

Belligerents
Rebel troops led by Muhammad Askia: Askia dynasty	Songhai Empire: Sonni dynasty

The battle of Anfao was fought between the troops of rebel General Muhammad Askia and Sonni Baru, the legitimate ruler of the Songhai Empire on April 12, 1493, at Anfao, outside the capital of Gao, on the upper Niger. Despite being outnumbered, Askia's troops won the day. The victory of Muhammad Askia ended the Sonni dynasty.

== Sources ==
- The History of Africa: The Quest for Eternal Harmony, Molefi Kete Asante
- The Cinematic Griot: The Ethnography of Jean Rouch, Paul Stoller
- "Muhammad I Askia". Encyclopedia Britannica.
