= Mali Bero =

Legendary Zarma figure

- Zarmakoy
- Died: Sargane, Niger
- Burial: Niger
- Father: Zabarkane
- Religion: Islam

Mali Bero (Mali the Great or Eldest) or Zarmakoy Sombo is a mythical legendary leader of the Zarma people of western Niger who led them in their migration from an unknown region in Mali eastward to western Niger several centuries ago. The story of Mali Bero has appeared in various forms in the Zarma society from poems, songs and oral narratives by griots. No one, however, has published a linear version of the story of Mali Bero that is more than a few hundred lines long. Mali Bero, however, is believed to be the son of Zabarkane, another Zarma legendary figure

== Oral Tradition ==
For the Zarmas, the most important message is their migration eastward led by Mali Bero via "Barma Daba", a flying millet silo bottom (a flat and round surface made of wooden straw that serves as foundation for a temporary silo). The incident that prompted the migration was the fight between the Zarma and nomadic children, often identified as Fula or Tuareg.

== Migration ==
According to oral tradition, Mali Bero decided one day to leave his village following a fight between one of his villagers and a child from neighboring village of the Fulani and Tuareg during a swim in the pond of "Mallé". The children of these villages had the habit of taking the clothes of the children from the village of Mali Béro to wipe their bodies after taking their baths in the pond. The children from the village of Mali Béro decided one day not to accept this and planned a revenge if the act is repeated. When the act was repeated, one child from the other village was killed by another child from the village of Mali Bero. Upon hearing the news that one of his offspring has killed a child from the neighboring village, Mali Béro gathered his village and offered them to leave urgently to prevent the situation from degenerating in the event the other village decide to take revenge. He ordered them to urgently collect millet stalks for making the “Barma Daba”. Quickly, they made the "Barma Daba" in which they entered to embark on a flight in search for a new territory. After series of stops, they finally landed in Sargane, a village in present-day Niger . Mali Béro remained in Sargane until he died. He is buried in this same village which is found in the Ouallam Department. The tomb where Mali was buried remains an attraction for tourists, students and researchers.
