= Sonni dynasty =

Songhai Empire ruling dynasty until 1493

The Sonni dynasty, Sunni dynasty or Si dynasty was a dynasty of rulers of the Songhai Empire of medieval West Africa. The origins of the dynasty lies in its predecessor Za Dynasty. The last ruler, Sonni Baru, ruled until 1493 when the throne was usurped by the Askiya Muhammad I, the founder of the Askiya dynasty.

== Sources ==
The seventeenth century chronicles, the Tarikh al-Sudan and the Tarikh al-fattash describe the history of the Songhay people and provide lists of their rulers. The Tarikh al-Sudan gives a list of the earlier rulers of the Za dynasty, whose founder Za Alayaman lived before the 10th century and the arrival of Islam. The two chronicles agree on the first and last rulers of the dynasty but differ on the number and order of the intervening rulers.

== Debate Over Origins ==
The chronicles describe how Ali Kulun (or Ali Golom), the founder of the Sunni dynasty, revolted against the hegemony of the Mali Empire. Both associate him with the Mali court. The Tarikh al-Sudan relates that his father was Za Yasoboy, and as a son of a subordinate ruler of the Mali Empire he had to serve the Mansa. Assuming that Ali Kulun really existed, Hunwick estimated his revolt to have occurred in the early 14th century. Others have disputed this, however. Paolo de Moraes-Farias, citing contemporary epigraphic evidence and the existence of a giant of the same name in Tuareg mythology, argues that this founder, and likely his successor as well, were invented by the chroniclers.

Al-Sadi, the author of the Tarikh al-Sudan uses the word Sunni or Sonni for the name of the dynasty while the Tarikh al-fattash uses the forms chi and si'i. The word may have a Malinke origin meaning "a subordinate or confidant of the ruler", referring to their status as vassals of the Mali Empire.

Dierk Lange disputes both the idea that the Sonni descended from the Za and that they were vassals of Mali, rather linking them with the Zaghe kings commemorated in the funeral stelae found at Gao-Saney. He theorizes that the Zaghe, followers of Sunni Islam, became known as such, and were the Za's rivals for the throne of Gao until finally defeating them in the early 15th century.

In a similar vein, Leo Africanus wrote that the Songhay ruler 'Soni Heli' was of 'Libyan lineage', but that his black captain 'Abubacr Izchia' rebelled against Ali's sons and put them to death, and rulership thereby 'returned to the blacks.'

== Rise and Fall ==
The chronicles do not specify where the early rulers lived. As there is evidence that Gao remained under Mali control until the early fifteenth century, it is probable that the early Sunni rulers controlled a region to the south, with the town of Kukiya possibly serving as their capital. Early 15th century inscriptions from Kukiya indicate that the Sonni ruled over a thoroughly Islamic society at that time.

Under the rule of Sunni Sulayman, the Songhai captured the Mema region to the west of Lake Débo. His successor, Sunni Ali, greatly expanded the territory under Sunni control. The dynasty ended in April 1493 when Sunni Bakr Dao was defeated in battle against Askiya Muhammad I.

== Rulers according to the Tarikh al-Sudan ==
The names with their diacritics listed below are those given in the translation of the Tarikh al-Sudan from Arabic into English by John Hunwick. The surviving Arabic manuscripts differ both in the spelling and the vocalization of the names. This may be partly due to the difficulty of representing Songhay (or proto-Songhay) sounds in Arabic and perhaps also due to different Songhay dialects. Not all the names are listed in all the surviving manuscripts.

1. Sunni ʿAlī Kulun (early in the 14th century or fictional)
2. Sunni Silman Nāri (brother of ʿAlī Kulun, possibly fictional)
3. Sunni Ibrāhīm Kabay
4. Sunni ʿUthmān Kanafa
5. Sunni Bār Kayna Ankabī
6. Sunni Mūsā
7. Sunni Bukar Zunku
8. Sunni Bukar Dala Buyunbu
9. Sunni Mār Kiray
10. Sunni Muḥammad Dao
11. Sunni Muḥammad Kūkiyā
12. Sunni Muḥammad Fār
13. Sunni K.r.bīf
14. Sunni Mār Fī Kuli Jim
15. Sunni Mār Ar Kayna
16. Sunni Mār Aranda
17. Sunni Sulaymān
18. Sunni ʿAlī (ruled 1464-1492)
19. Sunni Bāru or Bukar Dāo (ruled 1492-1493)

== Rulers according to the Tarikh al-fattash ==
The names with their diacritics listed below are those given in the translation of Tarikh al-fattash from the Arabic into French by Octave Houdas.

1. Sunni Ali-Golom
2. Sunni Silman-Nâri
3. Sunni Ibrâhîm-Kabayao
4. Sunni Ousmân-Guifo
5. Sunni Mâkara-Komsoû (on throne in 1321-1322)
6. Sunni Boubakar-Katiya
7. Sunni Ankada Doukourou
8. Sunni Kimi-Yankoï-Moûssa
9. Sunni Bâro-Dal-Yomho
10. Sunni Mâdao
11. Sunni Mohammed Koûkiya
12. Sunni Mohammed-Fâri
13. Sunni Balam
14. Sunni Souleïmân-Dâma
15. Sunni Ali (ruled 1464-1492)
16. Sunni Bâro (ruled 1492-1493)

== See also ==
- Za dynasty
- Askia dynasty
- Mali Empire
- Songhai Empire
