= Gothèye =

Coordinates: 13°52′N 1°34′E

Gotheye
- Commune and village
- Interactive map of Gotheye
- Country: Niger
- Time zone: UTC+1 (WAT)

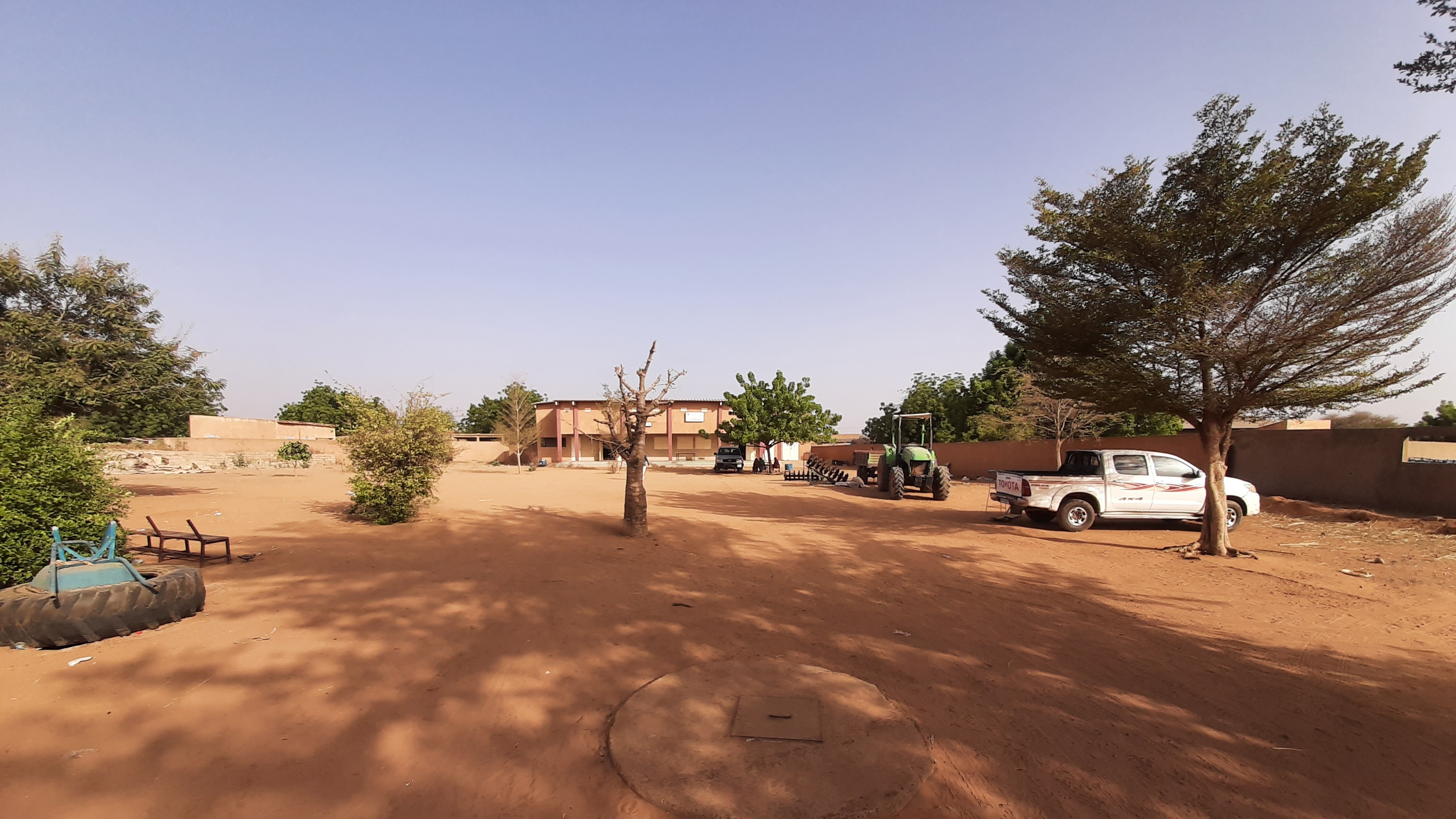
Gothèye

Gotheye is a village and rural commune in Niger. Gotheye is situated in Tillaberi, Tillabery, Niger, its geographical coordinates are 13° 51' 26" North, 1° 33' 55" East.
