= Yelou =

Coordinates: 12°15′N 3°35′E

- Commune and village
- Interactive map of Yelou
- Country: Niger
- Region: Dosso
- Department: Gaya

Population (2010)
  - Total: 61,026
- Time zone: UTC+1 (WAT)

Yelou is a village and rural commune in Niger.
