= Sonni Baru =

King of Songhai
- Reign: 6 November 1492 – 12 April 1493
- Predecessor: Sonni Ali
- Successor: Askia Mohammad (as Askiya dynasty)
- Died: Ayorou
- Religion: (Maliki) Sunni Islam some African mysticism?

Sonni Bāru, also known as Sonni Abū Bakr Dao, was the 16th and last king of the Sonni dynasty to rule over the Songhai Empire located in west Africa. His rule was very short, from 6 November 1492, to 12 April 1493. The dates of his birth and death are not known.

Bāru succeeded his father Sonni Ali on the latter's death. However, one of Sonni Ali's generals, Muhammad Ture, plotted to take power. Bāru was challenged by Ture because he was not seen as a faithful Muslim. Ture was supported by the Muslim ulama of Timbuktu, who had been harshly persecuted under Ali, and Mansa Kura, the Islamized chief of the province of Bara, north of Lake Debo. Sonni Baru drew his support from the Sohantye, the traditional religious leaders and magicians of the Songhay, and the Dendi fara, commander of an eastern province and the core of Songhai proper.

As soon as Ture had made his arrangements, he attacked Sonni Bāru on 18 February 1493. Sonni Bāru's army was defeated. There was another, more decisive battle on 12 April 1493, after which Sonni Bāru fled into exile downriver to Ayourou with his supporters. The usurper then took power as Askia Muhammad Ture.

Preceded by Sonni Ali	King of Songhai; 1492–1493	Succeeded by Askia Mohammad I
