= Namaro =

Coordinates: 13°41′N 1°43′E

- Commune and village
- Interactive map of Namaro
- Country: Niger

Area
  - Total: 388 sq mi (1,006 km^{2})

Population (2012 census)
  - Total: 55,094
  - Density: 141.8/sq mi (54.77/km^{2})
- Time zone: UTC+1 (WAT)

Namaro is a village and rural commune in Niger. As of 2012, it had a population of 55,094.

It is the birthplace of Salou Djibo, who took power in Niger in a military coup in February 2010.
