= Tarikh al-fattash =

16th-century West African chronicle

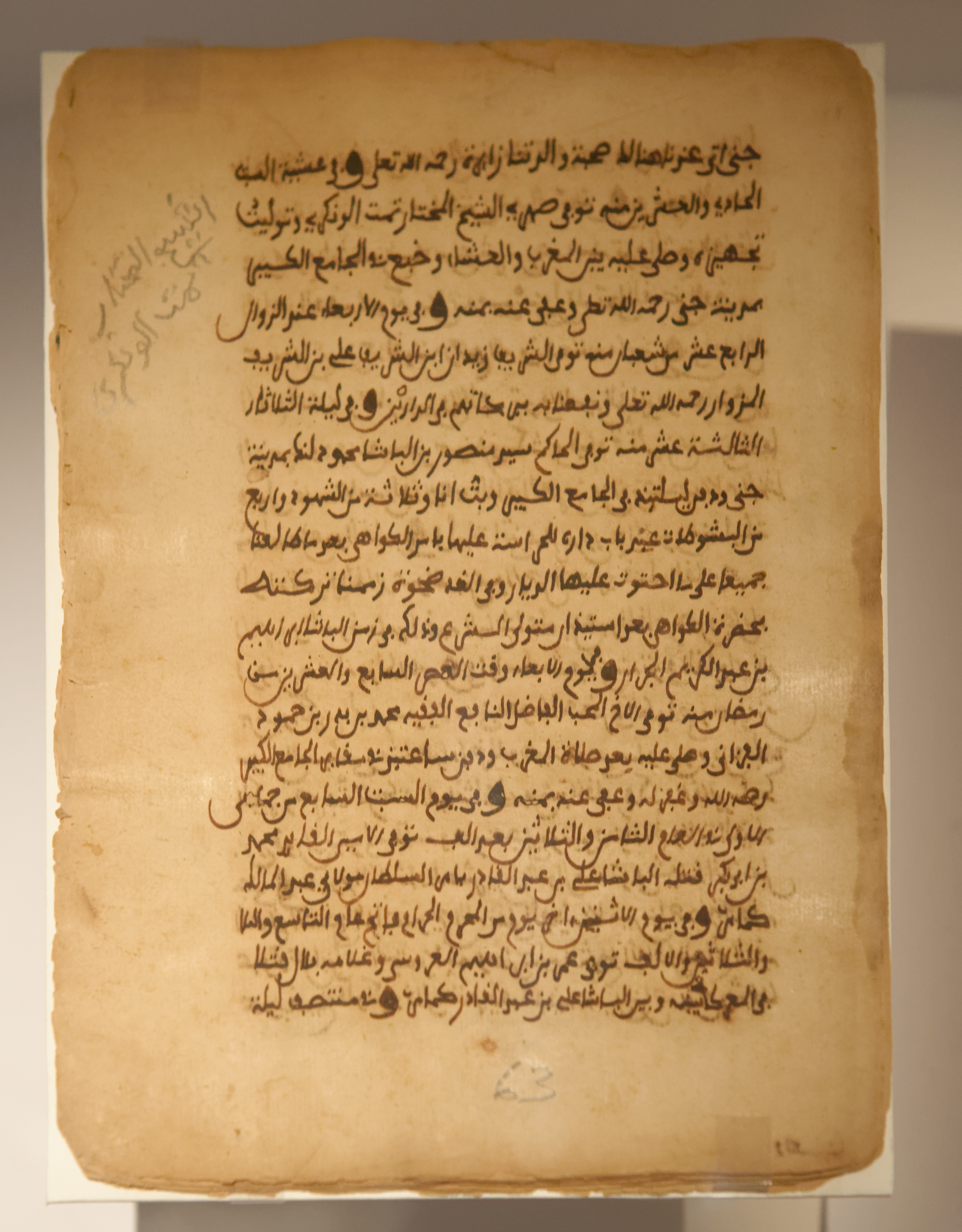
- Folio claimed to be from the Tarikh al-fattash, Mamma Haidara Memorial Library. In fact, it is a passage of the Tarikh al-Sudan.
- Also known as: Tarikh ibn al-Mukhtar
- Place of origin: Timbuktu, Macina Empire
- Language: Arabic
- Authors: Ibn al-Mukhtar; Mahmud Kati (claimed); Nūḥ b. al-Ṭāhir
- Patron: Askiya Dawud b. Harun (Tarikh ibn al-Mukhtar), Ahmad Lobbo (Tarikh al-Fattash)

The Tarikh al-fattash is a West African chronicle that provides an account of the Songhai Empire from the reign of Sunni Ali (ruled 1464-1492) up to 1599 with a few references to events in the following century. The chronicle also mentions the earlier Mali Empire. It and the Tarikh al-Sudan, a 17th century chronicle also giving a history of Songhai, are together known as the Timbuktu Chronicles.

The French scholars Octave Houdas and Maurice Delafosse published a critical edition in 1913. Since then, however, other scholars have shown that this edition in fact conflates two separate manuscripts. The first, usually referred to as Tarikh ibn al-Mukhtar, was written in the 17th century in Timbuktu by Ibn al-Mukhtar, a grandson of Mahmud Kati. The second, which bears the title Tarikh al-fattash, is a re-written forgery produced early in the 19th century by Nūḥ b. al-Ṭāhir but which claims Kati as its author.

== Discovery and publication ==
During his visit to Timbuktu in 1895 the French journalist Félix Dubois learnt of the chronicle but was unable to obtain a copy. Most copies of the manuscript had been destroyed early in the 19th century by the order of the Fula leader Seku Amadu, but in 1911 an old manuscript was located in Timbuktu that was missing some of the initial pages. A copy was made and sent to the Bibliothèque Nationale in Paris (MS No. 6651). The original Timbuktu version is designated as Manuscript A while the copy is Manuscript B. A year later a seemingly complete manuscript was located in Kayes. A copy of this manuscript, which includes the name of an author, Mahmud Kati, is designated as Manuscript C. As well as the initial chapter, Manuscript C contains various additions and deletions compared to Manuscript A.

After Octave Houdas and Maurice Delafosse had completed a translation of the Tarikh al-fattash they received a further manuscript that had been acquired by the French traveller Albert Bonnel de Mézières in Timbuktu in September 1913. The preface of this anonymous 24-page document announced that it was written at the request of Askiya Dawud b. Harun. He is known to have reigned in Timbuktu between 1657 and 1669. The text of the manuscript is closely related to the Tarikh al-fattash and presents similar material in a similar order. It includes an introduction which differs from that in Manuscript C, followed by text that is either identical to Manuscript A or is an abridged version of that contained in Manuscript A, missing many of the details.

In 1913 Houdas and Delafosse published a critical edition of the Arabic text of the Tarikh al-fattash together with a translation into French. In the volume containing the French translation they included, as Appendix 2, a translation into French of the unique portions of the 24 page manuscript. However, the corresponding Arabic text was not included in the volume containing the Arabic text of the other manuscripts.

== Textual criticism and reinterpretation ==
There are some obvious problems with the text published by Houdas and Delafosse. The biographical information for Mahmud Kati (in Manuscript C only) suggests that he was born in 1468, while the other important 17th century chronicle, the Tarikh al-Sudan, gives the year of his death (or someone with the same name) as 1593. This would correspond to an age of 125 years. In addition, there are prophecies made in the initial chapter (Manuscript C only) concerning the coming of the last of the twelve caliphs predicted by Muhammad. He will be Ahmad of the (Fulani) Sangare tribe in Massina. Seku Amadu belonged to this tribe and thus the prophecy was fulfilled.

In 1971 the historian Nehemia Levtzion published an article in which he argued that Manuscript C was a forgery produced during the time of Seku Amadu in the first quarter of the 19th century. He suggested that the real author of the manuscript (Manuscript A) was Ibn al-Mukhtar, a grandson of Mahmud Kati and that the chronicle was probably written soon after 1664.

Levtzion also suggested that the text included as Appendix 2 of the French translation might correspond to an earlier version of Manuscript A, before the manuscript was expanded by members of the Kati family. Unfortunately the modern study of the Tarikh al-fattash is handicapped by the disappearance of the Arabic manuscript corresponding to Appendix 2 of the French translation.

In 2015 based upon analysis of other manuscripts not explored by previous researchers and rediscovery of Manuscript A, Mauro Nobili and Mohamed Shahid Mathee argued that the work published by Houdas and Delafosse is in fact a conflation of two separate works. They name the first one Tarikh Ibn al-Mukhtar, it being the chronicle written by Ibn al-Mukhtar. The second one, the actual Tarikh al-fattash, corresponds to Appendix 2 of Houdas' and Delafosse's Chronique de Chercheur (sometimes referred to as the Notice Historique) plus the text of MS A and MS B used by Houdas and Delafosse. It consists of an edited copy of the Tarikh Ibn al-Mukhtar. Nobili and Mathee argue that the emendations made by Nūḥ b. al-Ṭāhir to the original text are extensive enough to make it a separate document, written with a very different ideological project in mind, and the document's supposed authorship by Mahmud Kati is an invention. This reinterpretation has become widely accepted among historians of West Africa, although its impact on existing understandings of history is still being debated.

== Sources ==
- de Moraes Farias, Paulo Fernando (2008). "Intellectual innovation and reinvention of the Sahel: the seventeenth-century Timbuktu chronicles". In Shamil, Jeppie; Diagne, Suleymane Bachir (eds.). The Meanings of Timbuktu. Cape Town: Human Sciences Research Council Press. pp. 95–107. ISBN 978-0-7969-2204-5.
- Dubois, Felix (1896). Timbuctoo the mysterious. White, Diana (trans.). New York: Longmans.
- Hale, Thomas A. (2007). Griots and Griottes: Masters of Words and Music. Indiana University Press. ISBN 9780253219619.
- Houdas, Octave; Delafosse, Maurice, eds. (1913). Tarikh el-fettach par Mahmoūd Kāti et l'un de ses petit fils (2 Vols.). Paris: Ernest Leroux. Volume 1 is the Arabic text, Volume 2 is a translation into French. Reprinted by Maisonneuve in 1964 and 1981. The French text is also available from Aluka but requires a subscription.
- Levtzion, Nehemia (1971). "A seventeenth-century chronicle by Ibn al-Mukhtār: A critical study of "Ta'rīkh al-fattāsh"" (PDF). Bulletin of the School of Oriental and African Studies. 34 (3): 571–593. doi:10.1017/s0041977x00128551. JSTOR 613903. S2CID 163071268. Archived from the original on July 28, 2011.
- Nobili, Mauro (2018). "New reinventions of the Sahel: reflections on the tārikh genre in the Timbuktu historiographical production, seventeenth to twentieth centuries". In Green, Toby; Rossi, Benedetta (eds.). Landscapes, Sources and Intellectual Projects of the West African Past: Essays in Honour of Paulo Fernando de Moraes Farias. BRILL. ISBN 978-90-04-38018-9.
- Nobili, Mauro; Mathee, Mohamed Shahid (2015). "Towards a new study of the so-called Tārīkh al-fattāsh". History in Africa. 42: 37–73. doi:10.1017/hia.2015.18. S2CID 163126332.
