= Bana, Niger =

Coordinates: 12°03′02″N 3°33′11″E

- Commune and village
- Interactive map of Bana, Niger
- Country: Niger
- Region: Dosso
- Department: Gaya
- Elevation: 577 ft (176 m)

Population (2010)
  - Total: 17,830
- Time zone: UTC+1 (WAT)

Bana, Niger is a village and rural commune in Niger.
