= Bengou =

Coordinates: 11°59′N 3°35′E

- Commune and village
- Interactive map of Bengou
- Country: Niger
- Elevation: 571 ft (174 m)

Population (2012)
  - Total: 13,452
- Time zone: UTC+1 (WAT)

Bengou is a village and rural commune in Niger. The elevation in Bengou is 571 ft (174m). A 2012 census reports the Bengou population at 13,452.
