= Tanda, Niger =

Coordinates: 11°59′N 3°19′E

- Commune and village
- Interactive map of Tanda, Niger
- Country: Niger
- Time zone: UTC+1 (WAT)

Tanda, Niger is a village and rural commune in Niger.
