= Sonni Ali =

First king of the Songhai Empire

King of Songhai
- Reign: 1464 – November 6, 1492
- Successor: Sunni Baru

Sunni dynasty
- Reign: 1464 – 1492
- Predecessor: Sunni Suleiman
- Successor: Sunni Baru
- Died: 1492
- Father: Sonni Muhammad Da'o
- Religion: Islam

Sonni Ali, also known as Si Ali, Sonni Ali Ber (Ber meaning "the Great"), reigned from about 1464 to 1492 as the 15th ruler of the Sunni dynasty of the Songhai Empire. He transformed the relatively small state into an empire by conquering Timbuktu, Massina, the Inner Niger Delta, and Djenne.

== Early life ==
Sunni Ali was born the son of Sonni Muhammad Da'o, who appears in the kinglists of the Tarikh al-Sudan and Tarikh al-Fattash as the 10th Sonni ruler. His mother was from Fara, an area that was still heavily pagan, and Ali was raised in this milieu. As a Sonni, he also received an Islamic education, but practiced a syncretic, unorthodox faith.

== Reign ==
Upon Sunni Ali's accession, the Songhay already controlled the Niger river basin from Dendi to Mema. His first major conquest was the ancient city of Timbuktu. Controlled by the Tuaregs since the Malian retreat a few decades earlier, in 1469 the Timbuktu-koi 'Umar asked for Songhai protection. He conducted a repressive policy against the scholars of Timbuktu who he saw as associated with the Tuareg.

Sunni Ali organized a powerful fleet on the Niger river, and in 1473 used it to lay siege to Djenne, which surrendered only after being reduced to starvation. In order to bring his fleet to bear in an attempt to conquer Walata, he tried to dig a canal hundreds of kilometers to the town from Ras el Ma. In 1483 he had to abandon this project, however, to defeat an invasion by the Mossi people. He also conquered the lands of the Sanhaja called Nunu. He conquered the lands of Kunta and was determined to seize the lands of Borgu but was unable to.

=== Domestic policies ===
In addition to external enemies, Sunni Ali fought campaigns against the Fulani of Massina and other nomadic peoples raiding within his borders. His main capital was Gao, but he was also based at Kukiya, Kabara, and Tindirma at different times depending on where he was campaigning. Sunni Ali ruled over both urban Muslims and rural non-Muslims at a time when the traditional co-existence of different beliefs was being challenged. His adherence to African animism while also professing Islam leads some writers to describe him as outwardly or nominally Muslim. However, he did observe the Islamic prayers, fasted and gave alms. Toby Green notes that, he did not "permit the acceptance of Sharī’a in Songhay, and he saw no barrier to enslaving Muslims." That none of this prevented the Songhay empire expanding so rapidly under his leadership therefore posed a serious ideological and political challenge to the scholars of Timbuktu, who reacted with concomitant fury in their texts regarding him. As Al-Maghīlī put it, “he used to worship idols, believe in the soothsayers’ [pronouncements], seek help from magicians, and venerate certain trees and stones by slaughtering at them and by giving alms.”

However, Toby Green further notes that "Sonni Ali’s relationship with the Muslim clerics was not quite so brutal as this picture portrays," where even Al-Sa’dī recognised that “despite his bad treatment of the scholars, Sunni ‘Ali acknowledged their worth, and showed kindness and respect to some of them. He would say, ‘were it not for the scholars, life would not be so pleasant or agreeable.” Furthermore, funeral stelae from Kukiya, however, cast some doubt on the chroniclers criticism of Sunni Ali, as they were writing on behalf of the Askias who had overthrown the Sunni dynasty.

== Death and succession ==
His death, on November 6, 1492, is a matter of conjecture. According to the Tarikh al-Sudan, Ali drowned in a boating accident while crossing the Niger River. Oral tradition believes he was killed by his sister's son, Askia Muhammad Ture. Sonni Ali's son, Sunni Baru, was immediately proclaimed king of Songhay by the army commanders, but he was challenged by Askia because Baru was not seen as a faithful Muslim. Askia eventually defeated Sunni Baru and took power.

Preceded by Silman Dandi	King of Songhai; 1464–1492	Succeeded by Sonni Baru
