= Tarikh al-Sudan =

1655 West African text

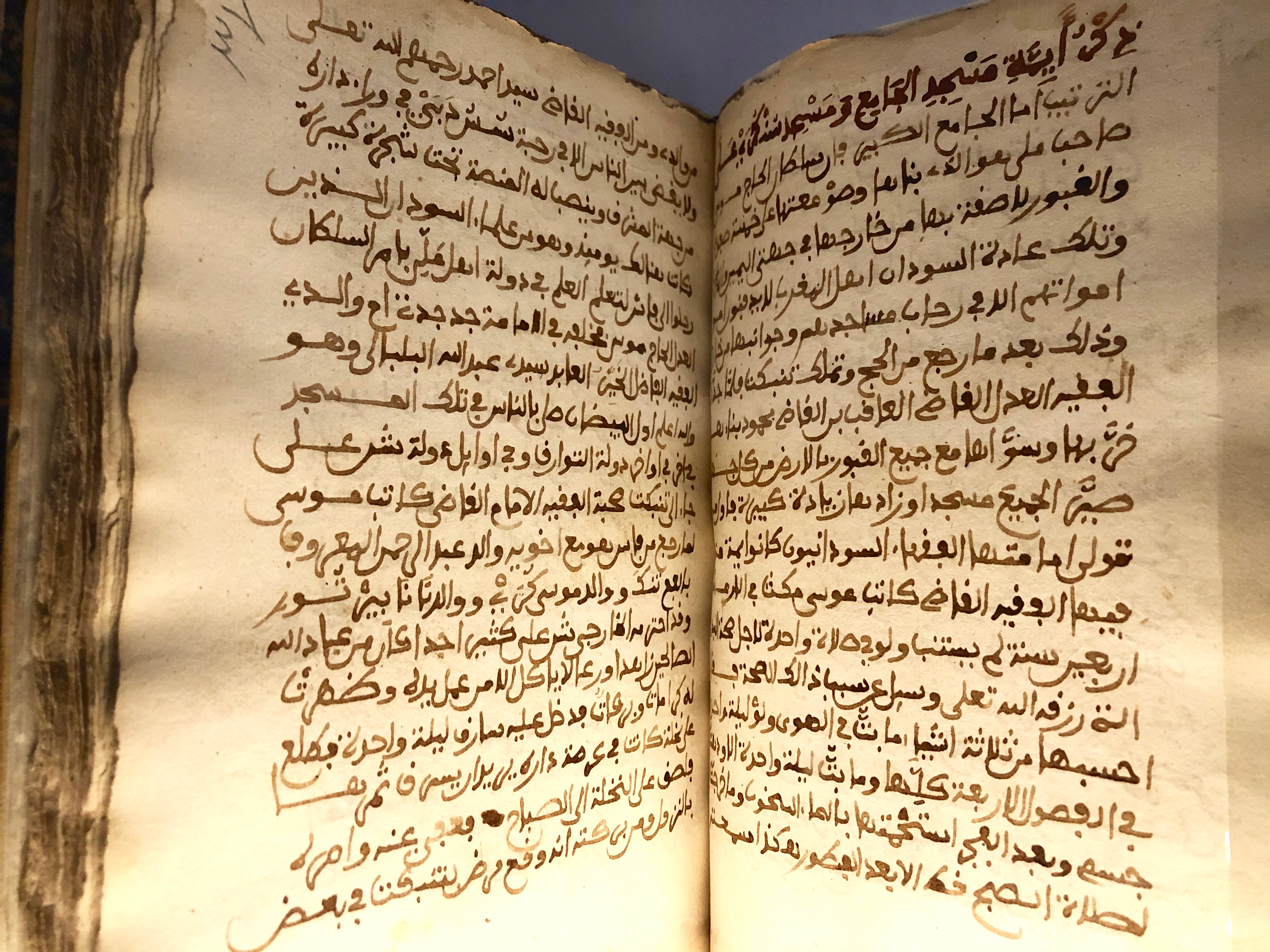
Folio of a manuscript version preserved at the Bibliothèque nationale de France

The Tarikh al-Sudan (Arabic: تاريخ السودان Tārīkh as-Sūdān; also Tarikh es-Sudan, "History of the Sudan") is a West African chronicle written in Arabic in around 1655 by the chronicler of Timbuktu, al-Sa'di. It provides the single most important primary source for the history of the Songhai Empire. It and the Tarikh al-fattash, another 17th century chronicle giving a history of Songhay, are together known as the Timbuktu Chronicles.

The author, Abderrahmane al-Sa'di, was born on 28 May 1594, and died at an unknown date sometime after 1655-56, the last date to be mentioned in his chronicle. He spent most of his life working for the Moroccan Arma bureaucracy, initially in the administration of Djenné and the massina region of the Inland Niger Delta. In 1646 he became chief secretary to the Arma administration of Timbuktu.

The early sections of the chronicle are devoted to brief histories of earlier Songhay dynasties, of the Mali Empire and of the Tuareg, and to biographies of the scholars and holymen of both Timbuktu and Djenné. The main part of the chronicle covers the history of the Songhai from the middle of the 15th century till the Moroccan invasion in 1591, and then the history of Timbuktu under Moroccan rule up to 1655. Al-Sadi rarely acknowledges his sources. For the earlier period much of his information is presumably based on oral tradition. From around 1610 the information would have been gained first hand.

== Publication ==
In 1853 the German scholar and explorer Heinrich Barth visited Timbuktu on behalf of the British government. During his stay in Gwandu (now in northwest Nigeria) he consulted a copy of the Tarikh al-Sudan in his investigation of the history of the Songhay empire. However he was under the misapprehension that the author was the Timbuktu scholar Ahmed Baba. In his book Barth wrote:

But I myself was so successful as to have an opportunity of perusing a complete history of the kingdom of Songhay, from the very dawn of historical records down to the year 1640 of our era; although, unfortunately, circumstances prevented my bringing back a complete copy of this manuscript, which forms a respectable quarto volume, and I was only able, during the few days that I had this manuscript in my hands during my stay in Gandó, to make short extracts of those passages from its contents which I thought of the highest interest in an historical and geographical point of view.
These annals, according to the universal statement of the learned people of Negroland, were written by a distinguished person of the name of A'hmed Baba, although in the work itself that individual is only spoken of in the third person; and it would seem that additions had been made to the book by another hand; but on this point I can not speak with certainty, as I had not sufficient time to read over the latter portion of the work with the necessary attention and care.

Forty years later the French journalist Félix Dubois in his Timbuctoo the Mysterious pointed out that the Tarikh could not have been written by Ahmed Baba as it mentions Ahmed Baba's death. "How could a man so well informed in Arabian subjects be so completely deceived? ... If he had read the entire book with more attention, he would have seen that the date – year, month and day – of Ahmed Baba's death is mentioned by the author ...". Dubois realized that the manuscript was by Abd al-Sadi.

After the French occupation of Mali in the 1890s, two copies of the manuscript were acquired by the Bibliothèque Nationale in Paris. These were studied by the Arabic scholar Octave Houdas. The undated Manuscript A had been sent by Louis Archinard, Manuscript B was a copy made for Félix Dubois while in Djenné in 1895 and was very similar to Manuscript A. A third copy of the Tarikh al-Sudan, Manuscript C, was sent to Houdas by the linguist René Basset who was head of the École Supérieure des Lettres in Algiers. Manuscript C was generally superior to the other two and included vowels for many of the proper names and the date of 1792 for when the copy had been made. Houdas published the Arabic text in 1898 and a translation into French in 1900. A century later John Hunwick published a partial translation into English.

== Manuscripts ==
Manuscripts A, B and C were used by Houdas. A further four were listed by Hunwick. The text of the manuscripts are all very similar. The differences are mainly in the spelling of places and personal names.

Manuscript	Location	Reference
A	Bibliothèque nationale de France, Paris	Arabe 5147
B	Bibliothèque nationale de France, Paris	Arabe 5256
C	Bibliothèque nationale de France, Paris	Arabes 6096
D	Bibliothèque de l'Institut de France, Paris	MS 2414 (Fonds De Gironcourt 200)
E	Bibliothèque Nationale, Algiers	Fonds Ben Hamouda, MS 4
F	Ahmed Baba Institute, Timbuktu	MS 660
G	Ahmed Baba Institute, Timbuktu	MS 681

== Origin of the Kingdom of Mali ==
The Berber author of Ta'rikh al-Sudan, Abd al-Rahman al-Sa'di, recorded the oral tradition surrounding the origin of the Ghana empire and Mali. He states, "Mali is the name of an extensive territory lying in the far west (of the Sudan) to the direction of the Ocean. It was Kaya-Magha who founded the first kingdom in that region. His capital was Ghana, an important town in the country of Baghana. It is said that their kingdom was in existence before the hijra, and that twenty-two kings reigned before it and twenty-two afterwards, making forty four in all. In origin they were white, though we do not know to whom they trace their origin. Their subjects, however, were Wa'kore (Soninke). When their kingdom came to an end, the people of Mali succeeded to hegemony."
