= Tindirma =

Coordinates: 16°08′N 3°38′W

- Commune and village
- Interactive map of Tindirma
- Country: Mali
- Region: Tombouctou Region
- Cercle: Diré Cercle

Population (1998)
  - Total: 3,419
- Time zone: UTC+0 (GMT)
- Climate: BWh

Tindirma is a village and commune of the Cercle of Diré in the Tombouctou Region of Mali. As of 1998 the commune had a population of 3,419.

== History ==
Established in 1496, Tindirma was once a Jewish community founded by Iberian Sephardi Jews who had been expelled from Spain and Portugal. Jewish graves and structures still remain in Tindirma. Tindirma quickly became an important trade and administrative town within the Songhai Empire, becoming the capital of the western provinces and the seat of the powerful Kurmina-fari. The town was destroyed by Askia Ishaq II in 1588 after a rebellion.

In 1963, the ethnic consciousness of Jewish descendants living in Tindirma was revived after local fishermen wanted to build a village on top of the remains of Al Yahudi Cemetery, causing local Jews to rise up in strong opposition.

== See also ==
- Jews of Bilad el-Sudan
