= Songhai people =

Ethno-linguistic group of West Africa

Songhai
Soŋay, Ayneha
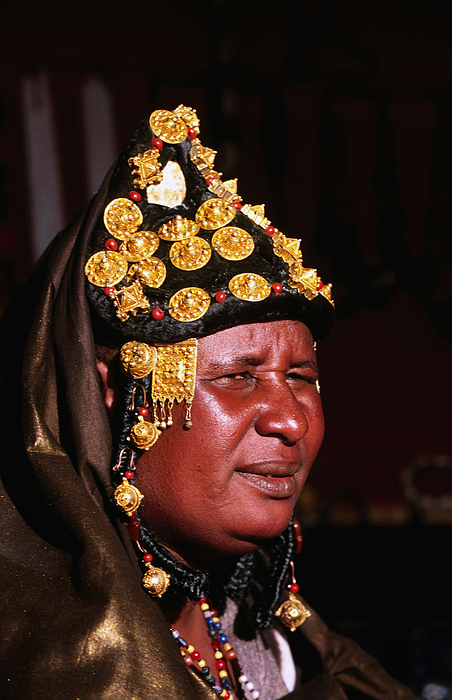
- Songhai woman at a festival

Total population
- c. 8.4 million

Regions with significant populations
- West Africa
- Niger: 5,106,423 (21.2%)
- Mali: 1,984,114 (5.9%)
- Benin: 406,000 (2.9%)
- Burkina Faso: 241,000 (1.04%)
- Nigeria: 165,000 (0.04%)
- Ghana: 110,000 (2.0%)
- Algeria: 3,000 (0.01%)

Languages
- Songhay languages, French, English, Arabic

Religion
- Sunni Islam

Related ethnic groups
- Zarma, Tubu, Kanuri, other Nilo-Saharan groups

The Songhai people (autonym: Ayneha) are an ethnolinguistic group in West Africa who speak the various Songhai languages. Their history and lingua franca is linked to the Songhai Empire, which dominated the western Sahel in the 15th and 16th centuries. Predominantly adherents of Islam, the Songhai are primarily located in Niger and Mali. Historically, the term "Songhai" did not denote an ethnic or linguistic identity but referred to the ruling caste of the Songhay Empire known as the Songhaiborai. The term used by the natives to refer to this group of people collectively is "Ayneha".

Although some speakers in Mali have also adopted the name Songhay as an ethnic designation, other Songhay-speaking groups identify themselves by other ethnic terms, such as Zarma (or Djerma, the largest subgroup) or Isawaghen. The dialect of Koyraboro Senni spoken in Gao is unintelligible to speakers of the Zarma dialect of Niger, according to at least one report. The Songhay languages are commonly taken to be Nilo-Saharan but this classification remains controversial: Dimmendaal (2008) believes that for now it is best considered an independent language family.

== Ethnonyms ==
Alternative spellings: Songai, Songay, Songhay, Songhay, Songhoi, Songhoy, Songhrai, Songhray, Songoi, Sonhrai, Sonhray, Sonrai, Sonray, Sonrhai, Sonrhay.

The correct pronunciation of "Songhai" in the Songhai languages is "Soŋay", with the "ŋ" representing a velar nasal sound (the "ng" sound is produced by raising the back of the tongue to the soft part of the roof of the mouth, creating a resonant nasal sound). The term "Sonrai" is a result of French influence, stemming from their difficulty in pronouncing the original word accurately.

However, Songhai people collectively identify themselves as "Ayneha", meaning "I speak", and the Songhai (Songhaiborai) are a subgroup within the Ayneha. This distinct self-reference contrasts with the prevalent classification often encountered in Western literature. It may have been influenced by the Songhai word's popularity, given that the Songhai Empire was named after the ruling caste, the Songhaiborai, which is a subgroup within the broader ethnic Ayneha community.

== Sub-groups ==
- Zarma people
- Songhaiborai
- Dendi people
- Wogo people
- Kurtey people
- Igdalen people
- Ingalkoyyu people
- Arma people
- Zabarmawi (Sudan)
- Belbali people
- Idaksahak people

== History ==
=== Za dynasty ===
The Za dynasty or Zuwa dynasty were rulers of a medieval kingdom based in the towns of Kukiya and Gao on the Niger River in what is today modern Mali. The Songhai people at large all descended from this kingdom. The most notable of them being the Zarma subgroup who derive their name "Zarma (Za Hama)" from this dynasty, which means "the descendants of Za".

Al-Sadi's seventeenth century chronicle, the Tarikh al-Sudan, provides an early history of the Songhay as handed down by oral tradition. The chronicle reports that the legendary founder of the dynasty, Za Alayaman (also called Dialliaman), originally came from the Yemen and settled in the town of Kukiya. The town is believed to have been near the modern village of Bentiya on the eastern bank of the Niger River, north of the Fafa rapids, 134 km south east of Gao. Tombstones with Arabic inscriptions dating from the 14th and 15th centuries have been found in the area.

Kukiya is also mentioned in the other important chronicle, the Tarikh al-fattash. The Tarikh al-Sudan relates that the 15th ruler, Za Kusoy, converted to Islam in the year 1009–1010 A.D. At some stage the kingdom or at least its political focus moved north to Gao. The kingdom of Gao capitalized on the growing trans-Saharan trade and grew into a small regional power before being conquered by the Mali Empire in the early 13th century.

=== Gao Empire and Gao-Saney ===
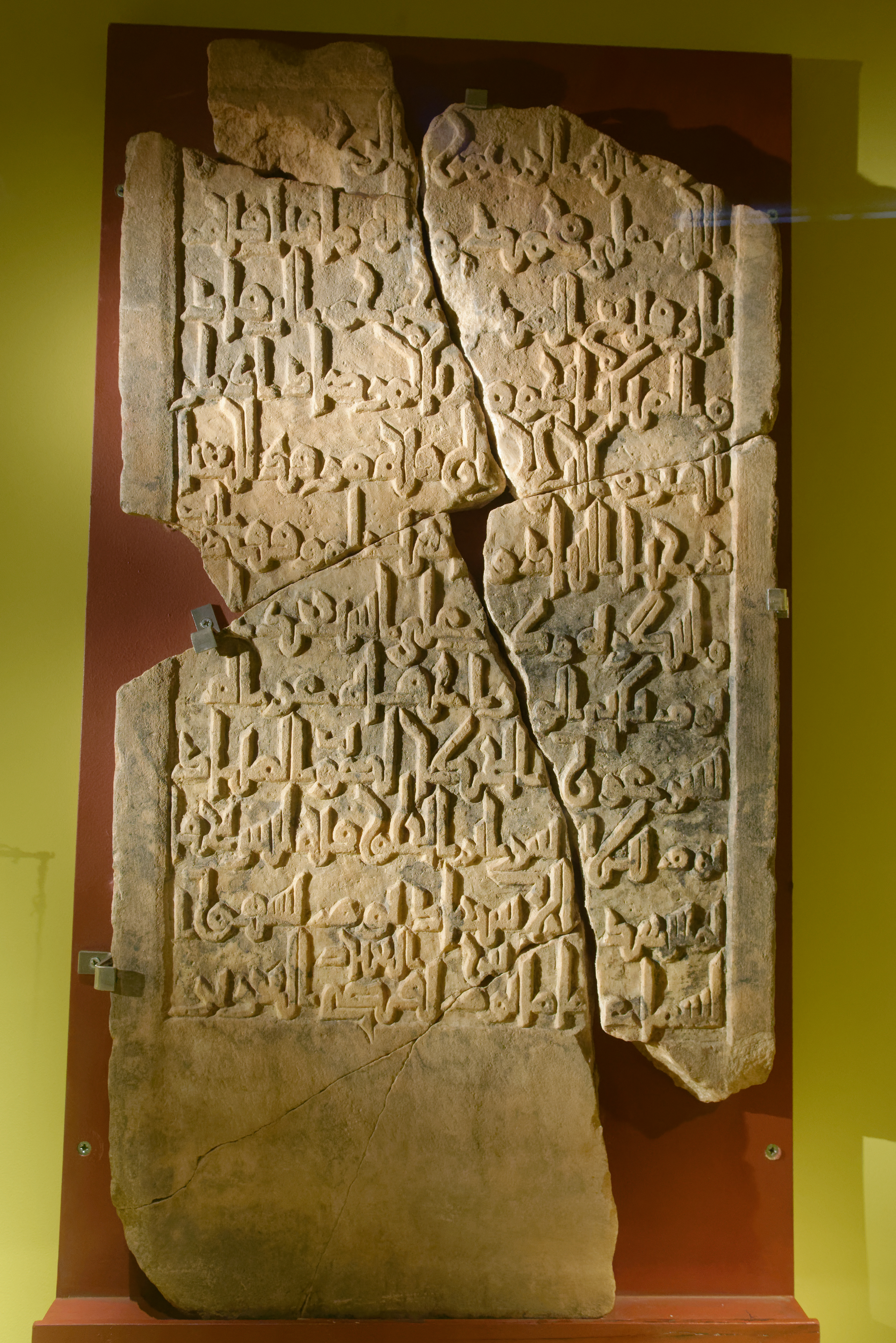
A stele found in Gao-Saney, now in the National Museum of Mali

Gao-Saney became well known among African historians because French administrators discovered here in a cave covered with sand in 1939 several finely carved marble stelae produced in Almeria in Southern Spain. Their inscriptions bear witness of three kings of a Muslim dynasty bearing as loan names the names of Muhammad and his two successors. From the dates of their deaths it appears that these kings of Gao ruled at the end of the eleventh and the beginning of the twelfth centuries CE.

According to recent research, the Zaghe kings commemorated by the stelae are identical with the kings of the Za dynasty whose names were recorded by the chroniclers of Timbuktu in the Ta'rikh al-Sudan and in the Ta'rikh al-Fattash. Their Islamic loan name is in one case complemented by their African name. It is on the basis of their common ancestral name Zaghe corresponding to Za and the third royal name Yama b. Kama provided in addition to 'Umar b. al-Khattab that the identity between the Zaghe and the Za could be established.

Kings of Gao-Saney (1100 to 1120 CE)
| Stelae of Gao-Saney | | Ta'rīkh al-fattāsh | Ta'rīkh al-sūdān |
| Kings of the Zāghē | Date of death | Kings of the Zā | Kings of the Zā |
| Abū 'Abd Allāh Muhammad st. 1100 | st. 1100 | (16) Kotso-Dare | (16) Kusoy-Dare |
| Abū Bakr b. Quhāfa st. 1110 | st. 1110 | (17) Hizka-Zunku-Dam | (17) Hunabonua-Kodam |
| Umar b. al-Khattāb = |

It appears from this table that Yama b. Kima (or 'Umar b. al-Khattab), the third king of the stelae of Gao-Saney, is identical with the 18th ruler of the list of Za kings. His name is given in the Ta'rikh al-Fattash (1665) as Yama-Kitsi and in the Ta'rikh al-Sudan (1655) as Biyu-Ki-Kima. On account of this identification the dynastic history of the Gao Empire can now be established on a solid documentary basis. Apart from some Arabic epitaphs on tombstones discovered in 1939 at the cemetery of Gao-Saney (6 km to the east of the city) there are no surviving indigenous written records that date from before the middle of the 17th century.

Our knowledge of the early history of the town relies on the writings of external Arabic geographers living in Morocco, Egypt and Andalusia, who never visited the region. These authors referred to the town as Kawkaw or Kuku. The two key 17th century chronicles, the Tarikh al-Sudan and the Tarikh al-Fattash, provide information on the town at the time of the Songhai Empire but they contain only vague indications on the time before.

The chronicles do not, in general, acknowledge their sources. Their accounts for the earlier periods are almost certainly based on oral tradition and for events before the second half of the 15th century they are likely to be less reliable. For these earlier periods the two chronicles sometimes provide conflicting information. The earliest mention of Gao is by al-Khwārizmī who wrote in the first half of the 9th century. In the 9th century Gao was already an important regional power. Al-Yaqubi wrote in his Tarikh in around 872:

There is the kingdom of the Kawkaw, which is the greatest of the realms of the Sūdān, the most important and most powerful. All the kingdoms obey its king. Al-Kawkaw is the name of the town. Besides this there are a number of kingdoms of which the rulers pay allegiance to him and acknowledge his sovereignty, although they are kings in their own lands.

In the 10th century, Gao was already Muslim and was described as consisting of two separate towns. Al-Muhallabi, who died in 990, wrote in a lost work quoted in the biographical dictionary compiled by Yaqut:

Their king pretends before his subject to be a Muslim and most of them pretend to be Muslims too. He has a town on the Nile [Niger], on the eastern bank, which is called Sarnāh, where there are markets and trading houses and to which there is continuous traffic from all parts. He has another town to the west of the Nile [Niger] where he and his men and those who have his confidence live. There is a mosque there where he prays but the communal prayer ground is between the two towns.

The archaeological evidence suggests that there were two settlements on the eastern bank of the Niger: Gao Ancien situated within the modern town, to the east of the Tomb of Askia, and the archaeological site of Gao-Saney (Sané in French) situated around 4 km to the east. The bed of the Wadi Gangaber passes to the south of the Gao-Saney occupation mound (tell) but to the north of Gao Ancien. The imported pottery and glass recovered from Gao-Saney suggest that the site was occupied between the 8th and 12th centuries.

It is possible that Gao-Saney corresponds to Sarnāh of al-Muhallabi. Al-Bakri writing in 1068 also records the existence of two towns, but al-Idrisi writing in around 1154 does not. Both al-Muhallabi (see quote above) and al-Bakri situate Gao on the west (or right bank) of the Niger. The 17th century Tarikh al-Fattash also states that in the 10th century Gao was situated on the Gourma side (i.e. the west bank) of the river. A large sand dune, La Dune Rose, lies on the west bank opposite Gao, but at Koima, on the edge of the dune at a site 4 km north of Gao, surface deposits indicate a pre 9th century settlement. This could be the west bank Gao mentioned by 10th and 11th century authors. The site has not been excavated.

Al-Sadi in his Tarikh al-Sudan gives a slightly later date for the introduction of Islam. He lists 32 rulers of the Zuwa dynasty and states that in 1009–1010 A.D. the 15th ruler, Zuwa Kusoy, was the first to convert to Islam.

Towards the end of the 13th century, Gao lost its independence and became part of the expanding Mali Empire. What happened to the Zuwa rulers is not recorded. Ibn Battuta visited Gao in 1353 when the town formed part of the Mali Empire. He arrived by boat from Timbuktu on his return journey from visiting the capital of the Empire:

Then I travelled to the town of Kawkaw, which is a great town on the Nīl [Niger], one of the finest, biggest, and most fertile cities of the Sūdān. There is much rice there, and milk, and chickens, and fish, and the cucumber, which has no like. Its people conduct their buying and selling with cowries, like the people of Mālī.

After staying a month in the town, Ibn Battuta left with a caravan for Takedda and from there headed north back across the Sahara to an oasis in Tuat with a large caravan that included 600 slave girls.

Sometime in the 14th century, Ali Kulun, the first ruler of the Sunni dynasty, rebelled against Mali hegemony, and was defeated.; It was not until the first half of the 15th century that Sunni Sulayman Dama was able to throw off the Mali yoke. His successor, Sunni Ali Ber (1464–1492), greatly expanded the territory under Songhay control and established the Songhay Empire.

=== Under Mali Empire ===
Towards the end of the 13th century, Gao lost its independence and became part of the expanding Mali Empire.

According to the Tarikh al-Sudan, the cities of Gao and Timbuktu submitted to Musa's rule as he traveled through on his return to Mali. According to one account given by Ibn Khaldun, Musa's general Saghmanja conquered Gao. The other account claims that Gao had been conquered during the reign of Mansa Sakura. Both of these accounts may be true, as Mali's control of Gao may have been weak, requiring powerful mansas to reassert their authority periodically. Both chronicles provide details on Ali Kulun (or Ali Golom) the founder of the Sunni dynasty. He revolted against the hegemony of the Mali Empire. A date is not given in the chronicles but the comment in the Tarikh al-fattash that the fifth ruler was in power at time when Mansa Musa made his pilgrimage suggests that Ali Kulun reigned around the end of the 14th century.

Both chronicles associate Ali Kulun (or Ali Golom) with the Mali court. The Tarikh al-Sudan relates that his father was Za Yasoboy, and as a son of a subordinate ruler of the Mali Empire, he had to serve the sultan of Mali.

The chronicles do not specify where the early rulers lived. As there is evidence that Gao remained under Mali control until the early fifteenth century, it is probably that the early Sunni rulers controlled a region to the south, with the town of Kukiya possibly serving as their capital. As the economic strength of Mali Empire relied on controlling routes across the Sahara, it would not have been necessary to control the area to the south of Gao.

Al-Sadi, the author of the Tarikh al-Sudan uses the word Sunni or Sonni for the name of the dynasty while the Tarikh al-fattash uses the forms chi and si'i. The word may have a Malinke origin meaning "a subordinate or confidant of the ruler".

Under the rule of Sunni Sulayman, the Songhai captured the Mema region to the west of Lake Débo.

=== Songhai Empire ===
Formerly one of the peoples subjected by the Mali Empire, the Songhai were able to reassert their control of the area around Gao after the weakening of the Mali Empire, founding the Songhai Empire which came to encompass much of the former Malian territories, including Timbuktu, famous for its Islamic universities, and the pivotal trading city of Djenné, and extending their rule over a territory that surpassed the former Mali and Ghana empires.

Among Songhai's most noted scholars was Ahmed Baba— a highly distinguished historian frequently quoted in the Tarikh al-Sudan and other works. The people consisted of mostly fishermen and traders. Following Sonni Ali's death, Muslim factions rebelled against his successor and installed Sonni Ali nephew, Askia Muhammad (formerly Muhammad Toure) who was to be the first and most important ruler of the Askia dynasty (1492–1592). Under the Askias, the Songhai empire reached its zenith.

Following Askia Muhammad, the empire began to collapse. It was enormous and could not be kept under control. The Saadi Sultante saw Songhay's still flourishing salt and gold trade and decided that it would be a good asset, proceeding to conquer much of the region after the Battle of Tondibi.

=== Songhai Empire Decline ===
In 1528, Askia faced a rebellion led by his own children, resulting in the proclamation of his son Musa as king. However, Musa's reign was short-lived as he was overthrown in 1531, leading to a period of decline for the Songhai Empire.

Amidst the internal strife and numerous civil wars plaguing the empire, the Saadians surprisingly launched an invasion of the Songhai Empire. The primary motive behind this invasion was the desire to control and rejuvenate trans-Saharan trade, particularly in salt and gold. Despite Askia's rule, the Songhai military remained traditional, composed of full-time soldiers, without modernization. In stark contrast, the invading Saadian force boasted thousands of arquebusiers and eight English cannons.

The pivotal Battle of Tondibi on March 13, 1591, saw the Moroccans decisively defeating the Songhai army. Subsequently, they captured Gao and Timbuktu, marking the ultimate demise of the once-mighty Songhai Empire.

After the empire's defeat, the nobles moved south to an area known today as Songhai in present Niger, where the Sonni dynasty had already settled. They formed smaller kingdoms such as Wanzarbe, Ayerou, Gothèye, Dargol, Téra, Sikié, Kokorou, Gorouol, Karma, Namaro, etc. and further south, the Dendi which rose to prominence shortly afterward.

=== Kingdom of Dendi ===
Under the Songhai Empire, Dendi had been the easternmost province, governed by the prestigious Dendi-fari ("governor of the eastern front"). Some members of the Askia dynasty and their followers fled here after being defeated by the invading Saadi dynasty at the Battle of Tondibi and at another battle seven months later. There, they resisted Saadians Invaders and maintained the tradition of the Songhai with the same Askia rulers and their newly established capital at Lulami.

The first ruler, Askia Ishaq II was deposed by his brother Muhammad Gao, who was murdered on the order of the Saadians pasha. The Moroccans then appointed Sulayman as puppet king ruling the Niger between Djenné and Gao. South of Tillaberi, the Songhai resistance against the Saadians continued under Askia Nuh, a son of Askia Dawud. He established his capital at Lulami.

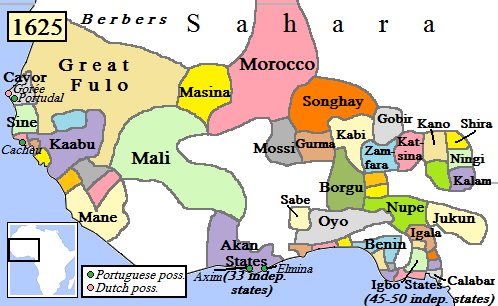
West Africa in 1625 after the Saadians invasion

=== Arma Pashalik of Timbuktu ===
Following the Saadians army's triumph at Battle of Tondibi and the subsequent capture of Gao, Timbuktu, and Djenné, the Pashalik of Timbuktu was established, designating Timbuktu as its capital. Commencing in 1618, the Pasha, initially appointed by the Saadi Sultan, transitioned to being elected by the Arma.

Despite governing the Pashalik as an independent republic, the Armas continued to acknowledge Saadian sultans as their leaders. During the civil war following Ahmad al-Mansur's death, the Pashalik supported the legitimate Sultan, Zidan al-Nasir, and by 1670, they pledged allegiance to the Alaouite sultans. and in 1670, they recognized the Alaouites and pledged allegiance.

This allegiance was short-lived. By the early eighteenth century, the Pashalik revoked Saadian suzerainty. Local traditions attribute this event to Gurdu, a learned scholar believed to have supernatural powers. According to tradition, Gurdu halted slavery by sending his youngest student to sign a document, prohibiting the annual exchange of slaves from Timbuktu.

By the mid-eighteenth century, the pashalik was declining. Around 1770, the Tuareg seized Gao, and in 1787, they entered Timbuktu, establishing the Pashalik as their tributary.

=== Zabarma Emirate (1860-1897) ===
The Zabarma Emirate was an Islamic state that existed from the 1860s to 1897 in what is now parts of Northern Ghana and Burkina Faso. Founded by the Zarma people, a subgroup of the Songhai, the Zabarma Emirate, despite its Zarma origins, was diverse, with the Zarma constituting a minority. It was primarily composed of Hausa, Fulani, Mossi, and notably the Gurunsi people, who played a crucial role as allies and soldiers.

The word "Gurunsi" is derived from the Zarma language, "Guru-si," meaning "iron does not penetrate." During the Zarma conquest of Gurunsi lands in the late 19th century, the Zarma leader, Baba Ato Zato (known as Babatu in the Hausa corruption of his name), enlisted a battalion of indigenous men who, after ingesting traditional medicines, were believed to be impervious to iron.

In 1887, Zabarma Emirate forces raided Wa, the capital of the Kingdom of Wala, prompting a significant population displacement.

This event marked the beginning of enduring playful ethnic banter and slavery jokes between the Zarma and the Gurunsi communities in Ghana.

Despite their minority status, the Zarma effectively enlisted followers of diverse origins, cultivating lasting loyalty. The Emirs of the Zabarima Emirate included Hanno or Alfa Hanno dan Tadano, Gazari or Alfa Gazare dan Mahama, and Babatu or Mahama dan Issa (commonly known as Babatu in colonial literature).

In a series of battles, the French, alongside local allies, defeated Babatu and his Zarma army at Gandiogo on March 14, 1897, and again at Doucie on June 23, 1897. Survivors fled south, prompting British military action in October 1897, concluding in June 1898 with the defeat of Babatu's former private army.

As the British presence expanded in Gambaga and areas east of the Black Volta, authorities of the Zabarma Emirate in the Gurunsi region fled eastward toward Dagbon.

=== Dares-Salam (Marabadiassa) imamate ( 1883-1898) ===
The Zerma warriors and traders from the Niger valleys, East of Niamey, under the leadership of Mori Ture, Zerma warlord and leader of militant Islam (Jihad) in current Northern part of Ivory Coast, attacked the Tagouana and Djimini, defeating the Tagouana and signing the truce with Djimini. A second Zerma attack brought all the southern senufo to arms.

The Zerma retreated to the frontier with the Baule (1895), where they founded Dares-Salam, their military and religious capital. It was renamed Marabadiassa, Maraba Diassa 'the citadel of the Zerma, by the Mandingo. From there they spread military expeditions and Islam in the region.

They allied with the Baoulé to organize the slave trade and the arms trade (rifle, cannon). Having made the Baoulé country a protectorate and the Wassoulou Empire their allies, the Zerma rallied to Samori Toure and attacked the Senufo again.

The Zerma Empire in Senufo country was an imamate that covered the region of the Vallée du Bandama District, Mankono region, all on the lands of the Senufo Tagouana and Djimini, with the Baoulé country as a protectorate. The power of the Zerma army based on the use of rapid cavalry, rifle and cannons, made it the most powerful ally of the Wassoulu Empire and the most powerful state of the late 19th century in the lands of the modern Ivory Coast.

=== Semassi Warriors of Togo and Northwest Benin (1875-1898) ===
Between 1883 and 1887, Zarma riders and mercenaries, the Semassi', operated on Togolese territory on behalf of slave traders. After having been co-opted by the Tem, they kidnapped children on the roads at the level of Fazao mountains, or further south, and place up to two or three of them on the same horse before fleeing. The Zerma Warriors, who numbered 500 horsemen equipped with rifles and cannons, built a great army by integrating the slaves they captured.

Between 1875 to 1898, commanded by the Zerma Warlords, Mayakki Mongoro and Mayakki Maali, the Semassi in Togo seized the regions of Savanes and Kara from the Moba and Kabye people. They made the Tem Tchaoudjo Kingdom in the Centrale Region (Sokodé) a protectorate, and pushed their conquests as far as Atakpamé. In Benin, Djougou was their protectorate, and they incessantly raided the Tammari people of Atakora. From 1890 to 1900, they had to bow to the projects and ambitions of the French and German colonial empires.

== Society and culture ==
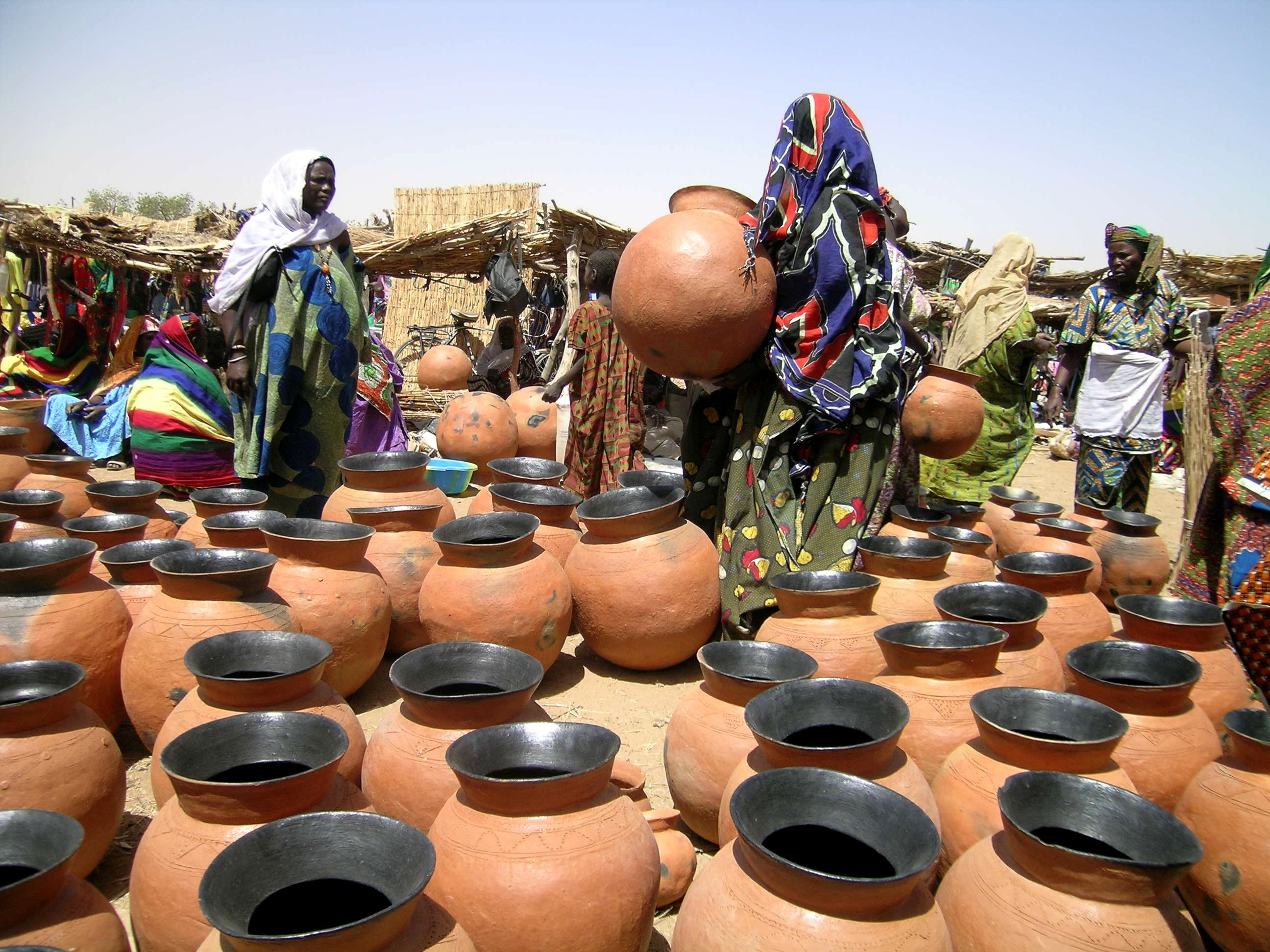
A Gorom-Gorom market selling Songhai pottery.

The language, society and culture of the Songhai people is barely distinguishable from the Zarma people. Some scholars consider the Zarma people to be a part of and the largest ethnic sub-group of the Songhai. Some study the group together as Zarma-Songhai people. However, both groups see themselves as two different peoples.

=== Social stratification ===
The Songhai people have traditionally been a socially stratified society, like many West African ethnic groups, with castes. According to the medieval and colonial era descriptions, their vocation is hereditary, and each stratified group has been endogamous. The social stratification has been unusual in two ways; it embedded slavery, wherein the lowest strata of the population inherited slavery, and the Zima, or priests and Islamic clerics, had to be initiated but did not automatically inherit that profession, making the cleric strata a pseudo-caste.

Louis Dumont, the 20th-century author famous for his classic Homo Hierarchicus, recognized the social stratification among Zarma-Songhai people as well as other ethnic groups in West Africa, but suggested that sociologists should invent a new term for West African social stratification system. Other scholars consider this a bias and isolationist because the West African system shares all elements in Dumont's system, including economic, endogamous, ritual, religious, deemed polluting, segregative and spread over a large region. According to Anne Haour in 2013, a professor of African Studies, some scholars consider the historic caste-like social stratification in Zarma-Songhay people to be a pre-Islamic feature while some consider it derived from the Arab influence.

The different strata of the Songhai-Zarma people have included the kings and warriors, the scribes, the artisans, the weavers, the hunters, the fishermen, the leather workers and hairdressers (Wanzam), and the domestic slaves (Horso, Bannye). Each caste reveres its own guardian spirit. Some scholars such as John Shoup list these strata in three categories: free (chiefs, farmers and herders), servile (artists, musicians and griots), and the slave class.

The servile group were socially required to be endogamous, while the slaves could be emancipated over four generations. The highest social level, states Shoup, claim to have descended from King Sonni 'Ali Ber and their modern era hereditary occupation has been Sohance (sorcerer). Considered as being the true Songhai, the Sohance, also known as Si Hamey, are found primarily in The Songhai in the Tillabery Region of Niger, whereas, at the top social level in Gao, the old seat of the Songhai Empire and much of Mali, one finds the Arma who are the descendants of the Saadians invaders married to Songhai women.

The traditionally free strata of the Songhai people have owned property and herds, and these have dominated the political system and governments during and after the French colonial rule. Within the stratified social system, the Islamic system of polygynous marriages is a norm, with preferred partners being cross cousins. This endogamy within Songhai-Zarma people is similar to other ethnic groups in West Africa.

=== Livelihood ===
The Songhai people cultivate cereals, raise small herds of cattle, and fish in the Niger Bend area where they live. They have traditionally been one of the key West African ethnic groups associated with caravan trade.

Agriculture serves as the primary livelihood for the Songhai populations, adapted to the arid and semi-arid conditions in which they reside. The Sahel region experiences a three-month rainy season contrasted by a more extended dry period of eight to nine months. Irrigation is extensively used along the Niger river and in the Saharan oases. Notably, cereals dominate Songhai cultivation, with millet as the leading crop, followed by rice along the Niger River, wheat, and sorghum.

Wild cereals such as panicum leatum or wild fonio are harvested seasonally. The Songhai cultivate diverse crops, including tobacco, onions, spices, tubers, and moringa. Among the Northern Songhai population in Tindouf, Tabalbala, and Ingal, date palms and Mangoes are the most widely cultivated fruits, followed by oranges, watermelons, melons, and gourds.

The Songhai employ various tools for agriculture, including plows pulled by an oxen and tools like the hilar (hoe) and pitchfork. In precolonial times, they utilized servile labor razziers, evolving with modernization to include tractors and combine harvesters. Agricultural workers, known as boogou, assist farmers with labor. After harvest, Songhai often allow Fulani and Tuareg herders, or their own cattle, to graze the fields, reflecting their preference for meat.

=== Animal husbandry ===
The Songhai engage also in animal hunt. Settlements and villages primarily raise cattle, goats (especially the Sahelian breed), sheep, poultry (especially guinea fowl), and donkeys. Camels are raised for both travel and consumption, particularly in regions like Zarmaganda, Gao, and Timbuktu.

Nomadic Idaksahak and Igdalen pastoralists are involved in large livestock breeding, traversing valleys such as Azawagh, Azgueret, Irhazer, and Tilemsi; the Gourma riverbanks; and the foothills of the Aïr Mountains and Adrar. Their herds consist primarily of camels, alongside goats, sheep, and oxen. Living in tents, they primarily consume dairy products.

The horse holds a central role in Songhai society, earning the region the moniker "land of horses." Two distinct Songhai horse breeds, the Djerma (crossbreed of Dongola and Barb) and the war-prized Bagzan from the Aïr, showcase their expertise in horse breeding. Horse ownership in the Niger bend region rivals that of the Ethiopian plateau. The Songhai introduce their children to horses from adolescence, and in the past, noble families possess substantial horse quantities used for parades and field surveillance. Historically, guarding and maintenance of horses were entrusted to the most trustworthy captives, and villages used to organize horse racing competitions, notably on market days.

== Notable people ==
- Za el-Ayamen: Founder of Gao Empire
- Sonni Ali Ber (1464–1492): Military leader, conqueror, founder, and 1st Emperor of Songhai Empire.
- Sonni Baru ( 1492–1493): emperor of Songhai Empire
- Askia Muhammad (1493–1529): founder of Askia dynasty, Emperor of Songhai Empire, Caliph and Amir al-Mu'minin of Land of black.
- Askiya Musa (1529–1531): emperor of Songhai Empire.
- Askia Muhammad Bonkano (1531–1537): emperor of Songhai Empire.
- Askiya Isma'il (1537–1539): emperor of Songhai Empire.
- Askiya ishaq I (1539–1549): emperor of Songhai Empire.
- Askiya Dawud (1549–1582 or –1583): emperor of Songhai Empire.
- Askiya Mohammad El haj (1582–1586): emperor of Songhai Empire.
- Askiya Muhammad Bani (1586–1588): emperor of Songhai Empire.
- Askiya Ishaq II (1588–1592): emperor of Songhai Empire.
- Zarmakoy Sambo : Zarma King
- Babatu: Military leader and 3rd Emir of Zabarma Empire
- Djibo Bakary: president of the government council of Niger and leader of Sawaba party.
- Hamani Diori: 1st president of Niger Republic (1960–1974)
- Seyni Kountche: Military President of the Republic of Niger (1974–1987) and Head of the CMS, High Supreme Military Council (exceptional regime).
- Ali Saibou: Chief of the High Supreme Military Council and 3rd President of Niger (1987–1993).
- Ibrahim Hassane Mayaki:Prime Minister of Niger from 27 November 1997 to 3 January 2000, head of NEPAD since 2009.
- Amadou Toumani Touré: Army general and 4th President of Mali from 8 June 2002 to 22 March 2012.
- Salou Djibo: Army corps general, Chairman of the Supreme Council for the Restoration of Democracy. President of Niger from 18 February 2010 to 7 April 2011.
- Madaki Hawa Askya (15th–16th centuries): Daughter of Emperor Askia Muhammad I, wife of Sultan Muhammad Rumfa of the Sultanate of Kano, Queen of Kano, initiator of the office of Madaki in the Hausaland and grandmother of Sultan Muhammad Kisoki.
- Doctor Aben Ali (14th–15th centuries), Doctor at the Imperial Court of Gao, Doctor to Princess Salma Kassay, Doctor to Charles VII King of France on March 4, 1419, Founder of the traditional medicine Office in Toulouse, France.
- Mahmud Kati (1468–1552) Scholars of Timbuktu, Askia Muhammad I secretary, author of Tarikh al-fattash from Songhai Koyraboro subgroup.
- Mohammed Bagayogo (1523–1593): Sheikh, teacher of Sankore Madrasah, Philosopher, Arabic grammarian, from Songhai Koyraboro subgroup.
- Abdrahamane Sa'adi (1594–1655), son of Mahmud Kati and grandson of Askia Muhammad I,scholar, cadi of Djenné and author of Tarikh al-Sudan, from Songhai Koyraboro subgroup.
- Ahmad Baba al-Timbukti (1556–1627), (culturally and linguistically Songhai, descended from Berber and Songhai ancestors), Teacher, Jurist, Scholar, Arabic, Grammarian of Songhai Empire and Saadi Sultanate, from Songhai Koyraboro subgroup.
- Makhluf al-Balbali (unknown–1533), Islamic scholars of North Africa and West Africa, jurist and teacher in Timbuktu, Kano, Katsina and Marrakesh, from Songhai Belbali subgroup of Tabelbala.
- Abdoulaye Idrissa Maïga (born 1958), prime minister of Mali in 2017
- Mohamadou Djibrilla Maïga, Nigerien politician
- Djingarey Maïga, Nigerien film director and actor
- Abdoulaye Maïga, ambassador of Mali to the United States in 1960 and Czechoslovakia, Bulgaria and Rumania in 1964
- Abdoulaye Maïga (officer) (born 1981), appointed interim prime minister of Mali in August 2022
- Boureima Maïga, Burkinabé footballer
- Abdoulaye Maïga (footballer) (born 1988), Malian professional footballer
- Aïssa Maïga (born 1975), Senegalese/French actress
- Aminata Maïga Ka (1940–2005), Senegalese writer
- Choguel Kokalla Maïga (born 1958), prime minister of Mali 2021–2022
- Aminatou Maïga Touré, Nigerien diplomat. She was Niger's Ambassador to the United States from 2006 to 2010
- Habib Maïga (born 1996), Ivorian footballer
- Mamadou Maiga (born 1995), Malian/Russian footballer
- Modibo Maïga (born 1987), Malian footballer
- Ousmane Issoufi Maïga (born 1946), prime minister of Mali 2004–2007
- Soumeylou Boubèye Maïga (1954–2022), prime minister of Mali 2017–2019
- Zhosselina Maiga (born 1996), Russian basketball player
- Abou Maïga, Beninese footballer
- Ali Sirfi Maïga, Nigerien Minister of Justice (2000–2001)
- Abdul Salam Mumuni, Ghanaian filmmaker
- Ali Farka Toure, Malian singer and musician (1939–2006)
- Rahmatou Keita, Nigerien filmmaker
- Magaajyia Silberfeld, Nigerien-French actress
- Vieux Farka Touré, Malian singer and guitarist
- Khaira Arby, Malian singer (1959–2018)
- Mali Yaro, Nigerien Singer
- Nasir Idris, Nigerian unionist, educationist, politician and the current governor of Kebbi State
- Tukur Yusuf, Nigerian entrepreneur and CEO of Rufaida Drinks LTD
- Baba Salah, Malian Singer
- Thialé Arby, Malian Singer
- Moussa Poussy, Nigerien Singer
- Zalika Souley, Nigerien actress
- Abdoul Razak Issoufou, Nigerien athlete
- Soumaïla Cissé, Malian politician who served in the Government of Mali as Minister of Finance from 1993 to 2000.
- Moumouni Adamou Djermakoye, Nigerien politician
- Moussa Moumouni Djermakoye, Nigerien politician
- Ide Oumarou, Nigerien diplomat, government minister, and journalist. Ambassador to the United Nations(1980–1983). Secretary-general of the Organisation of African Unity(1985–1988)
- Issoufou Saidou-Djermakoye,Nigerien Politician who was elected to the French Senate in 1958. He was later United Nations Under-Secretary-General in charge of the Department of Political Affairs, Trusteeship and Decolonization.
- Djermkoy Maidanda Seydu, former Sultan of Dosso & first pharmacist in Niger
- Abdou Moumouni Dioffo, Nigerien physicist
- Barcourgné Courmo, Nigerien politician
- Foumakoye Gado, Nigerien politician
- Boubacar Haïnikoye, Nigerien footballer
- Salifou Modi, Nigerien army general
- Ali Maiga Halidu, Ghanaian politician
- Alhaji Salamu Amadu, Ghanaian businessman and philanthropist
- Alhaji Adam Iddrisu, Ghanaian businessman and founder of Global Haulage Company and The Royal Bank, Ghana

== See also ==
- Zarma people
- Zin Kibaru
- Goffa
- Souban cloth
