= Tadaksahak =

Songhay language

- Tadáksahak
- Native to: Mali, Niger
- Ethnicity: Dawsahak
- Native speakers: 170,000 (2022)
- Language family: Nilo-Saharan?: Songhay; Northern; Tadaksahak
- Writing system: Arabic script Latin alphabet

Language codes
- ISO 639-3: dsq
- Glottolog: tada1238
- Location of Songhay languages Northwest Songhay: Korandje Koyra Chiini Tadaksahak Tasawaq Tagdal Eastern Songhay: Tondi Songway Kiini Humburi Senni Koyraboro Senni Zarma language Songhoyboro Ciine Dendi

Tadaksahak
- People: Idaksahak
- Language: Tadáksahak

Tadaksahak (also Daoussahak, Dausahaq and other spellings, after the Tuareg name for its speakers, Dăwsăhak) is a Songhay language spoken by the pastoralist Idaksahak of the Ménaka Region and Gao Region of Mali. Its phonology, verb morphology and vocabulary has been strongly influenced by the neighbouring Tuareg languages, Tamasheq and Tamajaq.

== Phonology ==
=== Vowels ===
Phonemic vowels
	Front	Central	Back
Close	i, iː		u, uː
Mid	e, eː	ə	o, oː
Open	a, aː		

Phonetic vowels
	Front	Central	Back	
Close	i iː		u uː	
Near-close	[ɪ]			
Mid	e eː	ə	o oː	
Open-mid	[ɛ] [ɛː]	[ɐ]	[ʌ]	[ɔ ɔː]
Open	[æ]	a aː	[ɑ]	

=== Consonants ===
Phonemic consonants
		Labial	Alveolar		Post- alveolar	Velar	Uvular	Pharyngeal	Glottal
		Labial	plain	pharyngealized	Post- alveolar	Velar	Uvular	Pharyngeal	Glottal
Nasal		m	n	nˤ		ŋ			
Plosive/ Affricate	voiceless		t	tˤ	tʃ	k	q		
Plosive/ Affricate	voiced	b	d	dˤ	dʒ	ɡ			
Fricative	voiceless	f	s	sˤ	ʃ	x		ħ	h
Fricative	voiced		z	zˤ	ʒ	ɣ		ʕ	
Approximant			l	lˤ	j	w			
Flap			ɾ	ɾˤ					

== See also ==
- Tadaksahak word list (Wiktionary)
