= Dendi language =

Songhay language of northern Benin

Dendi
- Dandawa
- Native to: Benin, Niger, Nigeria
- Region: West Africa
- Ethnicity: Dendi
- Native speakers: (440,000 cited 2000-2021)
- Language family: Nilo-Saharan?: Songhay; Southern; Dendi
- Writing system: Latin

Official status
- Recognised minority language in: Benin

Language codes
- ISO 639-3: ddn
- Glottolog: dend1243
- Location of Songhay languages Northwest Songhay: Korandje Koyra Chiini Tadaksahak Tasawaq Tagdal Eastern Songhay: Tondi Songway Kiini Humburi Senni Koyraboro Senni Zarma language Songhoyboro Ciine Dendi

Dendi is a Songhay language used as a trade language across northern Benin (along the Niger River). It forms a dialect cluster with Zarma and Koyraboro Senni but it is heavily influenced by Bariba.

Dendi has been described as a four-tone language.

== Distribution ==
Dendi is mainly spoken in Northern Benin, where they are one of the main ethnic groups, and in neighbouring countries. The Dendi people in Benin are found in the Departments of Alibori, Borgou, Donga, and Atakora.

In Nigeria, they are found in Bordering States such as Kebbi State. The Dendi, who are a Songhai group, are also referred by the Hausa name Dendawa.

== Phonology ==
=== Consonants ===
		Labial	Alveolar	Palatal	Velar		Labial- velar	Glottal
		Labial	Alveolar	Palatal	plain	lab.	Labial- velar	Glottal
Nasal		m	n	ɲ	(ŋ)	ŋʷ	(ŋ͡m)	
Plosive	voiceless	(p)	t	c	k		k͡p	
Plosive	voiced	b	d	ɟ	ɡ		ɡ͡b	
Fricative	voiceless	f	s					h
Fricative	voiced		z					
Rhotic			r					
Lateral			l					
Approximant				j			w	

- /r/ may also be heard as a tap [ɾ].
- /p/ is only a marginal phoneme.
- /k, ɡ/ may be heard as palatal [c, ɟ] when before front vowels.
- /m/ may also be heard with [ŋ͡m] in complementary distribution.

=== Vowels ===
	Front	Central	Back
Close	i iː		u uː
Close-mid	e eː		o oː
Open-mid	ɛ ɛː		ɔ ɔː
Open		a aː	

== Writing system ==
Dendi alphabet
Uppercase	A	B	C	D	E	Ɛ	F	G	Gb	H	I	J	K	Kp	L	M	N	NY	Ŋ	Ŋw/Ŋm	O	Ɔ	P	R	S	T	U	W	Y	Z
Minuscules	a	b	c	d	e	ɛ	f	g	gb	h	i	j	k	kp	l	m	n	ny	ŋ	ŋw/ŋm	o	ɔ	p	r	s	t	u	w	y	z

The grave accent, the acute accent and the macron are used on vowels to indicate tones.
