= Ingalkoyyu people =

Ethnic group of Niger

Ingalkoyyu, Isawaghan
Total population
- 8,000 (1998)

Languages
- Tasawaq language

Religion
- Islam

Related ethnic groups
- Songhay, Zarma, Tuareg

The Ingalkoyyu or Isawaghan people are a Northern Songhay ethnic group around In-Gall in Niger. They speak Tasawaq, a Northern Songhay dialect.
