= Southern Songhay languages =

Language family

Southern Songhay
- Geographic distribution: middle Niger River (Mali, Niger, Benin, Burkina Faso, Nigeria)
- Linguistic classification: Nilo-Saharan?: Songhay; Southern Songhay
- Subdivisions: Tondi Songway Kiini; Humburi Senni; Koyraboro Senni; Zarma; Songhoyboro Ciine; Dendi

Language codes
- Glottolog: None east2431 (Eastern Songhay) koyr1240 (Koyra Chiini)

Southern Songhay is the more populous branch of the Songhay languages, centered on the Niger River, including Timbuktu and the old capital of Gao. It includes Zarma (Djerma), a major language of Niger.

== Languages ==
The languages are, approximately from upstream to downstream:

- Koyra Chiini
- Humburi Senni
- Tondi Kiini
- Koyraboro Senni
- Songhoyboro Ciine
- Zarma
- Dendi

== Classification ==
The subclassification of the Southern Songhay languages is problematic. Some researchers have provisionally classified it into Eastern and Western clades, but Heath 2005 described shortcomings of this model, and Nicolaï 1981 cautiously refrained from proposing to classify Southern Songhay into two or three divisions. The proposed western division contains Djenné Chiini and–most prominently–Koyra Chiini (KCh) (meaning "town language"), which is the local language of the historically eminent university town of Timbuktu in Mali (Tumbutu). The proposed Eastern division contains the remaining languages and dialects. Zarma (Djerma, Zabarma), the most widely spoken Songhay language, is a major language of southwestern Niger (downriver from and south of Mali) including in the capital city, Niamey. (In 2009, an official Malian government population estimate for the Djerma people residing in Mali is 3,300,000.) Downriver from Zarma in the country of Benin is Dendi, heavily influenced by the neighboring Bariba language of the Niger–Congo family. Upriver from Zarma is Songhoyboro Ciine, spoken northwards up to the border with Mali. In Mali, Koyraboro Senni or Koyra Senni (KS) (meaning "town dweller language"), is the language of the town of Gao, the seat of the old Songhay Empire. Koyra Chiini is spoken to its west. Humburi Senni, classified by Nicolaï 1981 as "Central Southern Songhay", is spoken in a Songhay language enclave around Hombori, south of the Niger River's great bend. Another Eastern Southern dialect called Tondi Songway Kiini (TSK) (meaning "mountain Songhay language"). Among the Malian Songhay languages, Tondi Songway Kiini is the only one with lexical tones, and in several ways it seems to be the most conservatively evolved member.

== Bibliography ==
- Charles, M. C. & J. M. Ducroz. 1976. Lexique songay–français, parler kaado du Gorouol. Paris: Leroux.
- Heath, Jeffrey. 1999. A grammar of Koyra Chiini: the Songhay of Timbuktu. Mouton de Gruyter. 453 pp
- Heath, Jeffrey. 1999. A grammar of Koyraboro (Koroboro) Senni: the Songhay of Gao. Köln: Köppe. 402 pp
- Heath, Jeffrey. 2005. Tondi Songway Kiini (Songhay, Mali): reference grammar and TSK–English–French dictionary. Stanford: CSLI. 440 pp
