= TWQ =

TWQ or twq may refer to:

- The Washington Quarterly, a political magazine published quarterly in United States
- Third World Quarterly, a peer-reviewed academic journal managed by Global South Ltd
- twq, the ISO 639-3 code for Tasawaq language, Niger
