= Tondi Songway Kiini =

Songhay language

- Native to: Mali
- Region: Mopti
- Native speakers: (3,000 cited 1998)
- Language family: Nilo-Saharan?: Songhay; Southern; Tondi Songway Kiini

Language codes
- ISO 639-3: tst
- Glottolog: tond1249
- ELP: Tondi Songway Kiini
- Location of Songhay languages Northwest Songhay: Korandje Koyra Chiini Tadaksahak Tasawaq Tagdal Eastern Songhay: Tondi Songway Kiini Humburi Senni Koyraboro Senni Zarma language Songhoyboro Ciine Dendi

Tondi Songway Kiini is a variety of Southern Songhai spoken in several villages in the area of Kikara, Mali, about 120 km west of Hombori. Westerners documented the existence of Tondi Songway Kiini in 1998.
