= Belbali people =

Ethnic group of Algeria

Belbali Arabic: البلبالية, romanized: al-Balbaliyyah
Regions with significant populations
- Tabelbala, Béchar Province: 3,000 (2010)

Languages
- Korandje

Religion
- Islam

Related ethnic groups
- Songhai, Zarma, Tuareg

The Belbali people (Arabic: البلبالية, romanized: al-Balbaliyyah) are the northernmost Songhay subgroup. They are found primarily in the villages of Kwara, Ifrenyu and Yami in the oasis of Tabelbala in Algeria's Béchar Province. Significant numbers are also in the town of Tindouf.
