= Journal of Language Contact =

- Discipline: Linguistics, Evolutionary linguistics, Historical linguistics, Language geography
- Language: English, French
- Edited by: Alexandra Aikhenvald, Robert Nicolaï

Publication details
- History: 2007–present
- Publisher: Brill Publishers
- Frequency: 1 or 2 issues/year

Standard abbreviations
- ISO 4: J. Lang. Contact

Indexing
- ISSN: 1877-4091 (print); 1955-2629 (web)
- OCLC no.: 502390968

Links
- Journal homepage; Journal page at publishers website

The Journal of Language Contact is a peer-reviewed academic journal published in English and French. It covers research on language contact, use, and change. This includes linguistic, anthropological, historical, and cognitive factors. The journal was established in 2007. The editors-in-chief are Alexandra Aikhenvald (The Cairns Institute, James Cook University) and Robert Nicolaï (University of Nice Sophia Antipolis).
