= Tagdal language =

Songhay language

Tagdal
- Tagdal-Tabarog
- Tihishit
- Native to: Niger
- Ethnicity: Igdalen, Iberogan
- Native speakers: 65,000 (2021)
- Language family: Nilo-Saharan?: Songhay; Northern Songhay; Tagdal
- Dialects: Tagdal; Tabarog
- Writing system: Tifinagh

Language codes
- ISO 639-3: tda
- Glottolog: tagd1238
- ELP: Tagdal
- Location of Songhay languages Northwest Songhay: Korandje Koyra Chiini Tadaksahak Tasawaq Tagdal Eastern Songhay: Tondi Songway Kiini Humburi Senni Koyraboro Senni Zarma language Songhoyboro Ciine Dendi

Agdal
- Person: Agdal
- People: Igdalan
- Language: Tagdal

Abarog
- People: Iberogan
- Language: Tabarog

Tagdal (Tuareg name: Tagdalt) is a mixed Northern Songhay language of central Niger. Ethnologue considers it a "mixed Berber–Songhay language", while other researchers consider it Northern Songhay. Nicolaï (1981) argued that Tagdal was originally derived from the Tuareg languages and adopted characteristics of Songhai rather than vice versa.

There are two dialects: Tagdal proper, spoken by the Igdalen people, pastoralists who inhabit a region to the east along the Niger border to Tahoua in Niger, and Tabarog, spoken by the Iberogan people of the Azawagh valley on the Niger–Mali border. The Iberogan sometimes refer to their language as Tagdal.

Nicolaï (1981) uses the name Tihishit as a cover term. Rueck & Christiansen say that

...the Igdalen and the Iberogan have for many purposes been treated as one group, and their speech forms are closely related. Nicolaï uses "tihishit" as a common designator for these two speech forms...; however, this term is ambiguous. "Tihishit" is a term of Tamajaq origin meaning "the language of the blacks". The Igdalen and Iberogan used it to refer to all Northern Songhay speech forms.

== Phonology ==
=== Consonants ===
		Labial	Alveolar		Post-alv./ Palatal	Velar	Uvular	Pharyn- geal	Glottal
		Labial	plain	phar.	Post-alv./ Palatal	Velar	Uvular	Pharyn- geal	Glottal
Nasal		m	n	nˤ		ŋ			
Plosive/ Affricate	voiceless		t	tˤ	tʃ	k	q		
Plosive/ Affricate	voiced	b	d	dˤ	dʒ	ɡ			
Fricative	voiceless	f	s	sˤ	ʃ	x		ħ	h
Fricative	voiced		z	zˤ	ʒ	ɣ		ʕ	
Tap			ɾ	ɾˤ					
Lateral			l	lˤ					
Approximant		w			j				

- /w/ may be heard as [ʋ] in the Tarbun dialect.

=== Vowels ===
	Front	Central	Back
Close	i iː		u uː
Mid	e eː	ə	o oː
Open		a aː	

- Each of the vowels /i, e, ə, a, o, u/ tend to fluctuate within the presence of the phonemes /x, ɣ, q, ʕ, ħ/ or of a pharyngealized consonant, as [ɨ, ɛ, ʌ, ɑ, ɔ, o].

== Grammar ==
Tagdal is an agglutinative language, most likely due to Tuareg influence.

=== Pronouns ===
Tagdal gets its pronominal system from Northern Songhay languages.

	Singular	Plural
1st	ɣɑy	iri
2nd	nin	ɑnji
3rd	ɑnga	ingi

Subject prefixes:
	Singular	Plural
1st	ɣɑ-	iri-
2nd	ɘn/ni-	ɑnji-
3rd	ɑ-	i-

Tadgal has two different prefixes used for negation. The first is nɘ-, which functions as perfective negation, and is the default choice for negation. It indicates something that might have happened in the past, but didn't, or in the case of stative verbs, something that is not true. The other negation prefix is sɘ-, which acts as a negation in the present or future. Uses of this negation are shown in these examples:

- ɣɑnɘkoy: I did not go
- ɣɑsɘbkoy: I was not going/I do not (habitually) go
- ɣɑnəyɑrdɑ: I disagree
