= Robert Nicolaï =

French linguist

- Occupation: Linguist

Academic work
- Institutions: University of Nice Sophia Antipolis
- Main interests: Songhay languages

Robert Nicolaï is a French linguist specializing in the Songhay languages, professor at the University of Nice Sophia Antipolis.

He is also founder and co-editor of the Journal of Language Contact.

== Selected publications ==
- Nicolaï, Robert (1981). Les dialectes du songhay (contribution à l'étude des changements linguistiques). Paris: SELAF
- Nicolaï, Robert (1984). Préliminaires à une étude sur l'origine du songhay (problématique, matériaux et hypothèses). Berlin: Dietrich Reimer.
- Nicolaï, Robert (1990). Parentés linguistiques (à propos du songhay). Paris: Editions du CNRS.
- Nicolaï, Robert; Zima, Petr (1997). Songhay. Münich/Newcastle: Lincom Europa.
- Nicolaï, Robert. (2000). La Traversée de l’empirique : essai d’épistémologie sur la construction des représentations de l’évolution des langues. Paris: Ophrys.
- Nicolaï, Robert (2003). La force des choses ou l’épreuve nilo-saharienne : questions sur les reconstructions archéologiques et l’évolution des langues. Köln: Rüdiger Köppe Verlag.
- Nicolaï, Robert (2007). La vision des faits, De l'a posteriori à l'a priori dans la saisie des langues. Paris: L'Harmattan.
