= Humburi Senni language =

Songhay language

Humburi Senni
- humburi ciini هُمْبُرِ ٺِينِ
- Native to: Burkina Faso, Mali
- Region: Hombori
- Native speakers: (81,000 cited 1999–2021)
- Language family: Nilo-Saharan?: Songhay; Southern; Humburi Senni
- Dialects: Hombori; Maransé
- Writing system: Latin; Arabic

Language codes
- ISO 639-3: hmb
- Glottolog: humb1243
- Location of Songhay languages Northwest Songhay: Korandje Koyra Chiini Tadaksahak Tasawaq Tagdal Eastern Songhay: Tondi Songway Kiini Humburi Senni Koyraboro Senni Zarma language Songhoyboro Ciine Dendi

Humburi Senni, or Central Songhay, is a variety of Southern Songhai spoken in the Hombori region, straddling the Burkina Faso–Mali border.

== Orthography ==
Table below illustrates the Latin alphabet for Humburi Senni in Mali, as standardized by "DNAFLA".

Humburi Senni Songhay Latin Alphabet (Mali)
A a	B b	C c	D d	E e	F f	G g	H h	I i	J j	K k	L l	M m	N n
[a]	[b]	[t͡ʃ]	[d]	[e]	[f]	[ɡ]	[h]	[i]	[d͡ʒ]	[k]	[l]	[m]	[n]
Ɲ ɲ	Ŋ ŋ	O o	P p	R r	S s	Š š	T t	U u	W w	Y y	Z z	Ž ž	
[ɲ]	[ŋ]	[o]	[p]	[r]	[s]	[ʃ]	[t]	[u]	[w]	[j]	[z]	[ʒ]	

Table below illustrates the Arabic (Ajami) alphabet for Humburi Senni, based on UNESCO.BREDA report on standardization of Arabic script in published in 1987 in Bamako.

Humburi Senni Arabic alphabet (Mali)
Arabic (Latin) [IPA]	ا ‌( - ) [∅]/[ʔ]	ب (B b) [b]	ت (T t) [t]	ٺ (C c) [t͡ʃ]	ث (S s) [s]	ج (J j) [d͡ʒ]
Arabic (Latin) [IPA]	ح (H h) [h]	خ (Kh kh) [x]	ݗ (Ŋ ŋ) [ŋ]	د (D d) [d]	ذ (Z z) [z]	ر (R r) [r]
Arabic (Latin) [IPA]	ز (Z z) [z]	ژ (Ž ž) [ʒ]	س (S s) [s]	ش (Š š) [ʃ]	ص (S s) [s]	ض (D d) [d]
Arabic (Latin) [IPA]	ط (T t) [t]	ظ (Z z) [z]	ع ( - ) [ʔ]	غ (G g) [ɡ]	ݝ (G g) [ɡ]	ڢ (F f) [f]
Arabic (Latin) [IPA]	ݠ (P p) [p]	ڧ (K k) [k]	ك (K k) [k]	ل (L l) [l]	م (M m) [m]	ن (N n) [n]
Arabic (Latin) [IPA]	ه (H h) [h]	و (W w) [w]	ؤ ( - ) [ʔ]	ي (W w) [j]	ئ ( - ) [ʔ]	ࢩ (Ɲ ɲ) [ɲ]

Vowel at the beginning of a word
A	E	I	O	U
Short Vowels
اَ	اٜ	اِ	اࣷ	اُ
Long Vowels
Aa	Ee	Ii	Oo	Uu
آ	اٜيـ / اٜي	اِيـ / اِي	اࣷو	اُو

Vowel at the middle or end of a word
a	e	i	o	u
Short Vowels
◌َ	◌ٜ	◌ِ	◌ࣷ	◌ُ
Long Vowels
aa	ee	ii	oo	uu
◌َا / ◌َـا	◌ٜيـ / ◌ٜـيـ ◌ٜي / ◌ٜـي	◌ِيـ / ◌ِـيـ ◌ِي / ◌ِـي	◌ࣷو / ◌ࣷـو	◌ُو / ◌ُـو
