= Proto-Songhay language =

Proto-Songhay or Proto-Songhai is the proposed reconstructed ancestor of the Songhay languages.

== Reconstruction of Proto-Songhay ==
Proto-Songhay
- Proto-Songhai
- Reconstruction of: Songhay languages

Below are some Proto-Songhay reconstructions:

Gloss	Proto-Songhay
person	*bòro
bird	*kídòw
scorpion, mosquito	*(n)děŋ
ashes	*bó:sú
stone, mountain	*tóndì
year	*gí:rí; *mán(n)à
yesterday	*bǐ:
ask	*há˜
bring	*kàte
thorn	*kárgí
skin	*kú:rú
blood	*kúdí
year	*gí:rí

Some Proto-Eastern Songhay reconstructions are:

Gloss	Proto-Eastern Songhay
thatch hut	*bùgù
armpit, wing	*fátá
thirst	*gèw
flank	*kéráw
mason wasp	*bímbín(í)
sweat	*súŋgáy

== See also ==
- Songhay languages – Group of languages of West Africa
- Nilo-Saharan languages – Proposed family of Native African languages
- Saharan languages – Small language family in the East Sahara desert
- Songhai Empire – Empire in West Africa from c. 1464 to 1591
