= Igdalen people =

Berber ethnic group in Niger, Mali, and Algeria

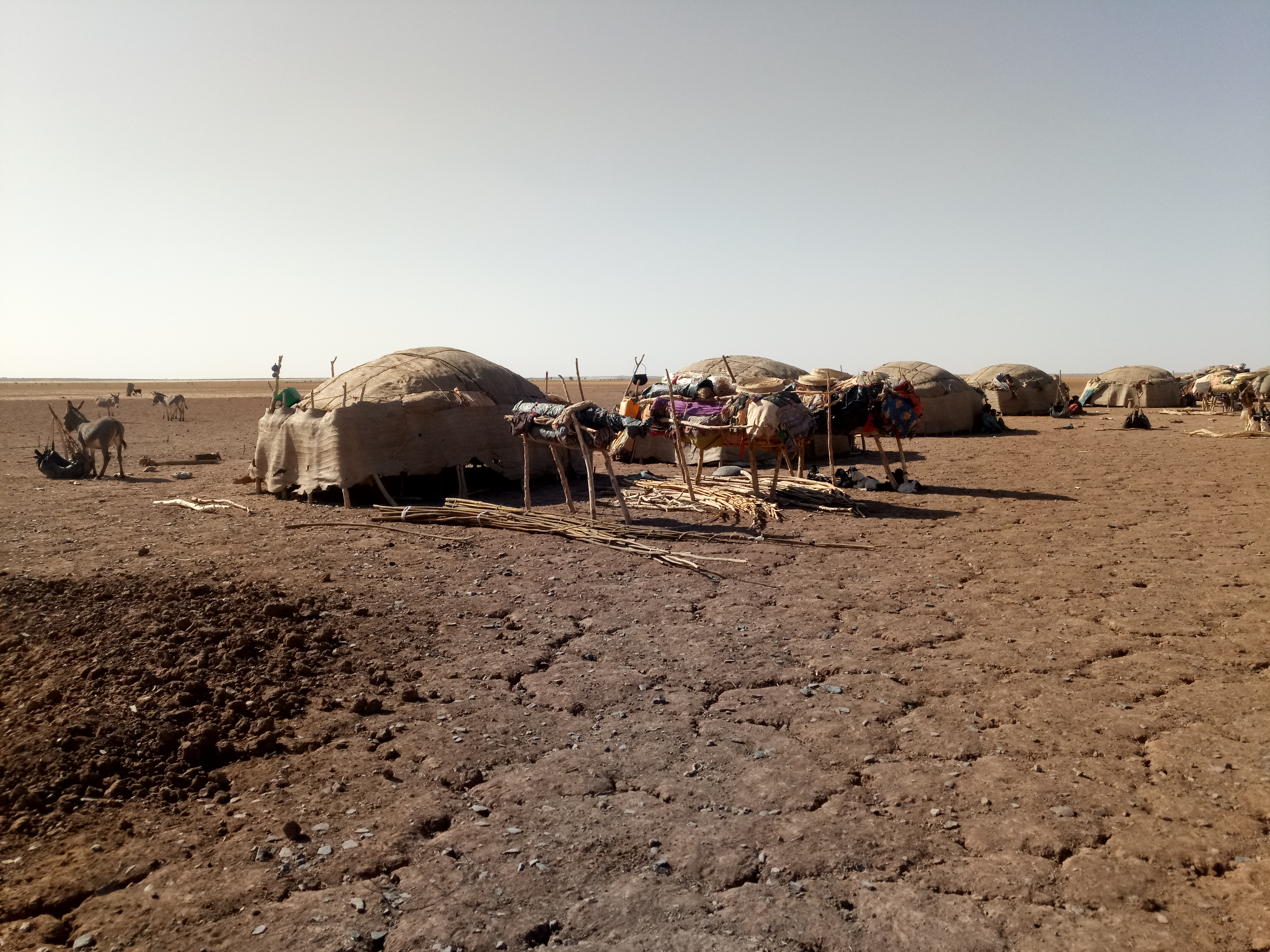
Igdalen homes during grazing season

The Igdalen (var.: Igdalan, Agdal) are a Berber people inhabiting northwestern Niger and parts of Mali and Algeria. They speak Tagdal, a mixed Tuareg–Songhay language. The Igdalen are closely related to Idaksahak people of eastern Mali and the Sawaq of Ingal in Niger, with whom they share a very similar language. Culturally, the Igdalen are often considered a Tuareg faction. In the past they have formed a sub-confederation with the Kel Fadey, Kel Ferwan and others in the Kel Ayr Tuareg confederation or Drum Group.

There are an estimated 27,000 Igdalen, and are centered on Tanout and Tchin Tabaraden in northern Niger, although seasonal transhumance with livestock take them well north and south. Igdalen are Muslim, and have previously been a Marabout (religious) and herding caste within Tuareg society.

The Igdalen do not form a single political or tribal group, but factions are through recent history attached to at least two aristocratic Tuareg tribes. These include the Kel Ferwan Immuzurag and Ikherkheren. In the Ingal area, the Igdalen are divided into two additional tribes, the Kel Tofey and the Kel Amdit.

The Igdalen are believed to have been among the first Berber people to move into the area, before large Tuareg groups migrated from the 11th to the 16th centuries CE. It is believed that Igdalen came to the Niger river valley from Morocco by the 11th century, moving up towards the Aïr Mountains.

== See also ==
- Dawsahak people
- Tuareg people
