= Abdou Hamani =

Rector of the University of Niamey
- In office 1982–1988
- Preceded by: Abdou Moumouni
- Succeeded by: Hamidou Arouna Sidikou

Minister of Communication, Culture, Youth and Sports
- In office 1994–1995
- Prime Minister: Souley Abdoulaye

Personal details
- Born: November 22, 1942 (age 83) Niamey, Niger
- Spouse: Married
- Children: 1
- Education: University of California, Los Angeles, University of Leeds, University Paris VII
- Occupation: Linguist, Professor, Politician
- Known for: Linguistic studies on Zarma language, Political service in Niger

Abdou Hamani (born 22 November 1942) is a Nigerien linguist, academic, and politician from Niamey. He is noted for his studies of the Zarma language and for serving as Rector of the University of Niamey and as Minister of Communication, Culture, Youth and Sports.

== Early life and education ==
Abdou Hamani studied on a scholarship at the University of California, Los Angeles, where he received a Bachelor’s degree in 1968, majoring in English language teaching. He then earned a Master of Arts degree from the University of Leeds in 1969. From 1969 to 1970, he worked as a research assistant at the Institut National de Documentation, de Recherches et d’Animation Pédagogiques (INDRAP) in Niamey. He completed his doctorate in 1972 at University Paris VII with a dissertation proposing a new model for teaching English in Niger.

== Academic career ==
From 1974 onward, Hamani served initially as an assistant professor at the University of Niamey (now Université Abdou-Moumouni). He specialized in the languages of Niger. Between 1976 and 1982, he held the position of Dean of the Faculty of Humanities. In 1982, he earned his habilitation from University Paris VII, focusing on the grammar of the Zarma language. That same year, he was appointed Rector of the University of Niamey, succeeding Abdou Moumouni, and held the position until 1988.

== Political career ==
From 1994 to 1995, Hamani served as Minister of Communication, Culture, Youth, and Sports and also acted as the government spokesperson during the administration of Prime Minister Souley Abdoulaye. After his stint in government, he returned to the University of Niamey as a professor of linguistics.

== Later work and contributions ==
As of the early 2000s, Abdou Hamani continued to teach linguistics at Université Abdou-Moumouni in Niamey. He authored several significant works, including Les femmes et la politique au Niger (Women and Politics in Niger), published by L’Harmattan in 2001.

== Major works ==
- L’enseignement de l’anglais au Niger. Nécessité et urgence d’un nouveau modèle (Doctoral thesis, University Paris VII, 1972)
- Note sur la dérivation en Zarma, Études linguistiques, Dept. of Linguistics, University of Niamey, Vol. 1, No. 1 (1979)
- "Caractérisation du système verbal zarma", in Itinérances... en pays Peul et ailleurs, Vol. 1: Langues (Société des Africanistes, 1981)
- De l’oralité à l’écriture: le zarma s’écrit aussi (INDRAP, Niamey, 1982)
- La structure grammaticale du zarma. Essai de systématisation (Habilitation, University Paris VII, 1982)
- Sarrusey ce-diraw sanniizey = Administrative vocabulary Zarma–French (Dept. of Linguistics, University of Niamey, 1984)
- Le français et les langues nationales au Niger. Relations inter-linguistiques et dynamique sociale (African Studies Center, Boston, 1988)
- Les femmes et la politique au Niger (L’Harmattan, Paris, 2001)

== Personal life ==
He is married and has one child.
