= Songhoyboro Ciine =

Songhay language

- Region: Niger (Songhai)
- Ethnicity: Songhay
- Native speakers: 946,000 (2014)
- Language family: Nilo-Saharan?: Songhay; Southern; Songhoyboro Ciine

Language codes
- ISO 639-3: –
- Glottolog: kaad1238
- Location of Songhay languages Northwest Songhay: Korandje Koyra Chiini Tadaksahak Tasawaq Tagdal Eastern Songhay: Tondi Songway Kiini Humburi Senni Koyraboro Senni Zarma Songhoyboro Ciine Dendi

Songhoyboro Ciine or Songhay Ciiné ([soŋojborotʃiːné] or [soŋajtʃiːné]) is an upriver dialect of the southern Songhay dialect of Niger. It is spoken mostly in the northwestern corner of Niger's Tillaberi region, an area known as Songhay: from Gorouol, a border town with Mali, down to the towns of Tera, Anzourou, Namari Goungou and Say.

Due to the high mutual intelligibility with the prestige dialect of Zarma in Niamey, it is common for Songhoyboro Ciine speakers to use the words "Zarma" and "Songhay" interchangeably when referring to their language. Songhoyboro Ciine is not, however, intelligible with Koyraboro Senni Songhai dialect of Gao in Mali. Some use the Peulh word "kado" (meaning; "stranger") to address this dialect although many of the dialect speakers consider it pejorative.
