= Korandje language =

Songhay language of Algeria

Korandje
- Kwarandzyey
- Native to: Algeria
- Region: Tabelbala, Béchar Province
- Ethnicity: Belbali
- Native speakers: 3,000 (2010)
- Language family: Nilo-Saharan?: Songhay; Northern; Korandje

Language codes
- ISO 639-3: kcy
- Glottolog: kora1291
- ELP: Kwarandzyey
- Location of Songhay languages Northwest Songhay: Korandje Koyra Chiini Tadaksahak Tasawaq Tagdal Eastern Songhay: Tondi Songway Kiini Humburi Senni Koyraboro Senni Zarma language Songhoyboro Ciine Dendi

Korandje (Korandje: kwạṛa n dzyəy; Arabic: البلبالية, romanized: al-Balbaliyyah) is a Northern Songhay language which is by far the most northerly of the Songhay languages. It is spoken around the Algerian oasis of Tabelbala by about 3,000 people; its name literally means "village's language". While retaining a basically Songhay structure, it is extremely heavily influenced by Berber and Arabic; about 20% of the 100-word Swadesh list of basic vocabulary consists of loanwords from Arabic or Berber, and the proportion of the lexicon as a whole is considerably higher.

The only published studies of Korandje based on first-hand data are Cancel (1908), a 45-page article by a French lieutenant covering basic grammar and vocabulary and a couple of sample texts; Champault (1969), an anthropological study containing some incidental linguistically relevant materials such as sentences and rhymes; Tilmatine (1991, 1996), an article (published in German, then reworked in French) revisiting Cancel and Champault and adding about a page of new data recorded by the author; and Souag (2010a, 2010b), the former arguing the case for Western Berber loans in the lexicon, the latter studying the effect of contact with Berber and Arabic on its grammar.

== Phonology ==
No complete phonological study of Korandje, systematically justified by minimal pairs, has yet been made. According to Souag (2010), the vowel system consists of lax ə, ŭ [ʊ], ə̣̣ [ʌ] and tense a [a], i, u, ạ [ɑ], ụ [o], while the consonant system is as follows:

		Labial		Coronal		Palatal	Velar		Uvular		Pharyngeal	Glottal
		plain	lab.	plain	pha.	Palatal	plain	lab.	plain	lab.	Pharyngeal	Glottal
Nasal		m	mʷ	n								
Plosive	voiceless			t	tˤ		k	kʷ	q	qʷ		ʔ
Plosive	voiced	b	bʷ	d	dˤ		g	gʷ				ʔ
Affricate	voiceless			t͡s								
Affricate	voiced			d͡z								
Fricative	voiceless	f	fʷ	s	sˤ	(ʃ)			x	xʷ	ħ	h
Fricative	voiced			z	zˤ	(ʒ)			ɣ	ɣʷ	ʕ	
Approximant			w	l	lˤ	j						
Trill				r	rˤ							

Items in brackets are not normally used by older speakers. A bilabial click is attested in one baby-talk word.

An earlier proposal by Nicolaï (1981), based on a very limited corpus of recordings provided by Champault, suggested a smaller phoneme inventory:

	Labial	Coronal	Palatal	Velar	Labiovelar	Glottal
Plosives	b	t d		k ɡ	kʷ ɡʷ	
Affricates		ts dz				
Approximants		l	j		w	
Fricatives	f	s z	ʃ ʒ	ɣ		h
Nasals	m	n				
Trill		r				

alongside pharyngealised consonants ṭ ḍ ṣ ẓ ṇ ḥ as well as x q, found mainly in loanwords, and a six-vowel system: a, i, u, e, o, and ə (schwa).

== Grammar ==
=== Pronouns ===
The pronouns are: aγəy, I; ni, you; ana, he/she/it; yayu, we; ndzyu, you (plural); ini, they. Possessive forms are ʕan, my; nən, your; an, his/her/its; yan, our; ndzən, your (pl.); in, their. Subject agreement prefixes on the verb are ʕa- I; n-, you; a-, he/she/it; ya-, we; ndz-, you (plural); i-, they.

=== Verbs ===
The infinitive and singular imperative are both the stem (e.g. kani "sleep"); the plural imperative takes a prefix wə- (wə-kkani "sleep! (pl.)"). Cancel describes the conjugations as follows (also for xani):

English	Preterite	English	Aorist
I slept	a xani	I sleep	a (ba) am xani
you slept	n(e) xani	you sleep	n ba am xani
he/she/it slept	a xani	he/she/it sleeps	a âm xani
we slept	ia xani	we sleep	ia âm xani
you (pl.) slept	nd'(a) xani	you (pl.) sleep	nd'ba âm xani
they slept	ia xan	they sleep	iba am xani

According to Tilmatine, verbs are negated by surrounding them with `as ... hé/hi, e.g. ni `as ba enγa hé > n`esbanγa hé "do not eat!". "No" is hoho or ho: n'd'xani bînu, willa ho? "did you sleep yesterday, or not?".

=== Nouns ===
The most productive plural marker is the clitic =yu:

tsəksi > tsəks=yu
"goat" {} "goats"

This marker comes at the end of the "core noun phrase", the unit consisting of noun+numeral+adjective+demonstrative:

ạḍṛạ inẓa bya=γ=yu
mountain three big=DEM=PL
"these three big mountains"

Some Berber loans retain versions of their original plurals, usually with the circumfix (ts)i-...-ən,

awṛəẓ > iwṛạẓən
"heel" {} "heels"

While the morphemes involved are clearly of Berber origin, the details of this system differ from any one attested Berber language, and this plural is extended to at least one item of Songhay origin, tsạṛə̣w "spoon" > tsiṛạwən. Some Arabic loans similarly retain Arabic plurals.

The possessive is expressed by the particle n, with the possessor preceding the possessed:

wi n tsə̣ffạ
woman POSS knife
"woman's knife"

== Numbers ==
The only non-Arabic numbers in normal use are a-ffu "one", inka "two", and inẓa "three". There also exist "cryptic" (argot) and children's counting systems. The syntax of numerals in noun phrases is complicated.
