= Koyra Chiini language =

Songhay language

Koyra Chiini
- koyra ciini / jenne ciini كࣷيْرَ ٺِينِ / جٜنّٜ ٺِينِ
- Native to: Mali
- Region: Niger River
- Native speakers: (200,000 cited 1999)
- Language family: Nilo-Saharan?: Songhay; Southern; Koyra Chiini
- Dialects: Djenné Chiini; Koyra Chiini
- Writing system: Latin; Arabic

Language codes
- ISO 639-3: khq
- Glottolog: koyr1240
- Location of Songhay languages Northwest Songhay: Korandje Koyra Chiini Tadaksahak Tasawaq Tagdal Eastern Songhay: Tondi Songway Kiini Humburi Senni Koyraboro Senni Zarma language Songhoyboro Ciine Dendi

Koyra Chiini ([kojra tʃiːni], figuratively "town language"), or Western Songhay, is a member of the Songhay languages spoken in Mali by about 200,000 people (in 1999) along the Niger River in Timbuktu and upriver from it in the towns of Diré, Tonka, Goundam and Niafunké as well as in the Saharan town of Araouane to its north. In this area, Koyra Chiini is the dominant language and the lingua franca, although minorities speaking Hassaniya Arabic, Tamasheq and Fulfulde are found. Djenné Chiini [dʒɛnːɛ tʃiːni], the dialect spoken in Djenné, is mutually comprehensible, but has noticeable differences, in particular two extra vowels (/ɛ/ and /ɔ/) and syntactic differences related to focalisation.

East of Timbuktu, Koyra Chiini gives way relatively abruptly to another Songhay language, Koyraboro Senni.

Unlike most Songhai languages, Koyra Chiini has no phonemic tones and has subject–verb–object word order rather than subject–object–verb. It has changed the original Songhay z to j.

== Phonology ==
Vowels
| | Front | Central | Back |
|---|---|---|---|
| Close | i | | u |
| Mid | e | | o |
| Open | | a | |

All vowels have lengthened counterparts.

Consonants
| | | Labial | Alveolar | Palatal | Velar | Glottal |
|---|---|---|---|---|---|---|
| Nasal | | m | n | ɲ | ŋ | |
| Plosive/ Affricate | voiceless | (p) | t | t͡ʃ | k | (ʔ) |
| Plosive/ Affricate | voiced | b | d | d͡ʒ | g | |
| Fricative | voiceless | f | s | (ʃ) | (x) | h |
| Fricative | voiced | | (z) | (ʒ) | | |
| Approximant | | | l | j | w | |
| Flap | | | ɾ | | | |

== Orthography ==
Table below illustrates the Latin alphabet for Koyra Chiini in Mali, as standardized by "DNAFLA".

Koyra Chiini Songhay Latin Alphabet (Mali)
| A a | B b | C c | D d | E e | F f | G g | H h | I i | J j | K k | L l | M m | N n |
| [a] | [b] | [t͡ʃ] | [d] | [e] | [f] | [ɡ] | [h] | [i] | [d͡ʒ] | [k] | [l] | [m] | [n] |
| Ɲ ɲ | Ŋ ŋ | O o | P p | R r | S s | Š š | T t | U u | W w | Y y | Z z | Ž ž | |
| [ɲ] | [ŋ] | [o] | [p] | [r] | [s] | [ʃ] | [t] | [u] | [w] | [j] | [z] | [ʒ] | |

Table below illustrates the Arabic (Ajami) alphabet for Koyra Chiini, based on UNESCO.BREDA report on standardization of Arabic script in published in 1987 in Bamako.

Koyra Chiini Arabic alphabet (Mali)
| Arabic (Latin) [IPA] | ا ‌( - ) [∅]/[ʔ] | ب (B b) [b] | ت (T t) [t] | ٺ (C c) [t͡ʃ] | ث (S s) [s] | ج (J j) [d͡ʒ] |
| Arabic (Latin) [IPA] | ح (H h) [h] | خ (Kh kh) [x] | ݗ (Ŋ ŋ) [ŋ] | د (D d) [d] | ذ (Z z) [z] | ر (R r) [r] |
| Arabic (Latin) [IPA] | ز (Z z) [z] | ژ (Ž ž) [ʒ] | س (S s) [s] | ش (Š š) [ʃ] | ص (S s) [s] | ض (D d) [d] |
| Arabic (Latin) [IPA] | ط (T t) [t] | ظ (Z z) [z] | ع ( - ) [ʔ] | غ (G g) [ɡ] | ݝ (G g) [ɡ] | ڢ (F f) [f] |
| Arabic (Latin) [IPA] | ݠ (P p) [p] | ڧ (K k) [k] | ك (K k) [k] | ل (L l) [l] | م (M m) [m] | ن (N n) [n] |
| Arabic (Latin) [IPA] | ه (H h) [h] | و (W w) [w] | ؤ ( - ) [ʔ] | ي (Y y) [j] | ئ ( - ) [ʔ] | ࢩ (Ɲ ɲ) [ɲ] |

Vowel at the beginning of a word
| A | E | I | O | U |
Short Vowels
| اَ | اٜ | اِ | اࣷ | اُ |
Long Vowels
| Aa | Ee | Ii | Oo | Uu |
| آ | اٜيـ / اٜي | اِيـ / اِي | اࣷو | اُو |

Vowel at the middle or end of a word
| a | e | i | o | u |
Short Vowels
| ◌َ | ◌ٜ | ◌ِ | ◌ࣷ | ◌ُ |
Long Vowels
| aa | ee | ii | oo | uu |
| ◌َا / ◌َـا | ◌ٜيـ / ◌ٜـيـ ◌ٜي / ◌ٜـي | ◌ِيـ / ◌ِـيـ ◌ِي / ◌ِـي | ◌ࣷو / ◌ࣷـو | ◌ُو / ◌ُـو |

== Sample text ==
Below is a sample text, a portion of a monologue recorded in Timbuktu in 1986. It describes the 1840 battle of Toya in which Tuaregs defeated a force from the Fula "Empire" which had its capital in Hamdullahi.

| English Translation | The Tuaregs, when they began — They took a great deal of this land's taxes, they oppressed them (=local people) with their iron rule. They took taxes to the point that they oppressed the people very much. So, they (=people) wrote to them (=distant leaders). They went to Hamdullahi, They told (=asked) Sékou (=a leader) to help them fight the Tuaregs. Sékou, he found one of his (own) pupils, whom they called 'Amadou Sambourou Kolado Doursoudi'. A pupil of his whom he had much confidence in. Sekou asked him (=Amadou), well, what did he (=Amadou) want? |
| Latin Alphabet | surgu di yo saa di kaa na i šintii hisa ka din gandoo alkaasu, i faraandi gi nda laamu, i din alkaasu di hal i hisa ka faraandi boro di yo saa di i hantum i se i koy hamdallaay, i har seeku se a ma faaba ŋgiye nda, ka yenje surgu di yo. seeku, a gar ŋgu wane taalib foo kaa se i-i har 'aamadu samburu koolado dursudi'. ŋga wane taalib foo kaa a-a hisa ka naaney ga, seeku har a se kaa aywa maa na a-a baa? |
| Arabic Alphabet | سُرْݝُ دِ يࣷ سَا دِ كَا نَ اِ شِنْتِي هِسَ كَ دِنْ ݝَنْدࣷ اَلْكَاسُ، اِ ڢَرَاندِ ݝِنْدَ لَامُ، اِ دِنْ اَلْكَاسُ دِ حَل اِ هِسَ كَ فَرَاندِ بࣷرࣷ دِ يࣷ سَا دِ اِ هَنْتُمْ اِ سٜ اِ كࣷيْ حَمدَلَّايْ،‌ اِ هَرْ سٜيكُ سٜ اَ مَ فَابَ ݗْݝِيٜ نْدَ، كَ يٜنْجٜ سُرݝُ دِ يࣷ. سٜيكُ، اَ ݝَر ݗْݝُ وَنٜ طَالِب فࣷو كَا سٜ اِئِ هَر «آمَدُ سَمْبُرُ كࣷولَدࣷ دُرسُدِ».ݗْݝَ وَنٜ طَالِب فࣷو كَا اَأَ هِسَ كَ نَانٜي ݝَ، سٜيكُ هَرْ اَ سٜ كَا اَيْوَ مَا نَ اَأَ بَا؟ |
