= Tamazheq language =

Tamazheq may refer to:

- Air Tamajeq language
- Tawallammat language

== See also ==
- Tamasheq language
