= Zarma language =

Songhay language of southwestern Niger

Zarma
- Djerma, Zabarma
- Zarma ciine, zarma sanni زَرْمَ ݘِينٜ / زَرْمَ سَنِّ
- Native to: Niger, Mali, Burkina Faso, Nigeria
- Region: West Africa
- Ethnicity: Zarma
- Native speakers: 6.0 million (2021)
- Language family: Nilo-Saharan?: Songhay; Southern; Zarma
- Dialects: Songhoyboro Ciine
- Writing system: Arabic (Ajami); Braille; Latin

Language codes
- ISO 639-3: dje
- Glottolog: zarm1239 Zarma
- Location of Songhay languages Northwest Songhay: Korandje Koyra Chiini Tadaksahak Tasawaq Tagdal Eastern Songhay: Tondi Songway Kiini Humburi Senni Koyraboro Senni Zarma language Songhoyboro Ciine Dendi

Zarma (Zarma Ciine/Sanni; Ajami: زَرْمَ ݘِينٜ / زَرْمَ سَنِّ) is a Songhay language that is the leading indigenous language of the southwestern lobe of the West African nation of Niger, where the Niger River flows and the capital city, Niamey, is located. Zarma is the second-most common language in the country, after Hausa, which is spoken in south-central Niger. With over 6 million speakers, Zarma is the most widely spoken Songhay language.

In earlier decades, Zarma was rendered Djerma, using French orthography, but it is usually now 'Zarma', the form that the Zarma people use in their language.

Alternative names for Zarma are Djerma, Jerma, Dyabarma, Dyarma, Dyerma, Adzerma, Zabarma, Zarbarma, Zabarmanci or Zerma.

== Geographic distribution ==
The majority of people who speak Zarma live in Southwestern Niger. It is also spoken in other parts of Niger, Mali, Burkina Faso, and Nigeria. Cities where Zarma is spoken include Tillaberi, Dosso, Niamey, Tahoua and Agadez.

In Nigeria, Zarma is spoken in bordering States such as Kebbi, near Nguru Road in Yobe State and communities in Niger State.

The Zarma people are also referred to as Zabarma or Zabarmawa.

=== Communities ===
Outside Niger, Nigeria and Mali, communities of speakers are found in the following other countries:

- Northern Benin
- Sahel Region and Est Region, Burkina Faso
- Urban Areas in Northern Ghana
- Savanes District, Ivory Coast
- Kara Region and Savanes Region, Togo
- Northern Cameroon
- Sudan

== Phonology ==
=== Vowels ===
There are ten vowels: the five oral vowels (/a/, /e/, /i/, /o/, /u/) and their nasalized counterparts. There is slight variation, both allophonic and dialectal. Vowel length is phonemically distinctive. There are a number of combinations of a vowel with a semivowel /w/ or /j/, the semivowel being initial or final.

=== Consonants ===
		Labial	Dental	Palatal	Velar	Glottal
Nasal		m	n	ɲ	ŋ	
Plosive	voiceless	p	t	c	k	
Plosive	voiced	b	d	ɟ ⟨j⟩	g	
Fricative	voiceless	f	s			h
Fricative	voiced		z			
Approximant		w	l	j ⟨y⟩		
Flap			ɾ ⟨r⟩			
Trill			r ⟨rr⟩			

The combinations /ɡe/, /ɡi/, /ke/ and /ki/ usually have some palatal quality to them and may even be interchangeable with /ɟe/, /ɟi/, /ce/ and /ci/ in the speech of many people.

All consonants may be short, and all consonants except /c/, /h/, /f/ and /z/ may be long. (In some dialects, long /f/ exists in the word goffo.)

=== Lexical tone and stress ===
Zarma is a tonal language with four tones: high, low, fall and rise. In Dosso, some linguists (such as Tersis) have observed a dipping (falling-rising) tone for certain words: ma ("the name").

Stress is generally unimportant in Zarma. According to Abdou Hamani (1980), two-syllable words are stressed on their first syllable unless that syllable is just a short vowel: a-, i- or u-. Three-syllable words have stress on their second syllable. The first consonant of a stressed syllable is pronounced a bit more strongly, and the vowel in the preceding syllable is weakened. Only emphasized words have a stressed syllable. There is no change of tone for a stressed syllable.

== Orthography ==
Zarma is primarily written in either Latin alphabet or Arabic alphabet (Ajami). Zarma as well as other Songhay languages, and other indigenous languages of the Sahel such as Fula and Hausa have been written in Arabic alphabet for centuries. The tradition of writing in Arabic dates back to the arrival of Islam via merchants of the Trans-Saharan trade, as early as the 12th century. The tradition of Arabic script in the Sahel and Sub-Saharan Africa came to be known as Ajami. Ajami has its own unique characteristics across various languages that differ from the Perso-Arabic tradition or Jawi tradition of Southeast Asia for example.

Latin alphabet came to be used for Zarma and other indigenous languages of the region in the beginning of the 19th century with the arrival of European Christian Missionaries and colonial administrators.

=== Latin alphabet ===
Table below illustrates the letters used in the Zarma Latin alphabet:

Zarma Songhay Latin Alphabet (Niger)
A a	B b	C c	D d	E e	F f	G g	H h	I i	J j	K k	L l	M m
[a]	[b]	[t͡ʃ]	[d]	[e]	[f]	[ɡ]	[h]	[i]	[ɟ]	[k]	[l]	[m]
N n	Ɲ ɲ	Ŋ ŋ	O o	P p	R r	S s	T t	U u	W w	Y y	Z z	
[n]	[ɲ]	[ŋ]	[o]	[p]	[r]	[s]	[t]	[u]	[w]	[j]	[z]	

Nasal vowels are written with a tilde or a following ⟨n⟩ or ⟨ŋ⟩. Officially, the tilde should go under the vowel (so̰ho̰), but many current works write the tilde over the vowel (sõhõ). Also, v may be used in a few words of foreign origin, but many Zarma cannot pronounce it.

Most of the letters are pronounced with the same values as the International Phonetic Alphabet (IPA), the exceptions being ⟨j⟩ [ɟ] (approximately English j but more palatalized), ⟨y⟩ [j], ⟨r⟩ [ɾ] (a flap). The letter ⟨c⟩ is approximately like English ch but more palatalized. The palatal nasal ⟨ɲ⟩ is spelled ⟨ny⟩ in older works.

Long consonants are written with double letters; ⟨rr⟩ is a trilled [r]. Long vowels are sometimes but inconsistently written with double letter. In older works, /c/ was spelled ⟨ky⟩ or ⟨ty⟩. Both ⟨n⟩ and ⟨m⟩ are pronounced as a labiodental nasal [ɱ] before ⟨f⟩.

Tone is not written unless the word is ambiguous. Then, the standard IPA diacritics are used: bá ("to be a lot": high tone), bà ("to share": low tone), bâ ("to want" or "even": falling tone) and bǎ ("to be better": rising tone). However, the meaning is almost always unambiguous in the context so the words are usually all written ba.

=== Arabic alphabet ===
Table below illustrates the Arabic (Ajami) alphabet for Zarma, based on UNESCO.BREDA report on standardization of Arabic script in published in 1987 in Bamako.

Arabic alphabet for Songhay languages in Niger differs in 5 characters from that of Mali. Otherwise, the two orthographies are the same, especially in how vowels are written.

Zarma Arabic alphabet (Niger)
Arabic (Latin) [IPA]	ا ‌( - ) [∅]/[ʔ]	ب (B b) [b]	ݒ (P p) [p]	ت (T t) [t]	ث (S s) [s]	ج (J j) [ɟ]
Arabic (Latin) [IPA]	ݘ (C c) [t͡ʃ]	ح (H h) [h]	خ (Kh kh) [x]	د (D d) [d]	ذ (Z z) [z]	ر (R r) [r]
Arabic (Latin) [IPA]	ز (Z z) [z]	س (S s) [s]	ش (Š š) [ʃ]	ص (S s) [s]	ض (D d) [d]	ط (T t) [t]
Arabic (Latin) [IPA]	ظ (Z z) [z]	ع ( - ) [ʔ]	غ (G g) [ɡ]	ݞ (Ŋ ŋ) [ŋ]	ف (F f) [f]	ق (K k) [k]
Arabic (Latin) [IPA]	ك (K k) [k]	ل (L l) [l]	م (M m) [m]	ن (N n) [n]	ٽ (Ɲ ɲ) [ɲ]	ه (H h) [h]
Arabic (Latin) [IPA]	و (W w) [w]	ؤ ( - ) [ʔ]	ي (Y y) [j]	ئ ( - ) [ʔ]		

Vowel at the beginning of a word
A	E	I	O	U
Short Vowels
اَ	اٜ	اِ	اࣷ	اُ
Long Vowels
Aa	Ee	Ii	Oo	Uu
آ	اٜيـ / اٜي	اِيـ / اِي	اࣷو	اُو

Vowel at the middle or end of a word
a	e	i	o	u
Short Vowels
◌َ	◌ٜ	◌ِ	◌ࣷ	◌ُ
Long Vowels
aa	ee	ii	oo	uu
◌َا / ◌َـا	◌ٜيـ / ◌ٜـيـ ◌ٜي / ◌ٜـي	◌ِيـ / ◌ِـيـ ◌ِي / ◌ِـي	◌ࣷو / ◌ࣷـو	◌ُو / ◌ُـو

=== Sample text ===
Below is a sample text, Article 1 of the Universal Declaration of Human Rights.

English Translation	All human beings are born free and equal in dignity and rights. They are endowed with reason and conscience and should act towards one another in a spirit of brotherhood.
Latin Alphabet	Fayanka kulu no si adamayzey nda care game ra i burcintara nda i alhakey ce-diraw kayandiyaŋ fondo ra da i na i hay. I gonda lakkal, nda laasaabu, kaŋ ga naŋ i ma baafunay ɲayzetaray haali ra.
Arabic Alphabet	فَيَنْكَ كُلُ نࣷ سِ اَدَمَيْزٜيْ نْدَ ݘَرٜ غَمٜ رَ اِ بُرݘِنْتَرَ نْدَ اِ اَلحَقٜيْ ݘٜدِرَوْ كَيَنْدِیَݞْ فࣷنْدࣷ رَ دَ اِ نَ اِ حَيْ. اِ غࣷنْدَ لَكَّلْ، نْدَ لَاسَابُ، كَݞْ غَ نَݞْ اِ مَ بَافُنَيْ ٽَيْزٜتَرَيْ حَالِ رَ.

== Morphology ==
=== General ===
There are many suffixes in Zarma. There are very few prefixes, and only one (a-/i- before adjectives and numbers) is common.

==== Nouns ====
Nouns may be singular or plural. There are also three "forms" that indicate whether the noun is indefinite, definite or demonstrative. "Form" and number are indicated conjointly by an enclitic on the noun phrase. The singular definite enclitic is -ǒ or -ǎ. Some authors always write the ending with a rising tone mark even if it is not ambiguous and even if it is not truly a rising tone. The other endings are in the table below. The definite and the demonstrative endings replace any final vowel. See Hamani (1980) for a discussion on when to add -ǒ or -ǎ as well as other irregularities. See Tersis (1981) for a discussion of the complex changes in tone that may occur.

	Indefinite	Definite	Demonstrative
Singular	-∅	-ǒ or -ǎ	-ô
Plural	-yáŋ	-ěy	-êy

For example, súsúbày means "morning" (indefinite singular); súsúbǎ means "the morning" (definite singular); and súsúbô means "this morning" (demonstrative singular).

The indefinite plural -yáŋ ending is often used like English "some". Ay no leemuyaŋ means "Give me some oranges." Usually, the singular forms are used if the plurality is indicated by a number or other contextual clue, especially for the indefinite form: Soboro ga ba ("There are a lot of mosquitoes"); ay zanka hinkǎ ("my two children"); hasaraw hinko kulu ra ("in both of these catastrophes").

There is no gender or case in Zarma so the third-person singular pronoun a can mean "he", "she", "it", "her", "him", "his", "hers", "its", "one" or "one's", according to the context and its position in the sentence.

=== Verbs ===
Verbs do not have tenses and are not conjugated. There are at least three aspects for verbs that are indicated by a modal word before the verb and any object nouns. The aspects are the completive (daahir gasu), the incompletive (daahir gasu si) and the subjunctive (afiri ŋwaaray nufa). (Beginning grammars for foreigners sometimes inaccurately call the first two "past and present tenses".) There is also an imperative and a continuing or progressive construction. Lack of a modal marker indicates either the affirmative completive aspect (if there is a subject and no object) or the singular affirmative imperative (if there is no subject). There is a special modal marker, ka or ga, according to the dialect, to indicate the completive aspect with emphasis on the subject. Different markers are used to indicate a negative sentence.

Modal Markers
		Affirmative	Negative
Completive		∅ or nà	mǎn or màná
Emphasized completive		ka or ga	mǎn or màná
Incompletive		ga	sí
Subjunctive		mà	mà sí
Progressive		go ga	si ga
Imperative	Singular	∅	sí
Imperative	Plural	wà	wà sí

Linguists do not agree on the tone for ga. Some say that it is high before a low tone and low before a high tone.

There are several words in Zarma to translate the English "to be". The defective verb tí is used to equate two noun phrases, with the emphasized completive ka/ga, as in Ay ma ka ti Yakuba ("My name is Yakuba"). The existential gǒ (negative sí) is not a verb (White-Kaba, 1994, calls it a "verboid") and has no aspect; it means "exist" and usually links a noun phrase to a descriptive term, such as a place, a price or a participle: A go fuwo ra ("She's in the house"). The predicative nô means "it is", "they are", etc. and is one of the most common words in Zarma. It has no aspect or negative form and is placed after a noun phrase, sometimes for emphasis: Ni do no ay ga koy ("It's to your house I'm going"). Other words, such as gòró, cíyà, tíyà and bárà are much rarer and usually express ideas, such as the subjunctive, which gǒ and tí cannot handle.

Participles can be formed with the suffix -ànté, which is similar in meaning to the past participle in English. It can also be added to quantities to form ordinal numbers and to some nouns to form adjectives. A sort of gerund can be formed by adding -yàŋ, which transforms the verb into a noun. There are many other suffixes that can make nouns out of verbs, but only -yàŋ works with all verbs.

Two verbs can be related with the word ká. (In many dialects it is gá, not to be confused with the incompletive aspect marker or the emphasized completive marker.) The connector ká implies that the second verb is a result of the first or that the first is the reason or cause of the second: ka ga ŋwa, "come (in order to) eat." A large number of idiomatic expressions are expressed with it: sintin ga ... or sintin ka means "to begin to ...", ban ga ... means "to have already ...", ba ga ... means "to be about to ..., gay ga ... means "it's been awhile since ...", haw ga ... means "to purposely ..." and so on.

== Syntax ==
Zarma's normal word order is subject–object–verb. The object is normally placed before the verb but may be placed after the verb for emphasis, and a few common verbs require the object after them. Unlike English, which places prepositions before a noun, Zarma has postpositions, which are placed after the noun: fuwo ra (in the house), fuwo jine (in front of the house).

When two nouns are placed together, the first noun modifies the second, showing possession, purpose or description: Fati tirǎ (Fati's book), haŋyaŋ hari (drinking water), fu meeyo (the door of a house). The same construction occurs with a pronoun before a noun: ni baaba ("your father"). All other modifiers of a noun (adjectives, articles, numbers, demonstratives etc.) are placed after the noun: Ay baaba wura muusu boŋey ("My father's gold lion heads", Tersis, 1981).

Here is a proverb in Zarma:

da curo fo hẽ, a-fo mana hẽ, i si jinde kaan-a bay
if bird one cry, NFP-one NEG.COMPL cry, they NEG.INCOMPL voice good-DEF know
"If one bird sings, and another doesn't sing, they won't know which voice is sweetest."

That means that "you need to hear both sides of the story".

== Bibliography ==
- Bernard, Yves & White-Kaba, Mary. (1994) Dictionnaire zarma-français (République du Niger). Paris: Agence de coopération culturelle et technique
- Hamani, Abdou. (1980) La structure grammaticale du zarma: Essai de systématisation. 2 volumes. Université de Paris VII. Dissertation.
- Hamani, Abdou. (1982) De l’oralité à l’écriture: le zarma s’écrit aussi. Niamey: INDRAP
- Tersis, Nicole. (1981) Economie d’un système: unités et relations syntaxiques en zarma (Niger). Paris: SURUGUE.
