= Hombori =

Hombori humburi (Humburi Senni Songhay)
- Commune and town

Names transcription(s)
  - Humburi Chiini: هُمْبُرِ
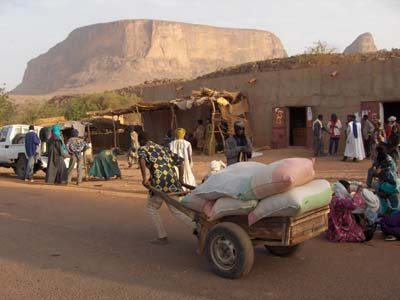

- Location within Mali
- Coordinates: 15°16′48″N 1°42′0″W
- Country: Mali
- Control: Jama'at Nusrat al-Islam wal-Muslimin
- Cercle: Douentza

Area
  - Total: 2,923 km^{2} (1,129 sq mi)

Population (2009 census)
  - Total: 23,099
  - Density: 7.902/km^{2} (20.47/sq mi)

Hombori is a small town and rural commune in the Cercle of Douentza in the Mopti Region of Mali. The commune contains 25 villages and in the 2009 census had a population of 23,099. The town lies just to the north of the Hombori Tondo mesa on the R15 highway linking Mopti and Gao.

Humburi Senni Songhay and Fulfulde are spoken in Hombori. There is a large Tuesday weekly market in the town.

== Climate ==
Hombori lies on the border between a hot arid climate (Köppen BWh) and a hot semi-arid climate (BSh). Almost all the rainfall occurs between late June and the middle of September. The mean annual rainfall in the period 1950 to 2007 was 372 millimetres or 14.6 inches but there are large year-to-year variations. The mean air temperature is 30.2 °C or 86.4 °F with the highest average occurring during May afternoons (42 °C or 107.6 °F) and the lowest during January mornings (17.1 °C or 62.8 °F). The provision of drinking water in the commune is difficult as there is no continuous aquifer which can be tapped by deep wells.

Climate data for Hombori (1961-1990)
Month	Jan	Feb	Mar	Apr	May	Jun	Jul	Aug	Sep	Oct	Nov	Dec	Year
Mean daily maximum °C (°F)	31.5 (88.7)	34.8 (94.6)	38.1 (100.6)	41.0 (105.8)	42.3 (108.1)	40.5 (104.9)	37.0 (98.6)	35.3 (95.5)	37.1 (98.8)	39.0 (102.2)	36.1 (97.0)	32.1 (89.8)	37.1 (98.8)
Daily mean °C (°F)	24.8 (76.6)	27.4 (81.3)	30.6 (87.1)	33.4 (92.1)	35.5 (95.9)	34.2 (93.6)	31.2 (88.2)	29.6 (85.3)	30.8 (87.4)	31.9 (89.4)	28.6 (83.5)	25.1 (77.2)	30.3 (86.5)
Mean daily minimum °C (°F)	16.7 (62.1)	19.2 (66.6)	22.6 (72.7)	26.0 (78.8)	28.8 (83.8)	27.8 (82.0)	25.2 (77.4)	24.3 (75.7)	24.6 (76.3)	24.5 (76.1)	20.7 (69.3)	17.1 (62.8)	23.1 (73.6)
Average rainfall mm (inches)	0.0 (0.0)	0.1 (0.00)	0.6 (0.02)	2.9 (0.11)	8.7 (0.34)	37.8 (1.49)	103.2 (4.06)	109.5 (4.31)	57.0 (2.24)	12.9 (0.51)	0.0 (0.0)	0.3 (0.01)	333.0 (13.11)
Average rainy days	0.0	0.1	0.4	0.4	1.0	5.2	8.1	9.8	7.7	1.8	0.0	0.1	34.6
Mean monthly sunshine hours	270.0	252.5	257.3	245.8	261.7	231.0	242.4	252.0	242.4	270.6	204.5	258.3	2,988.5
Source: NOAA

== Sites and fame ==
The town is known for its vernacular architecture of rock-built houses with narrow alleyways and tunnels. The area around Hombori features rock formations similar in appearance to those in the more well known Monument Valley and includes the Needles of Gami, a popular rock climbing location. Mount Hombori, Mali's highest point at 1153 meters, is nearby.

== History ==
Hombori is an ancient town of the Dogon people; its exact age is unknown. After the invasion of the Moroccan Saadi dynasty in 1591, one part of the royal family of Gao established themselves in Hombori. The Songhai, now the majority population, later followed the royal refugees to this area. Hombori remains a focus of Songhai Empire traditions but was also a strategic point for the conquest of southern Mali by the Songhai successor states.

Those local villages deeper in the hills (for example Tabi, 30 km away) were never conquered or directly colonised, and retain their traditional cultures.

The Songhai leadership were largely coopted by the French Colonial administration upon their arrival around 1900, while much of the Dogon community fled to nearby mountains, a process that had earlier begun to escape Moorish slave raids.

The religion of the community is Islam by a vast majority. Sufism and Shiism are the dominant belief systems in the area.

Some sequences of Souleymane Cissé's film, Yeelen, were shot in Hombori.

In 2022, the town was the site of a massacre when Malian Armed Forces and Wagner Group mercenaries opened fire at a market in retaliation of a bombing. Over 50 civilians were killed and over 500 were arrested.

During the 2026 Mali offensives, the Salafi Jihadist group Jama'at Nusrat al-Islam wal-Muslimin claimed to have captured the town, which was disputed by pro-government forces.

== Gallery ==
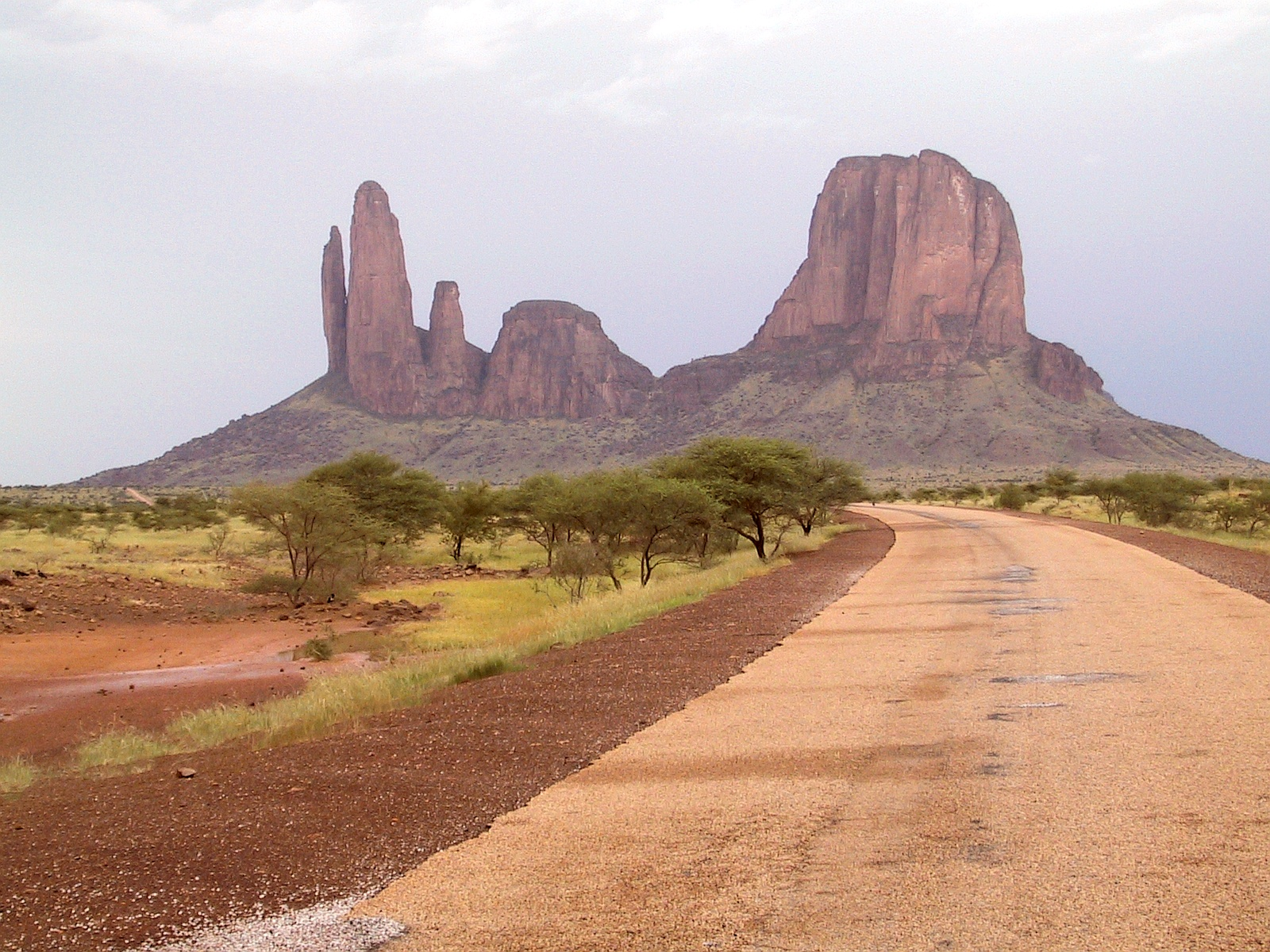
The nearby Hombori Tondo
