= Koyraboro Senni =

Songhay language

- كࣷيْرَبࣷرࣷ سٜنِّ
- Native to: Mali
- Region: East of Timbuktu, Gao
- Ethnicity: (850,000 (2007?))
- Native speakers: 430,000 (2007); 300,000 monolingual (2007)
- Language family: Nilo-Saharan?: Songhay; Southern; Koyraboro Senni

Language codes
- ISO 639-3: ses
- Glottolog: koyr1242
- Location of Songhay languages Northwest Songhay: Korandje Koyra Chiini Tadaksahak Tasawaq Tagdal Eastern Songhay: Tondi Songway Kiini Humburi Senni Koyraboro Senni Zarma language Songhoyboro Ciine Dendi

Koyraboro Senni (Koroboro Senni, Koyra Senni or Gao Senni) is a member of the Songhay languages of Mali and is spoken by some 400,000 people along the Niger River from the town of Gourma-Rharous, east of Timbuktu, through Bourem, Gao and Ansongo to the Mali–Niger border.

The expression "koyra-boro senn-i" denotes "the language of the town dwellers", as opposed to nomads like the Tuareg people and other transhumant people.

Although Koyraboro Senni is associated with settled towns, it is a cosmopolitan language which has spread east and west of Gao, to the Fula people living at the Mali–Niger border and to the Bozo people of the Niger River. East of Timbuktu, Koyra Senni gives way relatively abruptly to the closely related Koyra Chiini.

== Geographic distribution ==
The majority of speakers live in the Gao Region of Mali. It is also spoken in other parts of Mali and in other countries.

== Phonology ==
=== Consonants ===
		Labial	Alveolar	Palatal	Velar	Glottal
Plosive/ Affricate	voiceless	p (Note: /p/ is uncommon, occurring mainly from loanwords.)	t	t͡ʃ	k	ʔ (Note: /ʔ/ only occurs as a result of unassimilated Arabic words.)
Plosive/ Affricate	voiced	b	d	d͡ʒ	ɡ	
Fricative	voiceless	f	s	ʃ (Note: [ʃ ʒ] only occur as a palatalization of fricatives /s z/ preceding front vowels /e i/.)		h
Fricative	voiced		z	ʒ		
Nasal		m	n	ɲ	ŋ	
Lateral			l			
Trill			r			
Approximant		w		j		

=== Vowels ===
	Front	Central	Back
Close	i iː		u uː
Mid	e eː		o oː
Open		a aː	

Nasalized realizations of vowel sounds may also occur, but they are rare among different dialects.

== Orthography ==
Table below illustrates the Latin alphabet for Koyraboro Senni in Mali, as standardized by "DNAFLA".

Koyraboro Senni Songhay Latin Alphabet (Mali)
A a	B b	C c	D d	E e	F f	G g	H h	I i	J j	K k	L l	M m	N n
[a]	[b]	[t͡ʃ]	[d]	[e]	[f]	[ɡ]	[h]	[i]	[d͡ʒ]	[k]	[l]	[m]	[n]
Ɲ ɲ	Ŋ ŋ	O o	P p	R r	S s	Š š	T t	U u	W w	Y y	Z z	Ž ž	
[ɲ]	[ŋ]	[o]	[p]	[r]	[s]	[ʃ]	[t]	[u]	[w]	[j]	[z]	[ʒ]	

Table below illustrates the Arabic (Ajami) alphabet for Koyraboro Senni, based on UNESCO.BREDA report on standardization of Arabic script in published in 1987 in Bamako.

Koyraboro Senni Arabic alphabet (Mali)
Arabic (Latin) [IPA]	ا ‌( - ) [∅]/[ʔ]	ب (B b) [b]	ت (T t) [t]	ٺ (C c) [t͡ʃ]	ث (S s) [s]	ج (J j) [d͡ʒ]
Arabic (Latin) [IPA]	ح (H h) [h]	خ (Kh kh) [x]	ݗ (Ŋ ŋ) [ŋ]	د (D d) [d]	ذ (Z z) [z]	ر (R r) [r]
Arabic (Latin) [IPA]	ز (Z z) [z]	ژ (Ž ž) [ʒ]	س (S s) [s]	ش (Š š) [ʃ]	ص (S s) [s]	ض (D d) [d]
Arabic (Latin) [IPA]	ط (T t) [t]	ظ (Z z) [z]	ع ( - ) [ʔ]	غ (G g) [ɡ]	ݝ (G g) [ɡ]	ڢ (F f) [f]
Arabic (Latin) [IPA]	ݠ (P p) [p]	ڧ (K k) [k]	ك (K k) [k]	ل (L l) [l]	م (M m) [m]	ن (N n) [n]
Arabic (Latin) [IPA]	ه (H h) [h]	و (W w) [w]	ؤ ( - ) [ʔ]	ي (W w) [j]	ئ ( - ) [ʔ]	ࢩ (Ɲ ɲ) [ɲ]

Vowel at the beginning of a word
A	E	I	O	U
Short Vowels
اَ	اٜ	اِ	اࣷ	اُ
Long Vowels
Aa	Ee	Ii	Oo	Uu
آ	اٜيـ / اٜي	اِيـ / اِي	اࣷو	اُو

Vowel at the middle or end of a word
a	e	i	o	u
Short Vowels
◌َ	◌ٜ	◌ِ	◌ࣷ	◌ُ
Long Vowels
aa	ee	ii	oo	uu
◌َا / ◌َـا	◌ٜيـ / ◌ٜـيـ ◌ٜي / ◌ٜـي	◌ِيـ / ◌ِـيـ ◌ِي / ◌ِـي	◌ࣷو / ◌ࣷـو	◌ُو / ◌ُـو
