= Makhluf al-Balbali =

Makhlūf ibn `Alī ibn Ṣāliḥ al-Balbālī (Arabic: مخلوف بن علي بن صالح البلبالي; died after 1533) was an Islamic scholar of North and West Africa. He came from the oasis of Tabelbala. After spending his youth in trade, he studied in Walata and in Morocco, then travelled to West Africa to teach in Kano, Katsina, and Timbuktu, finally returning to teach in Marrakesh. While in Marrakesh he fell ill and returned to Tabelbala to die after the year 940 AH (1533/4.) Among his surviving fatwas is a judgement that slaves originating in established Muslim lands had the right to freedom.
