= Northern Songhay languages =

Language family

Northern Songhay
- Geographic distribution: scattered oases in Niger, Mali, Algeria
- Linguistic classification: Nilo-Saharan?: Songhay; Northern Songhay
- Subdivisions: Tadaksahak; Tagdal (Tagdal, Tabarog); Tasawaq; Korandje

Language codes
- Glottolog: nort2823

Northern Songhay is the smaller of the two branches of the Songhay languages. It is a group of heavily Berber-influenced dialects spoken in scattered oases of the Sahara.

== Languages ==
The nomadic varieties include Tihishit in central Niger around Mazababou (with two dialects, Tagdal and Tabarog) and Tadaksahak (or Dawsahak) spoken around Ménaka northeast of Gao (Heath 1999:xv). The sedentary varieties include Tasawaq in northern Niger (with two dialects, Ingelsi in In-Gall and the extinct Emghedeshie of Agadez) and Korandje far to the north, 150 km east of the Algerian–Moroccan border at Tabelbala.

== Classification ==
The main outside influence on all of these except on Korandje is the Tamasheq language cluster. Korandje appears to be influenced more by Northern and Western Berber; in turn, the neighboring Northern Berber language Taznatit shows a few traces of Songhay influence. Since the Berber influence in these languages extends beyond the lexicon into the inflectional morphology, Northern Songhay are sometimes viewed as mixed languages (Alidou & Wolff 2001).
