= Tasawaq language =

Songhay language

Tasawaq
- Tásàwàq
- Native to: Niger
- Region: Agadez
- Ethnicity: Isawaghan/Ingalkoyyu
- Native speakers: 21,000 (2021)
- Language family: Nilo-Saharan?: Songhay; Northern; Tasawaq
- Dialects: Ingelshi; Emghedeshie

Language codes
- ISO 639-3: twq
- Glottolog: tasa1240
- ELP: Tasawaq
- Location of Songhay languages Northwest Songhay: Korandje Koyra Chiini Tadaksahak Tasawaq Tagdal Eastern Songhay: Tondi Songway Kiini Humburi Senni Koyraboro Senni Zarma language Songhoyboro Ciine Dendi

Sawaq
- Person: Asawagh / Ingalkoy
- People: Isawaghan / Ingalkoyyu
- Language: Tasawaq / Ingelshi

Tasawaq (Tuareg name: Tesăwăq), sometimes also called Ingelshi, is a Northern Songhay language spoken by the Issawaghan or Ingalkoyyu, a community surrounding the town of In-Gall in Niger. A closely related variety called Emghedeshie was spoken in Agadez but is now extinct.

It shares some similarities with Berber languages, e.g. Tamasheq. For example in both languages, the grammatical gender of a noun is female if it begins and ends with the letter t.
