= Tabelbala =

Tabelbala تبلبالة
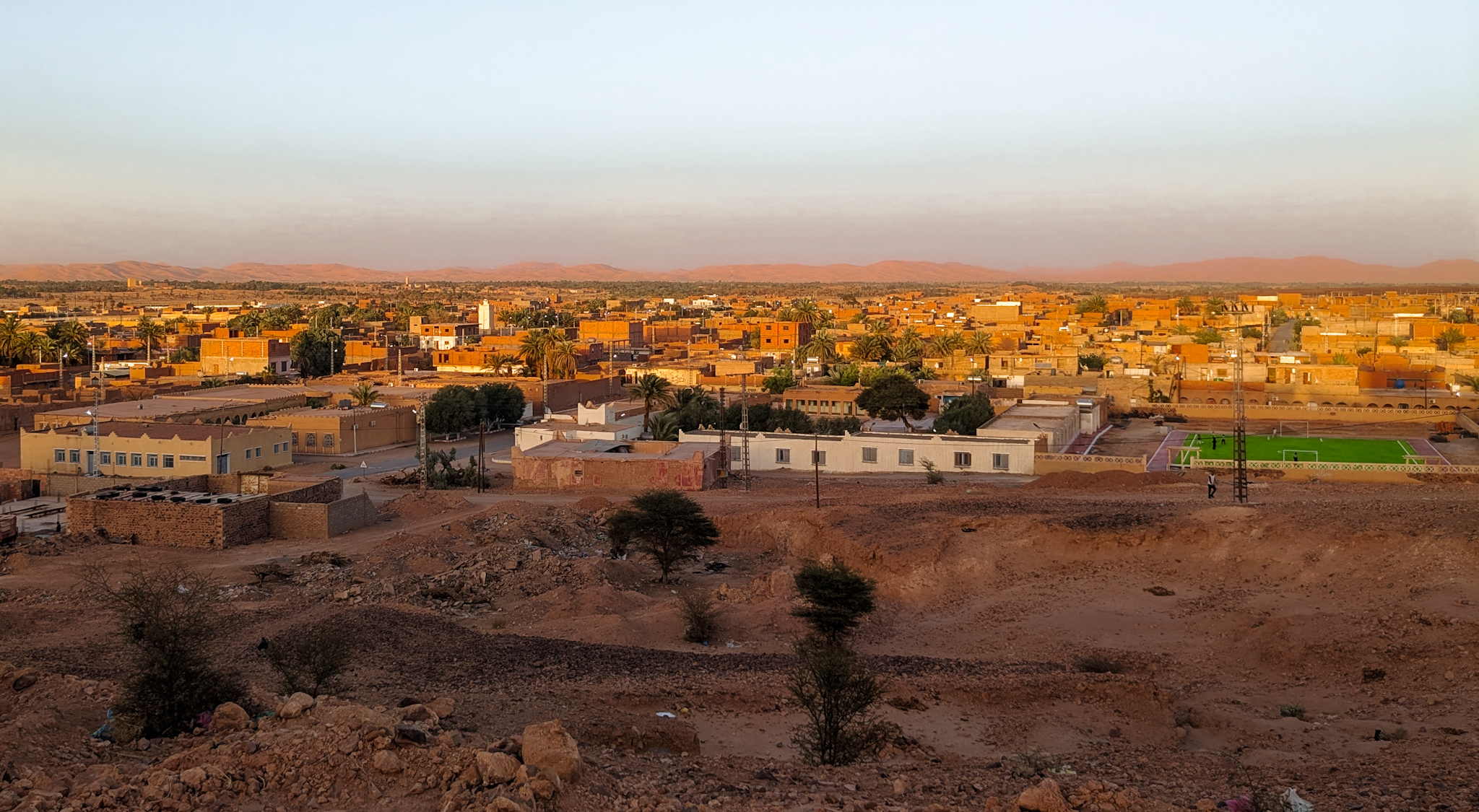

- Location of Tabelbala commune within Béchar Province (pre-2019)

- Location of Tabelbala within Algeria
- Coordinates: 29°24′N 3°15′W
- Country: Algeria
- Province: Béni Abbès
- District: Tabelbala District

Area
  - Total: 60,650 km^{2} (23,420 sq mi)
- Elevation: 518 m (1,699 ft)

Population (2008)
  - Total: 5,121
  - Density: 0.08444/km^{2} (0.2187/sq mi)
- Time zone: UTC+1 (West Africa Time)

Tabelbala (Arabic: تبلبالة, Berber languages: ⵜⴰⴱⵍⴱⴰⵍⵜ, romanized: Tabelbalt, Korandje: tsawərbəts) is a town and commune between Béchar and Tindouf in south-western Algeria, and is the capital, and only significant settlement, of the Daïra of the same name, encompassing most of the western half of Béni Abbès Province (part of Béchar Province until 2019). As of the 2008 census, its population was 5,121, up from 4,663 in 1998, with an annual growth rate of 1.0%. The commune covers an area of 60,560 square kilometres (23,380 sq mi), making it by far the largest commune in the province, as well as the least densely populated.

Tabelbala is notable for being the only town in Algeria to speak a language neither Arabic nor Berber, namely Korandje, which is spoken by about 3,000 people. Most of the rest of the population are descendants of twentieth-century immigrants to the oasis.

== History ==
From at least the 13th to the 19th century, Tabelbala was a stop on the caravan routes linking southern Morocco (notably Sijilmasa) to the Sahel, in particular Timbuktu.

== Geography ==
The oasis occupies a band of land between a stone mountain to the south and a large sand dune field, the Erg Er Raoui, to the north. The water table of the latter is relatively high, making irrigation agriculture possible. The foggara system was traditionally used, but has been in decline since the early twentieth century.

== Climate ==
Tabelbala has a hot desert climate (Köppen climate classification BWh), with extremely hot summers and mild winters, and very little precipitation throughout the year.

Climate data for Tabelbala
Month	Jan	Feb	Mar	Apr	May	Jun	Jul	Aug	Sep	Oct	Nov	Dec	Year
Mean daily maximum °C (°F)	19.8 (67.6)	23.0 (73.4)	26.9 (80.4)	31.7 (89.1)	36.5 (97.7)	41.8 (107.2)	46.0 (114.8)	44.3 (111.7)	38.5 (101.3)	31.7 (89.1)	24.8 (76.6)	19.6 (67.3)	32.1 (89.7)
Daily mean °C (°F)	11.9 (53.4)	14.9 (58.8)	18.8 (65.8)	23.2 (73.8)	27.9 (82.2)	32.9 (91.2)	37.0 (98.6)	35.7 (96.3)	30.6 (87.1)	24.1 (75.4)	17.8 (64.0)	12.6 (54.7)	24.0 (75.1)
Mean daily minimum °C (°F)	4.0 (39.2)	6.8 (44.2)	10.8 (51.4)	14.8 (58.6)	19.3 (66.7)	24.0 (75.2)	28.0 (82.4)	27.1 (80.8)	22.8 (73.0)	16.5 (61.7)	10.8 (51.4)	5.6 (42.1)	15.9 (60.6)
Average precipitation mm (inches)	0 (0)	2 (0.1)	5 (0.2)	0 (0)	0 (0)	0 (0)	1 (0.0)	2 (0.1)	0 (0)	2 (0.1)	8 (0.3)	2 (0.1)	22 (0.9)
Source: climate-data.org

== Localities ==
Tabelbala town is divided into four settlements. The administrative and commercial centre, "le Village" or "le Quartier", officially Haï El Wasat (Arabic: حي الوسط), also simply known as "Tabelbala" itself, is a relatively recent settlement which first grew up around the French fort in the colonial period. It is flanked by three older villages, or ksars: Cheraïa (Arabic: الشرايع, Ifrenyu in Korandje) to the west, Zaouia Sidi Zekri (Arabic: زاوية سيدي زكري, Kwara) and the tiny hamlet of Makhlouf (Arabic: مخلوف, Yami) to the east.

The commune is formally composed of seven localities:

- Tabelbala
- Cheraïa
- Zaouia Sidi Zekri
- Makhlouf
- Zeraïb
- Boutbiga
- Hassi Kharet

== Economy ==
Agriculture is the main industry in Tabelbala. The commune has a total of 2,155 hectares (5,330 acres) of arable land, of which 1,304 hectares (3,220 acres) is irrigated. There are a total of 139,183 date palms planted in the commune. As of 2009 there were 3,549 sheep, 9,949 goats, and 4,810 camels. There were also 138000 chickens.

== Infrastructure and housing ==
97% of Tabelbala's population are connected to drinking water, 100% are connected to the sewerage system, and 99% (including 2,527 buildings) have access to electricity. The city has a 3,048 kW power plant. There is one fuel service station in the town.

Tabelbala has a total of 1,083 houses, of which 625 are occupied, giving an occupation rate of 8.2 inhabitants per occupied building, the third highest in the province after Ouled Khoudir and Timoudi.

== Culture ==
Much of the Korandje-speaking population of Ifrenyu claims descent from the Ait Isfoul sub-branch of the Ait Atta Berber confederation; there are also a few Tamazight-speaking families from the Ait Khebbach, another Ait Atta sub-group.

According to oral tradition in both places, the founders of Melouka, near Adrar, Algeria, were emigrants who escaped Tabelbala when one of its ksars was destroyed by Arab nomads, variously named as the Rehamna or Ghenanma, for non-payment of tribute. The Idaw Ali of Mauritania also claim to have lived in Tabelbala at an early period.

== Religion ==
A number of reputed walis (saints) are buried in Tabelbala. In the main cemetery of Zaouia Sidi Zekri, imamaden, these include Sidi Zekri (the village's namesake), Sidi Larbi and Sidi Brahim (each said to be the ancestor of a family found there today), and a group of seven unnamed men, the seb`atu rijal (Arabic: سبعة رجال), as well as the sixteenth-century Islamic scholar Sidi Makhluf al-Balbali, who is also memorialised in a cenotaph in the hamlet named after him, Makhlouf.

Tabelbala has 4 operational mosques, with another 2 under construction.

== Transportation ==
Tabelbala's only significant transport link to the outside world is a paved road connecting it to the main Bechar-Tindouf highway some seventy kilometres away. Tabelbala is 382 kilometres (237 mi) from the provincial capital, Béchar.

There is a total length of 216 kilometres (134 mi) of roads in the commune.

== Education ==
There are 5 elementary schools, with 37 classrooms including 24 in use. There are a total of 1,104 school students.

5.1% of the population has a tertiary education, and another 18.0% has competed secondary education. The overall literacy rate is 75.0%, and is 81.9% among males and 68.2% among females.

== Health ==
Tabelbala has one polyclinic and 3 room care facilities. The nearest hospital is in Méchraâ Houari Boumédienne.

== Notable people ==
- Makhluf al-Balbali, jurist
