= Manding region =

Region located in West Africa

Manding, Manden or even Mandé is a region located in West Africa, a space between southern Mali and eastern Guinea. It is the historic home of the Mandinka community.

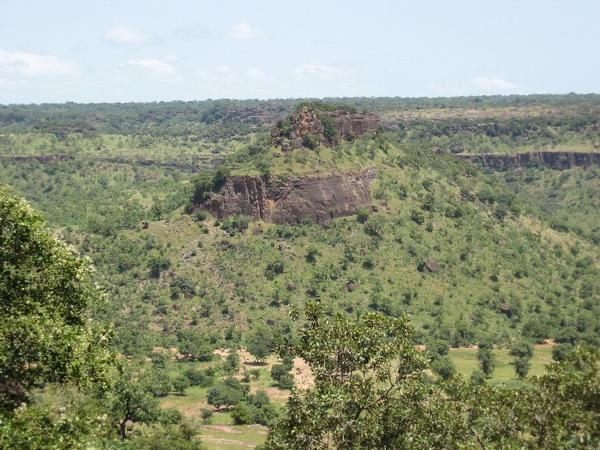
Manding landscape, Siby (Mali)

The Mandinka, or Malinke, are at the origin of the foundation of the largest empires in West Africa. Among the many groups linked to or originating from Manding, there are the Bambara, the Dyula, the Khassonke, the Konianké, the Mahou, Koyaka, the Dafing, the Bobo-Dioula and the Kuranko.

== Toponymy ==
According to Camara Laye, transcribing the words of griot Babou Condé, the name "Mandén" means "child of the hippopotamus" ("Man" meaning "hippopotamus" or "manatee" and "den" "child").

== Geography ==
The climate of Mande is called Sudanese. It is characterized by the alternation of seasons: a rainy season and a dry season.

It is the domain of the savannah which is distinguished by shrub vegetation. This region is characterized by the presence of tall grasses and clusters of shrubs, often isolated.

Karité, butter tree, néré, baobab, tamarinier, cheese are the main species of the Sudanese domain.

== History ==
Mande, one of the first states of West Africa, according to the Mandinka tradition, is a country whose origins are stated date back to the time of Sundiata Keïta (13th century) although further archeological evidence date the many ancient villages an cities to at least the 5th-7th centuries AD, and at most the 1st century BC to 2nd century AD. Manding is the province from which the Mali Empire started, under the leadership of Sundiata Keïta.

=== Origin of the Manding ===
Hunters from Wagadou (or Ouagadou) founded Mandy, the Mandingo country, notably the mythical ancestors Kontron and Sanin, at the origin of the Mandinka and Bambaras hunter brotherhood. This country was famous for the many animals and game that it sheltered, as well as its dense vegetation. It was a very popular hunting ground.

The Camara (or Kamara) are considered to be the oldest family to have lived in Manden, after having left, due to the drought, Ouallata, a region of Wagadou, in the south-east of present-day Mauritania. They founded the first village of Mandé, Kirikoroni, then Kirina, Siby, and Kita. The Mandé primitive was made up of twelve provinces and it seems to have been a confederation of the main Malinke tribes: Konaté, Condé, Traoré and Doumbia (also called Kourouma). Many of the families that make up the Mandinka community were born in Manding.

=== First kings of Mande ===
The first kings of Mande were hunters, Hamama was the first king. Mamadi Kani was a king hunter like the first kings of Manding. It was Mamadi Kani who invented the Sïmbon or whistle of hunter, he entered in communication with the geniuses of the forest and the bush; these had no secrets for him, he was loved by Kondolon Ni Sané. Mamadi Kani was the kingdom until the Bouré and bequeathed it to his sons Kanyogo simbo, Kani Simbo, Kabala Simbo and Kabari Simbo.

==== 1200-1218 ====
At Manding reign Moussa Balla Djigui Doumbia Karatabougou dit Allakoi; grandson of Hamama. Muslim devotee he made his pilgrimage to Mecca. He will be replaced by his son Naré Maghan Kon Fatta king of Dakadjalan. Faramanko keignou (the beautiful in Malinke), nickname of Naré Maghan Kon Fatta, will receive the clanic name of Konaté which means: to whom no one will say no.

==== 1218-1235 ====
Dankaran Toumani Konaté son of Naré Maghan, inherits the throne of his father while a prophecy wants it to be his younger Diata takes the throne. Following the enthronement of Dankaran, Soundiata and his mother go into exile from Mande and leave for Mema. During this period the king of Sosso, Soumaoro Kanté, ravaged what remained of the empire of Ghana and plundered the Mande. Following the arrival of Soumaoro Kanté at Manding, Dankaran Toumani fled the country and moved to what would become Kissidougou.

=== Birth of the Empire of Mali ===
Following the escape of Dankaran Toumani, the Malinkés remembered the prophecy and went in search of Soundiata who lived in Mema and became a great hunter.

==== 1235-1255 ====
Fakoli or Kourouma, nephew of Soumaoro Kanté joined the Mandingues coalition following the theft of his wife by the latter. During this period Soundiata and Soumaoro clashed at Kirina and Narena in Mande. Following these battles Soumaoro was defeated by Soundiata and he hid in the mountains of Koulikoro and disappeared. After this victory Soundiata, now Mansa, reunites his allies in Kaaba (Kangaba) for the Kourakan Fouga. Soundiata structured the Mandingo society and the hunters will create what is called the Kourakan Fouga charter. After that Soundiata unifies and divides the provinces of Mandé between the confederate clans: the Keita, the Konaté, the Camara and the Condé will remain the exclusive owners of Manding.

==== The campaign of Tiramakhan ====
According to tradition the king of the serene, Bassy Couloubaly Fall (others speak of Ndiadiane N'diaye), called Djolofin Mansa, stole the gold intended for the purchase of horses to the messengers of Soundiata. This insolence was a casus-belli and is at the origin of the long campaign of Tiramaghan towards the West. After the affront of Djolofin Mansa, Soundiata sends Tiramakhan Traoré to a peaceful country. After his triumphant return to the Manding Tiramakhan received as reward all the lands of the Faleme to the sea, it allowed him to found the kingdom of Kaabu. Around 1240 Tiramakhan and his clan emigrated to the West, with him will come Mansa Waali (son of Soundiata), Djeli Sirimang (brother of Balla Fasseké), Yedali and Yamoussa Kanté (of the clan of Soumaoro). In 1255 Soundiata died under mysterious circumstances.

=== Imperial Period ===
==== 1255-1275 ====
Following the death of his father, Mansa Oulé, son of Soundiata became emperor. during his reign he subdued the Songhai of Gao and enlarged the territory of the empire. In the same period, one of the generals of Soundiata, Moussa-Son-Koroma Sissoko, believing that Mansa Oulé did not make sufficient use of his services, settled in Koundian and founded the kingdom of Bambouk, vassal of Mali.

Mansa Oulé is replaced by Ouri Keita who reigns between 1270 and 1274, who is replaced by Khalifa between 1274 and 1275. After Khalifa's death, a brief period of anarchy took place in Mali.

==== 1275-1310 ====
Following the brief period of anarchy, Soundiata's nephew, Aboubakari Keita I becomes mansa. He died in 1285 and will be replaced by Sakoura freed slave that usurped the throne. Sakoura annexed the Kingdom of Diarra. Now Mali went from Manding to the Atlantic The reign of Sakoura lasted from 1285 to 1300. He will be replaced by Gaou who reigns for 5 years and will be replaced by Mansa Ko Mamadi who reigns for 5 years also.

==== 1310-1337 ====
Abubakari Keita II becomes king and tries to cross the Ocean twice but it was a failure. He reigns two years.

Moussa Keita became king of Mali and between 1324 and 1325 he made his famous pilgrimage to Mecca. the empire of Mande was at its peak.

=== Weakening of the empire ===
==== 1337-1380 ====
Between 1337 and 1341 Maghan I becomes Mansa and the Mossi of the Yatenga loot and occupy Timbuktu. In 1352 Suleiman becomes mansa. At the death of the latter troubles affect the royal court. Ndiadiane N'diaye founds the kingdom of Djolof which takes its independence aims towards Mali. Between 1360 and 1374 reign Mari Diata II, grandson of Moussa Keita. He will be replaced by Moussa who reigns for 6 years and is dismissed by Mari Diata.

==== 1380-1388 ====
The reign of Mari Diata lasted 7 years because he will be killed during an expedition in Bornou. He will be replaced by Maghan II brother of Moussa. In this period Mema, Gao and Djenné regain their independence from Mali.

==== 1388-1400 ====
Santigui, a freedman of the court usurped the throne. In the same period, Mamoudou Diawara seized Diarra. Around 1400 Maghan III, brother of Moussa II becomes mansa. During this period the Songhai empire gained power and its king Sonni Ma Daou attacked Mali and ravaged its capital. Later the Mossi invaded the eastern part of the Malian empire (Lake Debo).

=== Decline of the Manding Empire ===
==== 1400-1464 ====
In 1400 emerges the Peul kingdom of Macina with the arrival of Maghan Diallo. In the period between 1443 and 1464, the Mossi loot Oualatta. Around 1450 Moussa III then Oulé II became sovereign of Mali.

==== 1464-1492 ====
During this period Sonni Ali ber led several expeditions in the former provinces of Mali. Peuls Denianke from Fouta Djallon invade Mali and Mamadou II (1481–1496) asks for help from the Portuguese

==== 1600-1650 ====
Kaabu took advantage of the decline of Mali and gained its independence. This marked the junction between the Mandingos of the West and the Mandingos of the East.

In 1650 the Peuls of Macina and the Bambaras of Ségou ravaged what remained of the empire of Mali.

==== 1667-1670 ====
The last Mandé ruler, Mama Maghan, besieged Ségou but had to give up and admit defeat in 1670. He retired to Kangaba, reduced to the rank of a simple local leader. At that time, the empire of Mali is only a memory. During the following period, the Bambaras de Ségou established themselves as the dominant power in the region. The founder of their kingdom, established in the central delta of Niger, is Kaladian Coulibaly whose son, Danfassari, created the capital of Segou Koro near present-day Segou7.

==== 1795 ====
The Scottish Mungo Park reaches the Bambara kingdom of Kaarta. He cannot enter Segou but goes as far as Bamako before returning to Gambia through the Mandingo country and the Faleme valley.

==== February–March 1881 ====
First fighting between the French troops and those of the almamy Samory Touré, in the eastern part of the Mandingo country. This is the beginning of a struggle that spans the next seventeen years. Samory's troops were dispersed in April 1883 by Borgnis-Desbordes along the Oyako, a few kilometres south of Bamako.

=== Colonial period ===
The Manding region is colonized by France.

==== March 21, 1881 ====
Gallieni, who received in Nango the treaty signed on March 10 by Ahmadou, finds Borgnis-Desbordes in Kita. It then appears that, by playing with the Arabic translation, the treaty agreed to by Ahmadou falls far short of French requirements.

==== July 20, 1881 ====
The region between Sénégambie and Niger becomes the Haut-Fleuve region; its capital is Kayes.

==== June 1885 ====
The French of Commander Combes must withdraw after the battle at Niagassola, in the north-west of the Mandingo country, to the troops of Samory. They took their revenge in January 1886, which led to the signing of the Treaty of Kéniéba-Koura, not ratified by Paris because of its imprecision.

==== 1 October 1902 ====
The former French Sudan receives the name, after a new administrative transformation, of «territory of Senegal and Niger». Kayes' delegate now reports to the Governor of West Africa, separate from the Governor of Senegal.

==== 18 October 1904 ====
New decree reorganizing the general government of French West Africa and restoring its former boundaries to French Sudan, renamed «Haut-Sénégal et Niger».

==== December 4, 1920 ====
A decree gives the colony of Upper Senegal and Niger its previous name of «French Sudan». The term comes from the term “Bilad es Sudan” of the Arabs, which referred to the “Black Country”. It is under this name that the future Mali will be designated until independence

=== Independence ===
==== 20 June 1960 ====
Proclamation of the independence of Mali. The Manden will find itself entering the South of the former French Sudan which became Mali in reference to this same region and its empire

=== Localities in the region ===
- Kangaba
- Kela
- Dakadjalan
- Kita
- Siby
- Selefougou
- Narena
- Karan
- Faraba
- Kirina (Krina)
- Tabu
- Samalé
- Dogoro
- Samayana
- Sokondjala
- Nienkema
- Tiko-Kinèrioba
- Bancoumana
- Dankassa
- Niagassola
- Djoliba
- Niani
- Kéniéba-Koura
- Nana-Kenieba
- Sobara
- Balansan
- Figuiratomo
- Kiri-Koroni

== See also ==
- Mandinka
- Mandingo people of Sierra Leone
- Bambara

== Bibliography ==
- Djibril Tamsir Niane, Soundjata ou l'Épopée mandingue, Édition Présence africaine, 1960.
- Youssouf Tata Cissé, La Charte du Mandé et autres traditions du Mali, Albin Michel, 2003.
- Youssouf Tata Cissé et Wa Kamissoko, La Grande Geste du Mali : Des origines à la foundation de l'Empire, Édition Karthala, 2007.
- Camara Laye, Le Maître de la parole. Kouma Lafôlo Kouma Paris, Plon, 1978.
