= Sogolon Condé =

13th century Princess of Mali and mother of Sundiata Keita

Sogolon Wulen Condé (Gambian English: Sogolon Konte/Konteh) of Dò ni Kiri, commonly known as Sogolon Condé (in Malian French), was a 13th-century princess of Imperial Mali, and one of the prominent women portrayed in the Epic of Sundiata. Her trials and tribulations are well preserved in the epic. She was the second wife of Faama (King) Naré Maghann Konaté, and mother of Mansa Sundiata Keita, founder of the Mali Empire in the 13th century. According to Bamba Suso and Banna Kanute, Sogolong's father was Sankarang Madiba Konte, also known as Faa Ganda (probably Sangaran Madiba Konte, king of Sankaran, according to Conrad and Frank), a descendant of Khulubu Konte. In the epic, Sogolon is portrayed as the daughter of the "buffalo woman" (Dò Kamissa, from the land of Dô)–so-called because of her "ugliness" and hunchback, and so was Sogolong. The griots of Guinea refer to Sogolon as the younger sister of Do Kamissa. In many parts of the Senegambia region, and Mali, Sogolon is regarded as her daughter. As well as her physical deformities and "ugliness", Sogolon also gave birth to a disabled son (Sundiata), and was ridiculed for that. Following the death of her husband Naré Maghann Konaté, her co-wife, the politically ambitious Sassouma Bereté, Naré Maghann's first wife along with their first son Dankaran Toumani Keïta, plotted against Sogolon and her children, including assassination attempts on their lives. Fearing that the new King Dankaran and his mother Sassouma could inflict harm upon her and her children, Sogolon went into exile with her children to protect them from harm. Due to the power and influence of Dankaran and his mother, Sogolon and her children were refused asylum by many states within the Ghana Empire they traversed seeking protection. She was eventually granted asylum by the King of Mema (or Nema) Mansa Farin Tunkara. In Mema, Sogolon encouraged his disabled son Sundiata to fulfill his destiny, and return to Mali (Manden) and take the throne.

The King of Mema who admired Sundiata for his courage and tenacity despite his physical disability as a cripple (paralised from the waiste down) gave him important responsibilities in Mema. Following the conquest of the Mandinka people by the powerful and vailiant warrior Sosso King, Soumaoro Kanté, messengers were sent to search for Sogolon and her children, as Sundiata was destined to be a great leader according to the prophecy revealed to his late father prior to his marriage to Sogolon. The prohecy revealed to the late King Naré Maghann, was for him to marry a woman of Sogolon's physical's attributes as she would bear him a great heir despite her lack of physical beauty and hunchback. The messengers found Sogolon's children in Mema, and persuaded Sundiata to return home and liberate his people and their homeland. Sogolon had died prior to the messengers' arrival in Mema. Accompanied by a force of soldiers given to him by the King of Mema, Sundiata returned home with his siblings, and at the plains of Sibi, gathered some of the Mande warrior clans including the future conqueror of Kaabu, Mansa Tiramakhan Traore—where an alliance was formed to liberate their people and land from the powerful Soumaoro Kanté. That alliance resulted in the famous Battle of Kirina (1235), the battle which gave birth of the Mali Empire.

== Other names ==
There are many spelling variations of Sogolon's name depending on the West African country, and whether the country is a French or English speaking country. The last name Condé (Anglacised to Konde) is a variation of the French spelling "Conté" (Konte/Konteh/Conteh in English). Some of these variations are given below:

- Sukulung Conté (in Malian French)
- Sogolon Kédjou
- Sukulung Konte/Konteh/Conteh (in Gambian English)
- Sukulung Konte/Katuma
- Sogolon Konde

== Death ==
Sogolon died in Mema before her son Sundiata was crowned Mansaya. After her death, Sundiata returned to Mandea (or Manden) with his siblings including the Princess Kolonkan, herself a powerful woman in her own right, where Sundiata would go on to liberate his people and accept the kingship.

== Legacy ==
Sogolon Condé is remembered as a loving and supportive mother, who despite her lack of physical "beauty" and hunchback, and having "faced severe hardship", and giving birth to a disabled son for which she was much ridiculed for, she overcame that and helped her son overcame his disability. Upon the death of her husband, and sensing imminent danger to both herself and her children, she protected them by seeking asylum in a foreign land where she could ensure her family is safe and protected. In the Senegambia region, and in Mali, when the griots praises Sundiata Keita, he is sometimes praised through his mother Sogolon, for example one of the many names ascribed to Sundiata Keita is "Sogolon Djata/Jata", which in Mande mean son of Sogolon. His name "Sundiata" is believed to be a contraction of his mother's name "Sogolon Jata". His other name Mari Djata/Jata mean the Lion King. Sogolon had great ambitions for her son, and is regarded as the source of Sundiata's greatness. According to David Conrad et al., she is "one of the great heroines of Manding oral tradition, and her death is invariably noted as a significant event" in the narrative."

== See also ==
- Kouroukan Fouga
- Balla Fasséké
- Gbara

== Bibliography ==
- Conrad, David C., "Sunjata: a West African epic of the Mande peoples." (editors: David C. Conrad, Djanka Tassey Condé, trans. David C. Conrad), Hackett Publishing (2004), pp. xxi, xxxv, 30, 202, ISBN 0-87220-697-1
- Akyeampong, Emmanuel Kwaku; and Gates Jr., Professor Henry Louis; "Dictionary of African Biography, Volumes 1-6." (contributors and editors: Emmanuel Kwaku Akyeampong, Professor Henry Louis Gates Jr.), OUP USA (2012), p. 330, ISBN 9780195382075 (retrieved 22 April 2024)
- Suso, Bamba; and Kanute, Banna; "Sunjata: Gambian Versions of the Mande Epic." (translated by: Bakari Sidibe, Gordon Innes; contributors: Graham Furniss, Lucy Duran). Penguin UK (1999), p. 6, ISBN 9780141906348 (retrieved 22 April 2024)
- Parker, John, "Great Kingdoms of Africa." Univ of California Press (2023), p. 82, ISBN 9780520395671 (retrieved 22 April 2024)
- LaGamma, Alisa; Biro, Yaëlle; Cissé, Mamadou; Conrad, David C.; Diagne, Souleymane Bachir; McIntosh, Roderick; Farias, Paulo F. de Moraes; Paoletti, Giulia; Thiaw, Ibrahima; "Sahel: Art and Empires on the Shores of the Sahara." Metropolitan Museum of Art (2020), p. 40, ISBN 9781588396877 (retrieved 22 April 2024)
- Austen, Ralph A., "In Search of Sunjata: The Mande Oral Epic as History, Literature and Performance." Indiana University Press (1999), p. 198, note 11., ISBN 9780253334527 (retrieved 22 April 2024)
- Kai, Nubia, "Kuma Malinke Historiography: Sundiata Keita to Almamy Samori Toure." Lexington Books (2023), pp. 192, 205, 270, ISBN 9781493082667
- International Scientific Committee for the drafting of a General History of Africa, "General History of Africa: Africa from the Twelfth to the Sixteenth Century." UNESCO Publishing (1984), p. 131, ISBN 9789231017100 (retrieved 22 April 2024)
- Deme, Mariam Konaté, "Heroism and the Supernatural in the African Epic." Routledge (2010), p. 97, ISBN 9781136932649 (retrieved 22 April 2024)
- Niane, Djibril Tamsir (author & editor), "História Geral da África – Vol. IV – África do século XII ao XVI." (Volumes 1-8 of História geral da África). UNESCO (2010), p. 151. ISBN 9788576521266
- Conrad, David C., "Empires of Medieval West Africa." Infobase Publishing (2005), p. 35, ISBN 1-4381-0319-0
- Conrad, David C.; Frank, Barbara E.; "Status and Identity in West Africa: Nyamakalaw of Mande." Indiana University Press (1995), p. 106, ISBN 9780253112644 (retrieved 22 April 2024)
