= Twelve Doors of Mali =

The Twelve Doors of Mali were the possessions of the Mansa (emperor) of the medieval Mali Empire which was established in c. 1235 following The Battle of Kirina. These lands were either allied to or conquered by Sundiata Keita (the first Emperor of Imperial Mali) on his campaign to free the Mandinka heartland from the Sosso kingdom of Kaniaga.

== The Twelve Doors ==
Following his victory at Kirina, Sundiata Keita united the twelve towns of Mande known as the "twelve doors of Mali." He pacified these twelve towns and went on to bring prosperity to the land. The twelve doors of Mali are listed below:

- Bambougou, conquered by Fakoli Koroma
- The lands of the Bozo people, allied to Mali ("masters of the water")
- Djedeba, allied to Mali
- Do, from which all future Keita queens (such as Sogolon Condé, Sundiata's mother) would come from, allied to Mali
- Jalo, conquered by Fran Kamara
- Kaniaga, conquered by Mari Djata I (commonly known as Sundiata Keita)
- Kri/Kiri, allied to Mali
- Oualata, conquered by Mari Djata I
- Siby, allied to Mali
- Tabon, allied to Mali
- Toron, allied to Mali
- Zaghari, allied to Mali

== Historical significance ==
The twelve doors were the base of the Manden Kurufa (Manden Federation). With future conquests and re-organization, they would transform into the provinces of the Mali Empire. They remained important in the political and military circles of imperial power until the end of the Mali Empire in 1645.
