= Kiri (Kafo) =

- Common languages: Mandinka
- Religion: African traditional religion
- Government: Kafu
Preceded by	Succeeded by
Wagadu	Mali Empire
- Today part of: Mali

Kiri, also spelled Kri, was a kafu (a coalition of villages headed by a kafu-tigi) in the Niger River valley that was one of the core territories of the Mali Empire. It was ruled by the Traore family.

Oral sources mention two kingdoms in the area, Dô and Kiri (also called Mande or Malel). Kiri was located in the uplands between Siby and Niagassola. Naré Maghann Konaté, father of Sundiata Keita, was the king of Kiri.
