= Siby, Mali =

Siby Sibi
- Commune and village
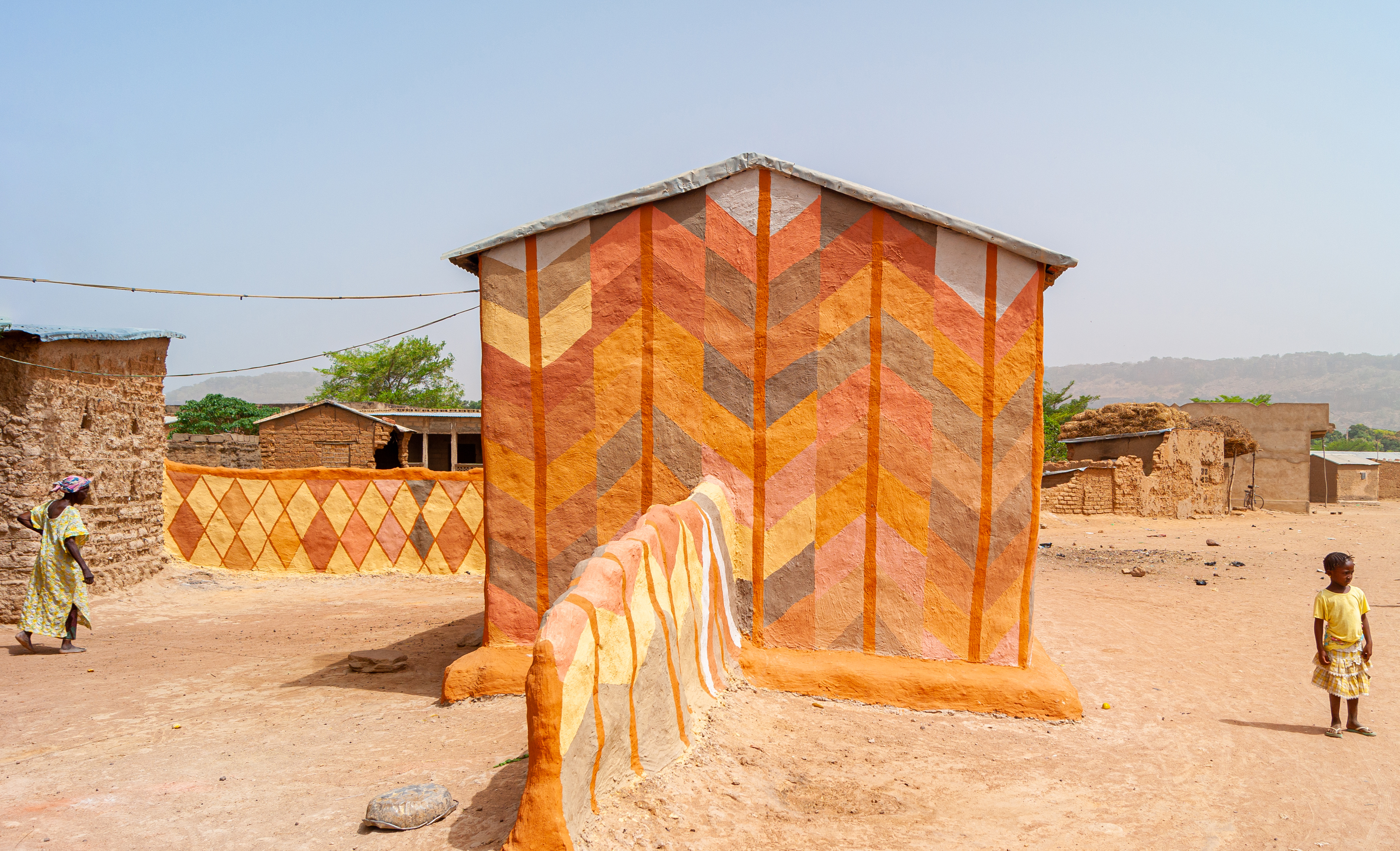
- Painted houses in Siby

- Location in Mali
- Coordinates: 12°22′43″N 8°20′0″W
- Country: Mali
- Region: Koulikoro Region
- Cercle: Kati Cercle

Area
  - Total: 1,001 km^{2} (386 sq mi)

Population (2009 census)
  - Total: 26,633
  - Density: 26.61/km^{2} (68.91/sq mi)
- Time zone: UTC+0 (GMT)

Siby is a village and rural commune in the Cercle of Kati in the Koulikoro Region of southern Mali. The commune contains 21 villages and in the 2009 census had a population of 26,632. The village lies 50 km southwest of the capital, Bamako, on the plain to the south of the Monts Mandingues. The RN5 road that links Bamako with Siguiri in Guinea runs through the village.

== History ==
The Mandé village of Siby was founded in the early Middle Ages by ancestors of the Camara. According to the Epic of Sundiata, the King of Siby, Kamandjan Kamara, whom Sundiata Keita knew from childhood, brought the kings of the tribes allied against Soumaoro Kanté, King of the Sosso, together at Siby. The troops of Sundiata Keita had just won two battles against the Sossos at Negueboria in the Bouré and at Kangigné. In Siby, all the allied kings found themselves gathered around Sundiata Keita: Kamandjan Kamara, king of Siby, his cousin Tabon wana Fran Kamara, king of the Camara blacksmiths, Siara Kouman Diabaté, Faony Diarra Kondé, king of the country of Dô, the country of Sogolon the mother of Sundiata, and Mansa Traoré. After a few days of rest, the allies went to Kirina where the decisive battle against Soumaoro Kanté took place.

On the top of the mountain, an arch, from where one has a splendid sight on the surrounding plain, is dug in the rock. According to legend, it was Kamandjan Kamara who transpierced the mountain with his sabre the day before the departure, during an evening where Balla Fasséké asked each king present if he was able to do so.

After the decline of the Mali Empire, the area around Siby was ruled from the city of Kangaba. Siby itself was a series of fortified villages on top of the escarpment. When the French colonized the area they built a highway at the base of the cliff, and gradually the local population relocated to the side of the road, with neighborhoods of the new town of Siby consisting of populations of the former clifftop villages.

== Further information ==
The city cooperates with Ramonville Saint Agne, France.

The first two editions of the Forum des peuples were held in Siby in 2002 and 2003.

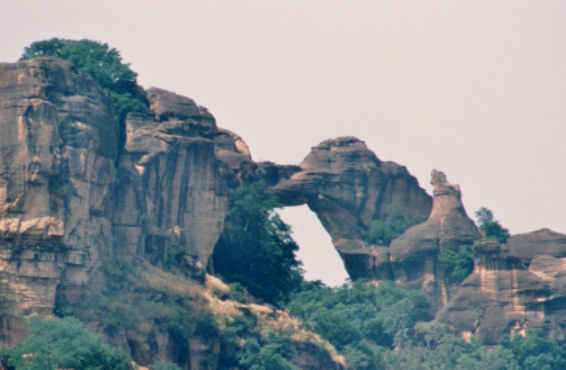
A local natural monument, the Arch of Kamandjan

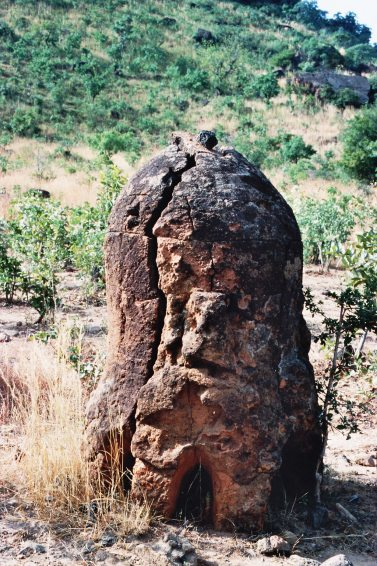
Old iron-smelting furnace near Siby

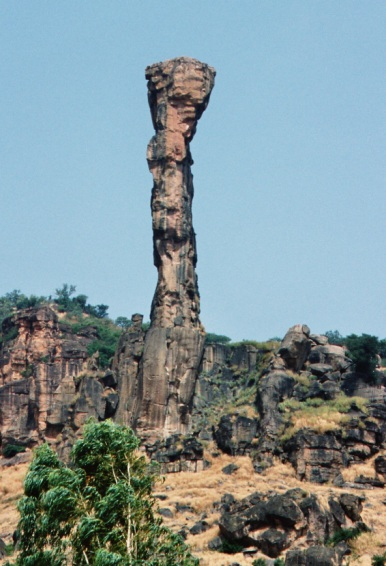
The Anvil of Niekema, a rock formation overlooking the village

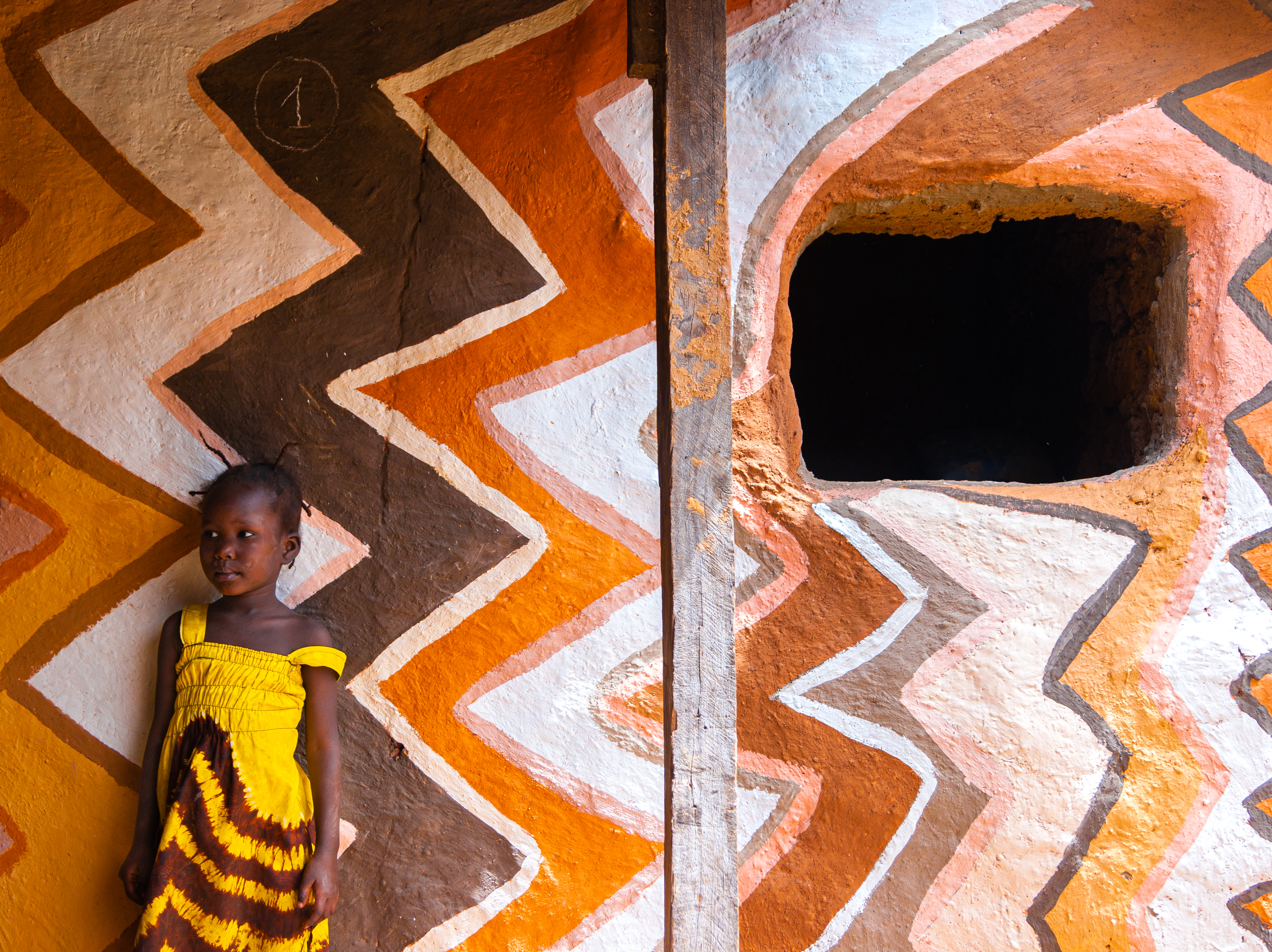
A young girl in front of a painted wall

== See also ==
- Twelve Doors of the Mali Empire
