= Kouyate family =

Dynasty of West African griots

Kouyate
- Current region: West Africa
- Origin: Mali Empire
- Founded: 13th century
- Founder: Balla Fasséké
- Titles: List: Belen-Tigui of the Mali Empire
- Connected families: Keita royal family

The Kouyate family is a dynasty of jelis (griots) that is native to West Africa. It has been prominent since the 13th century, when its founder took part in the founding of the Mali Empire.

== History ==
According to the Epic of Sundiata, Balla Fasséké was assigned to serve as a jeli by King Nare Maghann Konate to his son Prince Sundiata Keita in the latter's youth. He then went on to aid the prince in his subsequent quest to liberate his homeland from the despotic rule of the Sosso monarch King Soumaoro Kantè. He advised him during the war, telling him tales of the glory of his ancestors, and aided him in establishing a powerful state after the war's conclusion. Balla Fasséké then became the founder of the Kouyate family thereafter.

Jelis were the "present" each king gave his successor; they were the aristocratic oral historians that attended kings, recording and recalling the legacies of kings and kingdoms. Jelis are said to have existed "since time immemorial". Kouyates in particular have served as jelis for the Keita dynasty since the 13th century. The Kouyates guard customs, and their knowledge is authoritative amongst Malinkes. Keitas have to provide amenities to Kouyates, who in turn should not hesitate to ask for Keita help. The word Kouyate translates as "There is a secret between you and me". The family relic the Sosso Bala, a balafon that Sundiata is said to have given Balla Fasséké after the latter stole it from Kanté, is still played every year by the family's leader.

== Members ==
- Balla Fasséké
- Bassekou Kouyate
- Dani Kouyate
- Kandia Kouyate
- N'Faly Kouyate
- Sotigui Kouyate
- Jaliba Kuyateh

== Sources ==
- Gugler, Josef (2003), African Film: Re-Imagining a Continent, Bloomington, Indiana: Indiana University Press, ISBN 0-253-21643-5, OCLC 52520253
- Mamadou Kouyaté (performer) & Djibril Tamsir Niane (novelization): Soundjata ou l'Epopée Mandingue (Paris: Présence Africaine, 1960). Trans. G. D. Pickett: Sundiata: An Epic of Old Mali, London: Longmans, 1965
