= Kouroukan Fouga =

Mali Empire Constitution

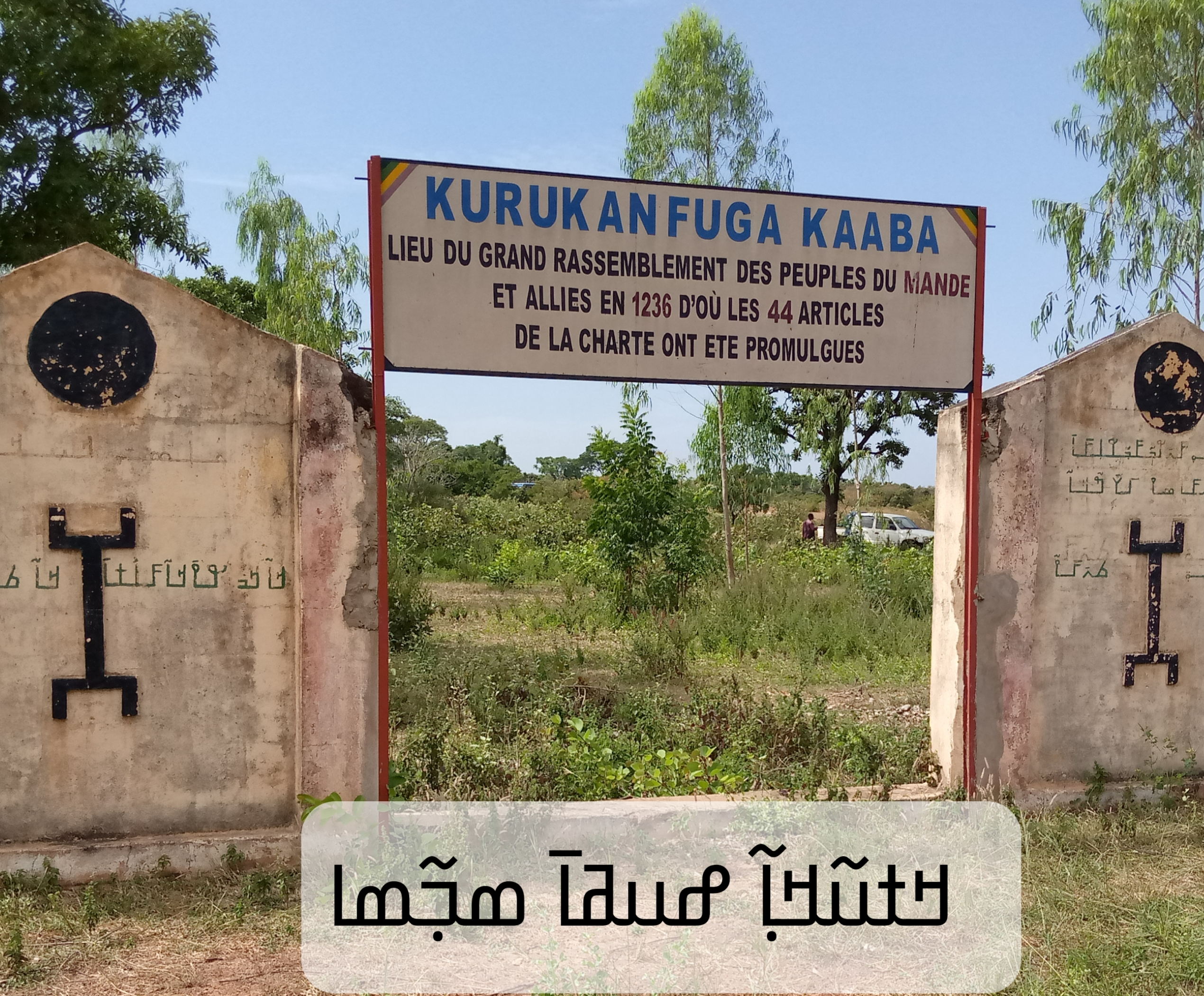
The door of the Kouroukan Fouga, in actual Kangaba, in Mali

Kouroukan Fouga, or Kurukan Fuga, was the constitution of the Mali Empire created after the Battle of Krina (1235) by an assembly of nobles to create a government for the newly established empire, according to the Epic of Sundiata. According to oral tradition of the jelis of Mali and Guinea, the Kouroukan Fouga established the federation of Mandinka clans under one government, outlined how it would operate and established the laws by which the people would live. The name Kurukan Fuga is a toponym, translating to "clearing on granite/lateritic rock", referring to the plain near where the narrative has Sundiata Keita present the charter. This is often claimed to have been near the town of Ka-ba (present day Kangaba), following the interpretation of Djibril Tamsir Niane, but other scholars have argued that oral histories more commonly place the event at nearby Dakajalan.

The "Manden Charter, proclaimed in Kurukan Fuga", was inscribed in 2009 (4.COM) on the Representative List of the Intangible Cultural Heritage of Humanity kept by UNESCO.

== Reconstruction ==
The earliest extant versions of the Epic of Sundiata were collected in the 1890s, and the first close transcription dates to 1967. As an instance of oral history, the epic does not exist in a fixed form.

An attempt to "reconstruct" the Kouroukan Fouga from oral tradition was made in 1998, in a regional workshop held in Kankan, Guinea, with the aim of publishing and preserving the oral history related to the area's djeli or griots. Assisted by modern communicators and Guinea linguists under the supervision of Siriman Kouyaté, the workshop transcribed and translated the laws and edicts preserved in different regions from the core of the Mali Empire.

This was one of the first faithful transpositions of oral legend into European tradition inspired writing. Djibril Tamsir Niane in an interview went as far as claiming the reconstruction was a "declaration on the rights of man" drafted "in 1236".

The English version of the charter was re-published by Mangoné Niang, Director of CELTHO/UA (Niamey), with a short commentary prepared by Siriman Kouyaté, as an annex to the "Working Documents" for the "Inter-generational Forum on Endogenous Governance in West Africa" organised by Sahel and West Africa Club / OECD in Ouagadougou, Burkina Faso, from 26 to 28 June 2006. According Niang's introduction, it states: "The traditionists are those who [recited] the text; then it has been transcribed and translated, with the help of Guinea linguists and under the supervision of Mr. Siriman Kouyaté – Magistrate and traditionist (his family is guardian of the Sosobala, in Niagasole, Guinea). Afterwards S. Kouyaté structured The Charter, without falsifying the essential point, talking here about the modern juridical texts with a view to make it readable for contemporaries". Niang lists ten "traditional communicators" on whose authority the text was reconstructed. Siriman Kouyaté, the author of the reconstruction, is listed as one of the ten authorities. Niang adds that "the original text in Malinke is available on the digital data bank ARTO". The ten sources are listed as follows:

- Siaka Kouyaté, Niagassola, Siguiri (Guinea),
- Lamine Kouyaté, Loïla, Mandiana (Guinea),
- Damissa Sékou Diabaté, Siguiri (Guinea),
- Koulako Touré, Faranah (Guinea),
- Mamady Kante dit Konkoba, Dinguiraye (Guinea),
- Old Koita, Kérouané (Guinea),
- Sekouba Condé, Dabola (Guinea),
- E. Oumar Camara, Kankan (Guinea),
- Abdoulaye Kanouté, Tambakounda (Senegal),
- Siriman Kouyaté, Niagassola, Siguiri (Guinea).

== Contents ==
The reconstructed Kouroukan Fouga, as published by Kouyaté, contains 44 edicts. They are divided into four sections concerned with Social Organization (edicts 1-30), Property Rights (edicts 31-36), Environmental Protection (edicts 37-39) and Personal Responsibilities (edicts 40-44).

The Kouroukan Fouga divided the new empire into ruling clans (lineages) that were represented at a great assembly called the Gbara. There were 16 clans known as the Djon-Tan-Nor-Woro (quiver carriers) responsible for leading and defending the empire. There were also 4 clans known as the Mori-Kanda-Lolou (guardians of the faith) who guided the ruling clans in matters of Islamic law. There were 4 nyamakala clans (people of caste) who had the monopoly on certain trades, which included but was not limited to smelting, woodworking, and tanners. Lastly, there were 4 clans of djeli (masters of speech) who recorded the history of the empire through song. Combined these would make up the 29 seat Gbara at the plain of Kouroukan Fougan (named after the event where Sundiata "divided the world"). The 30th seat was likely occupied by the mansa's djeli called the belen-tigui (master of ceremonies), or may have been reserved for a female monitor since the constitution states women are to be represented at all levels of government (edict 16).

Article 7 institutes the sanankuya (a type of cousinage or joking relationship that is a longstanding West African social tradition) as a civic duty.

Kouyaté in his commentary draws attention to paragraph 20, dealing with the humane treatment of slaves, which states: Paragraph 20 states: "Do not ill treat the slaves. You should allow them to rest one day per week and to end their working day at a reasonable time. You are the master of the slaves but not of the bag they carry."

=== Social Organization ===
- Article 1: The Great Mande Society is divided into sixteen clans of quiver carriers, five clans of marabouts, four groups of "nyamakalas" and one group of slaves. Each one has a specific activity and role.
- Article 2: The "nyamakalas" must devote themselves to tell the truth to the chiefs, to be their counsellors and to defend by the speech the established rulers and the order upon the whole territory.
- Article 3: The five clans of marabouts are our teachers and our educators in Islam. Everyone has to hold them in respect and consideration.
- Article 4: The society is divided into age groups. Those born during a period of three years in succession belong to the same age-group. The members of the intermediary class between young and old people, should be invited to take part in the making of important decisions concerning the society.
- Article 5: Everybody has a right to life and to the preservation of physical integrity. Accordingly, any attempt to deprive one's fellow being of life is punished with death.
- Article 6: To win the battle of prosperity, the general system of supervision has been established to fight against laziness and idleness.
- Article 7: The sanankunya (joking relationship) and the tanamannyonya (blood pact) have been established among the Mandinka people. Consequently, any contention that occurs among these groups should not degenerate the respect for one another being the rule. Between brothers-in-law and sisters-in-law, between grandparents and grandchildren, tolerance should be the principle.
- Article 8: The Keïta family is nominated reigning family upon the empire.
- Article 9: Children's education behooves the entire society. The paternal authority in consequence falls to everyone.
- Article 10: We should offer condolences mutually.
- Article 11: When your wife or your child runs away, stop running after them in the neighbour's house.
- Article 12: The succession being patrilinear, never relinquish power to a son when one of his father's brothers is still alive. Never relinquish power to a minor just because he has goods.
- Article 13: Never offend the Nyaras (the talented).
- Article 14: Never offend women, our mothers.
- Article 15: Never beat a married woman before her husband has tried to correct the problem.
- Article 16: Women, apart from their everyday occupations, should be associated with all our managements.
- Article 17: Lies that have lived for 40 years should be considered like truths.
- Article 18: We should respect the law of primogeniture.
- Article 19: Any man has two parents-in-law: We have to hold them in respect and consideration.
- Article 20: Do not ill treat the slaves. We are the master of the slave but not the bag he carries.
- Article 21: Do not follow up with your constant attentions the wives of the chief, of the neighbor, of the marabout, of the priest, of the friend and of the partner.
- Article 22: Vanity is the sign of weakness and humility the sign of greatness.
- Article 23: Never betray one another. Respect your word of honor.
- Article 24: In Manden, do not maltreat the foreigners.
- Article 25: The ambassador does not risk anything in Manden.
- Article 26: The bull confided to your care should not lead the cattle-pen.
- Article 27: A girl can be given in marriage as soon as she is pubescent without age determination.
- Article 28: A young man can marry at age 20.
- Article 29: The bride-dowry is fixed at 3 cows: one for the girl, two for the father and mother.
- Article 30: In Mande, divorce is tolerated for one of the following reasons: the impotence of the husband, the madness of one of the spouses, the husband's incapability of assuming the obligations due to the marriage. The divorce should occur out of the village. (The French version published in 1998 does not include this article, but splits article 34 into two, numbering the intervening articles differently).
- Article 31: We should help those who are in need.

=== Of Goods ===
- Article 32: There are five ways to acquire property: buying, donation, exchange, work and inheriting. Any other form without convincing testimony is doubtful.
- Article 33: Any object found without a known owner becomes common property only after four years.
- Article 34: The fourth heifer born is the property of the guardian of the heifer. One egg out of four is the property of the guardian of the laying hen.
- Article 35: One bovine should be exchanged for four sheep or four goats.
- Article 36: To satisfy one's hunger is not robbery if you don't take away anything in your bag or your pocket.

=== Preservation of Nature ===
- Article 37: Fakombè is nominated chief of hunters.
- Article 38: Before setting fire to the bush, don't look down at the ground, raise your head in the direction of the top of the trees to see whether they bear fruits or flowers.
- Article 39: Domestic animals should be tied during cultivation and freed after the harvest. The dog, the cat, the duck and the poultry are not bound by the measure.

=== Final Disposals ===
- Article 40: Respect kinship, marriage and the neighborhood.
- Article 41: You can kill the enemy, but not humiliate him.
- Article 42: In big assemblies, be satisfied with your lawful representatives.
- Article 43: Balla Fassèkè Kouyaté is nominated chief of ceremonies and main mediator in Manden. He is allowed to joke with all groups, in priority with the royal family.
- Article 44: All those who will transgress these rules will be punished. Everyone is bound to make effective their implementation.

== UNESCO listing ==
Prompted by the publication of the Kouroukan Fouga, in 2003 Malian historian Youssouf Tata Cisse published the "Hunter's Oath", supposedly sworn by Sundiata's troops upon his coronation in the capital Dakadjalan. The Malian government soon began promoting the historicity and importance of this oath, an entirely different document from the Kouroukan Fouga charter, and submitted it to UNESCO for inclusion on its list of Intangible Cultural Heritage of Humanity. In 2009 UNESCO duly listed the "Manden Charter, proclaimed in Kurukan Fuga", but the description of the charter clearly referred to the entirely separate "Hunter's Oath". In October 2009 the Malian government newspaper celebrated the listing as a victory for the country over neighbors coveting Mali's cultural heritage.

== Interpretation ==
=== Historical significance ===
According to Nick Nesbitt (2014) of Princeton University, the Mande Charter is a non-tribal, modern, universalist human rights charter created in 1222. As a universal human rights charter of African modernity, Nesbitt indicates that it predates the universal human rights charters of European modernity (e.g., Spinoza, Kant, French Revolution, Age of Enlightenment, Declaration of the Rights of the Man and of the Citizen of 1793) by hundreds of years.

In comparison to the Magna Carta, Capitulatio de partibus Saxoniae, and Code Noir, Nesbitt indicates that the Mande Charter is an axiom, without grounding, universalist, vitalist (e.g., soul, spirit), and egalitarian, which states: “Every life is a life” – as in, “Every life is one life.” As an axiom, Nesbitt indicates content (e.g., race, gender, wealth, language, class, or any other form of entitlement) of inequality is absent from it; rather, content of equality is present – every individual human life is valued equally.

In contrast to negative formulations (e.g., “Thou shalt not” in the Hebrew Bible), Nesbitt indicates that the basis for the modernity found in the Mande Charter, as a universal human rights charter that is also deductive and systematic, is its positive formulation, which expresses intent to establish an ideal realm rooted in fraternity, equality, freedom, and justice. Nesbitt indicates that its principles of universal human rights are drawn from a foundational concept of human dignity.

Amid an enslavement system that was introduced along with Islam, and predating the declarations of 1776 and 1789, Nesbitt indicates that the Mande Charter was the earliest declaration to seek abolition of enslavement, beyond moral assertion, through the establishment of an emancipatory government.

=== Criticism ===
Historian Francis Simonis has observed that the Kankan workshop did not invite any Malian griots, perhaps due to a perceived rivalry between Mali and Guinea over claims to the legacy of the Mali Empire. The resulting text, not coincidentally, emphasizes the importance of the Kouyate family, who organized the meeting. Jan Jansen takes this one step further, labeling both the Kouroukan Fouga and the Hunters' Oath acts of historical "bricolage" (essentially 'DIY') and recent invention rather than credible documents. Simonis and Jansen also see the widespread acceptance and historicization of the documents as potentially alienating to non-Mande citizens of both Mali and Guinea.

== Bibliography ==
- Cissé, Youssouf Tata (2003). La charte du Mandé et autres traditions du Mali. Paris: Albin Michel. p. 64 Pages. ISBN 2-226-13736-X.
- Jansen, Jan (2016). "À la recherche d autochtonie Pourquoi les Maliens acceptent la Charte du Manding et la Charte de Kouroukanfougan". Mande Studies. 18: 57–73.
- Ki-Zerbo, J & D.T. Nianie (1998). UNESCO General History of Africa, Vol. IV: Africa from the Twelfth to the Sixteenth Century (Abridged ed.). Berkeley: University of California Press. p. 277 Pages. ISBN 0-520-06699-5.
- Mangoné Niang, The KURUKAN FUGA Charter: An example of an Endogenous Governance Mechanism for Conflict Prevention, Inter-generational Forum on Endogenous Governance in West Africa, 2006
- Simonis, Francis (2015). "Le griot, l'historien, le chasseur et l'UNESCO". Ultramarine. 28: 12–31.
