= Amy Koita =

Malian singer (born 1952)

- Born: 1952 (age 73–74); Djoliba, Mandé, Kati Cercle, French Sudan
- Occupation: Singer
- Years active: 1970s–1990s
- Style: Traditional Mandinga
- Relatives: Wa Kamissoko (uncle)

Amy Koita (also spelled Ami; born 1952 in Djoliba) is a Malian singer. She is nicknamed "the diva of Mandinga music".

== Biography ==
Koita was born in Djoliba, a village in the center-west of the French Sudan (present-day Mali), 40 kilometres (25 mi) southwest of Bamako, in the heart of sent deep in the banks of the Niger River and a few hours walk from Guinea. Her family had a long tradition of yelis (i.e. griots: bards, poets and street narrators), in the Mandinga culture (and within it, the Bambara).

Her mother came from Kirimadon de la magna, the site of the famous battle of Emperor Sundiata Keita (1190–1255) in the 13th century. Her father, Bengaly Fode Koita, a pure-line traditionalist, was well known in Mali for his contribution to narrating the events of the historical kings, such as Sundiata Keita, and of the different battles waged by warlords, like Samori Ture (1830–1900), Babemba Traoré (king of Sikasso), Tiramakhan Traoré, Fakoly Dumbia (13th century) and Omar Saidou Tall.

Both her father and her mother were griots. Her father, to save the life of the old chief of the Djoliba village, vowed that if the chief died, he would never sing again in his life. Thus, Koita never heard her father sing, and he died when she was three years old. On the death of her father, she moved to Bamako with her mother, but always maintained a close bond with Djoliba.

Her grandmother, who died over the age of 100 in 1992, was a constant source of inspiration and a model of Mandinga culture. Her uncle, Wa Kamissoko, brother of her mother, was a historian of international fame for having written about the history of the Mandingas, and was published under the title Les grandes gestes du Mali ("the great deeds of Mali") by Youssouf Tata Cissé. From her mother, she learned how to sing and how to make vocal fluctuations important to griot tradition. From her grandmother, she learned behavior, sensitivity and respect for tradition. From her uncle, Wa Kamissoko, she learned the stories of her people, without deformations.

== Discography ==
- Bomboli Niaré (1976)
- Néné Daou (1978)
- Amy Koita (1985) LP SP 1001
- Tata Sira (1986) CD Mélodie 42079-2
- Nakan (1988) CD Mali Stars Mélodie 38115-2
- Mamaya (1989) CD Mélodie 38120-2
- Mory Djo (1989)
- Djamba Kono (1992)
- Songs of praise (1993) Stern's Africa STCD 1039
- Carthage (1995) CD Sonodisc CDS 6840
- Djiguy (1998) CD Déclic 8459132
- Sarama (2000) K7 SA-SN 0012
- Africawé (2003)
