= Balla Fasséké =

Figure in Malian myth

In the ancient African oral tradition of the Epic of Sundjata, Balla Fasséké is Sundiata Keita's jeli (griot). King Naré Maghann Konaté offered his son Sundiata a jeli, Balla Fasséké, to advise him in his reign. He would go on to serve as the ancestor of the Kouyate dynasty of Malinke griots.

Griots were the "present each king gives his successor", they were the aristocratic oral historians that attended kings, recording and recalling the legacies of kings and kingdoms. Griots have existed "since time immemorial," or as long as "Kouyates have been in the service of the Keita princes of Mali."

== History ==
In the Epic of Sundjata, the king, Naré Maghann Konaté, is the son of a long lineage of hunters distinguished because of their skill, bravery, and ability to communicate with the guardian spirits who ruled over Mali in the 13th century. A hunter comes to him with a prophecy that two hunters would come to the king with a very ugly woman whom he must marry, as she would bear him Mali's greatest king ever. This prophecy does come true, and two hunters arrive with a hunchback woman named Sogolon Kedju. The hunters explain that she is the human double of a buffalo.

King Maghan and Sogolon soon conceive a child, named Sundiata. However, Maghan's first wife, Sassouma Berete, was jealous, and had hoped her own son, Dankaran Touman, would be the heir to the throne. Later, Sassouma is relieved when the new child turned out to be lame, gluttonous and ugly. Dying, King Maghan gives Balla Fasséké, the son of the king's own jeli, to Sundjata as a gift, still honoring the prophecy.

Sassouma now has taken control of the throne, and insults Sogolon and her son often. One day, when Sogolon cries from these insults, Sundjata says, "Cheer up, Mother. I am going to walk today." Sundjata, with the help of an iron rod, is able to lift himself up. Sundjata is now a threat to the false king Dankaran and his mother. Sassouma, in response to this, sends Balla Fasséké and Sundjata's half sister Nana to the sorcerer king Soumaoro Kante, of the Sosso, who had been threatening all of the kingdoms with his growing army.

== See also ==
- Griot
- Mali Empire
- Keita Dynasty
