= Dozens (game) =

Two-player insults battle of African American origin

The Dozens is a game played between two contestants in which the participants insult each other until one of them gives up. Common in African American communities, the Dozens is almost exclusively played in front of an audience, who encourage the participants to reply with increasingly severe insults in order to heighten the tension and consequently make the contest more interesting to watch.

Comments in the game may focus on the opposite player's intelligence, appearance, competency, social status, and financial situation. Disparaging remarks about the other player's family members are common, especially regarding their mother. Commentary is often related to sexual issues, and this version of the game is referred to as the "Dirty Dozens".

According to sociologist Harry Lefever and journalist John Leland, the game is played almost entirely by African-Americans; other ethnic groups often fail to understand how to play the game and can take remarks in the Dozens seriously. (Note: Although folklorists have observed some white adolescent boys engaging in a form of the Dozens, a black psychologist wrote in 1970 that white psychologists' deconstruction of the apparent hostility in the Dozens is misunderstood because the white psychologists take the insults literally (Lefever). John Leland uses the example of boxer Muhammad Ali, who often used the Dozens format in banter with reporters, either confusing or angering them when he did. (Leland, p. 182)) Its popularity is higher among low-income and urban communities, but it is also found in middle-class and rural settings. Both men and women participate, but the game is more commonly played among men.

== Terminology ==
Playing the Dozens is also known as:

- "biddin'"
- "blazing"
- "capping"
- "checking"
- "clowning"
- "crumming"
- "frying"
- "hiking"
- "jiving", while the insults themselves are known as "snaps".
- "jocin'"
- "joning"
- "roasting"
- "ragging"
- "ranking"
- "ribbing"
- "rekking"
- "scoring"
- "sigging"
- "signifying"
- “skinning”
- "sounding"
- "woofing"
- "wolfing"

== Origins ==
=== Etymology ===
The term dozens has long been debated as to its etymology, with urban legend abounding. The first academic treatment of the Dozens was made in 1939 by Yale-based psychologist and social theorist John Dollard, who described the importance of the game among African-American men, and how it is generally played. Dollard's description is considered pioneering and accurate. Dollard originally wrote that he was unaware of how the term dozens developed, although he suggested a popular twelve-part rhyme may have been the reason for its name. He only speculated on how the game itself grew to such prominence. Online Etymology Dictionary claims the origin, first attested in 1928, is probably from bulldoze, in the original sense of 'a beating or thrashing'.

Other authors following Dollard have added their theories; author John Leland describes an etymology, writing that the term is a modern dialectal survival of an English verb —to dozen— dating back to at least the 14th century and meaning 'to stun, stupefy, daze' or 'to make insensible, torpid, powerless'.

Author and professor Mona Lisa Saloy theorizes a different etymology in "African American Oral Traditions in Louisiana" (1998):

The dozens has its origins in the slave trade of New Orleans where deformed slaves—generally slaves punished with mutilation for disobedience—were grouped in lots of a 'cheap dozen' for sale to slave owners. For a Black to be sold as part of the 'dozens' was the lowest blow possible.

=== Anthropology ===
Amuzie Chimezie, writing in the Journal of Black Studies in 1976, connects the Dozens to a Nigerian game called Ikocha Nkocha, literally translated as 'making disparaging remarks'. This form of the game is played by children and adolescents, and takes place in the evening, in the presence of parents and siblings. Commentary among the Igbo is more restrained: remarks about family members are rare, and are based more in fanciful imaginings than participants' actual traits. In contrast, during the game in Ghana, which is also commonly played in the evenings, insults are frequently directed at family members.

Amiri Baraka independently concluded that the Dozens originated in Africa and states that they are a surviving adaptation of "African songs of recrimination."

== Purpose and practice ==
The Dozens is a "pattern of interactive insult" evident among all classes of African Americans, among men and women, children and adults. Usually two participants engage in banter, but always in front of others, who incite the participants to continue the game by making the insults worse. Frequently used topics among players who "play the Dozens" or are "put in the Dozens" are one's opponent's lack of intelligence, ugliness, alleged homosexuality, alleged incest, cowardice, poor hygiene, and exaggerations of physical defects, such as crossed eyes.

Participants in the Dozens are required to exhibit mental acuity and proficiency with words. In his memoir Die Nigger Die! (1969), H. Rap Brown writes that the children he grew up with employed the Dozens to kill time and stave off boredom, in the way that whites might play Scrabble. Brown asserts playing the game is a form of mental exercise. Sociologist Harry Lefever states that verbal skill and wit is just as valued among African Americans as physical strength: "Verbal facility is thus a criterion that is used to separate the men from the boys". According to author John Leland, the object of the game is to stupefy and daze one's opponents with swift and skillful speech. The meaning of the words, however, is lost in the game. The object of the game is the performance.

Adolescents incorporate more sexual themes in their versions, often called the "Dirty Dozens". The language also becomes more playful, with participants including rhymes:

I was walking through the jungle
With my dick in my hand
I was the baddest motherfucker
In the jungle land
I looked up in the tree
And what did I see
Your little black mama
Trying to piss on me
I picked up a rock
And hit her in the cock
And knocked that bitch
About a half a block.

Many forms of the Dozens address sexual situations or body parts:

If you wanta play the Dozens
Play them fast.
I'll tell you how many bull-dogs
Your mammy had.
She didn't have one;
She didn't have two;
She had nine damned dozens
And then she had you.

== Analysis ==
A variety of explanations have been offered for the popularity of the Dozens. Its development is intertwined with the oppression African Americans encountered, first as slaves and later as second-class citizens.

John Dollard viewed the Dozens as a manifestation of frustration aggression theory, a theory that he helped develop. He hypothesized that African Americans, as victims of racism, have been unable to respond in kind towards their oppressors, and instead shifted their anger to friends and neighbors, as displayed in the strings of insults. Folklorist Alan Dundes asserted that an approach based on psychoanalytic theory and American oppression ignores the possibility that the Dozens may be native to Africa. In addition to similar forms of verbal combat found in Nigeria and Ghana, where many African Americans have ancestral roots, Bantu and Kisii boys have been observed dueling verbally by attacking each other's mothers.

The game is also viewed as a tool for preparing young African Americans to cope with verbal abuse without becoming enraged. The ability to remain composed during the Dozens is considered a hallmark of virtue among many African Americans.

In the deepest sense, the essence of the dozens lies not in the insults but in the response of the victim. Taking umbrage is considered an infantile response. Maturity and sophistication bring the capability to suffer the vile talk with aplomb at least, and, hopefully, with grace and wit.

Nonetheless, many such contests do end in fights. Abrahams states that when African Americans reach a certain age, between 16 and 26, the game loses much of its appeal and attempts to enter into sparring contests often result in violence. John Leland writes that the loser of the Dozens is the one who takes his opponent's words at face value, therefore ending his own performance in the back-and-forth exchange.

== In popular culture ==
"Playing the Dozens" is referenced in Zora Neale Hurston's 1937 novel Their Eyes Were Watching God, where Janie, the protagonist, returns her husband's insults with some of her own. "Playing the dozens" and "signifying" are also frequently referenced in Alston Anderson's 1959 short story collection Lover Man. The sketch comedy show In Living Color featured a skit called "The Dirty Dozens" prominently featuring Jamie Foxx.

== See also ==
- Joking relationship
- Battle rap
- Black Twitter
- Call and response
- Diss track
- Freestyle rap
  - Cipher
- I Am the Greatest
- Mother insult
- Roast (comedy)
- Signifyin'
- Trash-talk
- "Say Man" – a 1959 recording by Bo Diddley that consists of a Dozens session set to music
- "Ya Mama", another musical Dozens session featured on the 1992 album Bizarre Ride II the Pharcyde

=== International ===
- Regueifa – Galicia
- Sanankuya – West Africa, especially Mande, Mandinka peoples
- Extempo – Trinidad and Tobago
- Flyting – Ancient, Medieval, and Modern Celtic, Anglo-Saxon and Medieval England, and Norse
- Senna - Norse
- Ta mère – France
- Bertsolaritza – Basque Country (oral poetic improvisation in Basque, one of the most famous popular manifestations of the Basque Country)

== Footnotes ==
=== Bibliography ===
- Dollard, John (1973). "The Dozens: Dialectic of Insult", in Dundes, Alan (ed. and preface), Mother Wit from the Laughing Barrel, University Press of Mississippi. pp. 277–294. ISBN 978-0-87805-478-7
- Leland, John (2005). Hip: The History, HarperCollins. ISBN 978-0-06-052818-8
- Wald, Elijah (2012). The Dozens: A History of Rap's Mama, Oxford University Press. ISBN 0-19-989540-6
