= Naré Maghann Konaté =

12th-century monarch

Naré Maghann Konaté was a 12th-century faama (king) of the Mandinka chiefdom (Kafo) of Kiri, in what is today Mali. He was the father of Sundiata Keita, founder of the Mali Empire, and a character in the oral tradition of the Epic of Sundiata.

== The Epic of Sundiata ==
In the Epic of Sundiata, Naré Maghann Konaté (also called Farako Manko Farakonken, Maghan Kon Fatta or Maghan the Handsome) was a Mandinka king who one day received a divine hunter at his court. The hunter predicted that if Konaté married an ugly woman, she would give him a son who would one day be a mighty king. Naré Maghann Konaté was already married to Sassouma Bereté and had a son by her, Dankaran Touman Keïta. However, when two Traoré hunters from the Dô kingdom presented him an ugly, hunchbacked woman named Sogolon Condé, he remembered the prophecy and married her. She soon gave birth to a son, Sundiata, who was unable to walk throughout most of his childhood until 7 years old (other sources say 10 years old).

After Naré Maghann Konaté's death (c. 1218), his first son, Dankaran Toumani Keita, assumed the throne despite Konaté's wishes that the prophecy be respected. Sundiata nonetheless overcame both his handicap and his brother's scorn to eventually defeat the Sosso invader Soumaoro Kanté, thus ensuring the Mandinka's dominance over the region in the form of the Mali Empire.

== See also ==
- Mali Empire
- Keita Dynasty
- History of Mali
