= Méma =

Region and former country in present-day Mali

- 8th century CE–c. 1450
- Status: Kingdom
- Common languages: Soninke language
- Religion: African traditional religions, Islam
- Government: Monarchy
- History
  - Established: 8th century CE
  - Independence from Mali: 1433
  - Conquest by the Songhai: c. 1450
Succeeded by
Songhai Empire

Méma is a region and former state in Mali, Africa, a key constituent kingdom in the Wagadou, Mali and Songhai Empires.

== Description ==
A plain of alluvial deposits, Méma is situated north of Massina, west of Lake Debo and the Inner Niger Delta, and southwest of the Lakes Region. The now-senescent basin may have been the first settlement area for communities who migrated from distressed homelands of the Sahara during the last two millennia BC.

== History ==
Méma was inhabited by 3800 BCE at the earliest by migrants from Azawad fleeing the drying Sahara. It was host to a large number of Stone Age villages, succeeded by hundreds of Iron Age cities, far pre-dating the settlement of Djenne-Jeno.

Historically, Méma was one of the smaller Soninke states, an important vassal or province of the Wagadou Empire. According to local legends it was founded by Biranin Tounkara, a slave or companion of Dinga, the legendary founder of Wagadou. Historian Dierk Lange has argued that Ghana, rather than being situated to the northwest of the Niger Delta, was in fact centered in the Méma area.

After Wagadou's collapse around the end of the 12th century, Méma was one of the most important Soninke successor states. It appears several times in the Epic of Sundiata. The Tunkara (king) of Mema shelters Sundiata when he flees the Manding region, then provides cavalry to help him overthrow Soumaoro Kante and establish the Mali Empire, within which Mema held a special, more autonomous status. In 1433 the kingdom regained its independence before falling to the Songhai Empire by the middle of the century.

== Archaeology ==
=== Toladié ===
Toladié, which dates between at least 430 CE and 670 CE, is the largest occupation site (76 hectares) in Mema. As a primary center in the region, Toladié utilized smelted iron tools produced by the communities of Akumbu, Boubou, Boundou, Boulel, Kobadie, Kolima, and Nampala for purposes of tribute and trade with the Ghana Empire.

=== Akumbu ===
At the Akumbu mound complex, in Mema, its archaeological findings date between 400 CE and 1400 CE; at the cultural deposit of AK3, which contained three human remains, the dates range between 400 CE and 600 CE. While two out of three human remains were in a fully decomposed state, one of the human remains were able to be determined to be a young adult (17–25 years old) female, who was buried with two copper bracelets - one on each wrist, 13 cowrie shells, 11 stone beads, and a fully intact pot.
