= Wa Kamissoko =

Malian traditional griot (1925–1976)

- Born: 1925; Krina, French Sudan
- Died: 1976 (aged 50–51); Dankan Koroni, Guinea
- Occupation: Griot

Wa Kamissoko (1925, Krina, Mali – 1976, Dankan Koroni, Guinea) was a Malian traditionalist griot (a keeper of oral tradition).

== Biography ==
Born into a community of traditionalist griots charged with perpetuating the memory of the Battle of Kirina and of the Mali Empire founded in its aftermath, he had acquired a profound knowledge of Mandinka oral tradition.

Following his meeting in April 1957 with the Malian ethnologist Youssouf Tata Cissé, the two men formed a close friendship, and Wa chose to become Cissé's personal griot. Having become aware of the griot's erudition, Youssouf Tata Cissé decided to undertake, together with him, a systematic exploration of Mandinka tradition, beginning with that of the Mali Empire. This collaboration allowed a substantial deepening of knowledge about the history of the great empires of West Africa and the great Mandinka epics, such as the Epic of Sundiata.

In January 1975 and February 1976 he took part in the colloquia on oral tradition held in Bamako by the Fondation SCOA pour la promotion de la recherche scientifique en Afrique Noire (now ARSAN), where he was questioned on various subjects by a panel of historians and Africanists of many origins.

One of the halls of the Bamako International Conference Centre has been named after Wa Kamissoko.

== Works ==
Wa Kamissoko could neither read nor write. His accounts were recorded by Youssouf Tata Cissé, who cross-checked them against one another and against those of other traditionalists in order to identify their constant elements.

- La grande geste du Mali, 2000, Karthala-ARSAN, ISBN 2865372065, ISBN 2865373266.
- Soundiata ou la gloire du Mali, 1991, Karthala-ARSAN, ISBN 2-811-10261-2.

== Bamako colloquia ==
- Actes du premier colloque de Bamako de 1975, 1975, ARSAN;
- Actes du deuxième colloque de Bamako de 1976, 1977, ARSAN.

== See also ==
- Manden Charter
- Mali Empire
