= Sanankuya =

West African social concept

Sanankuya (also sanankou(n)ya, sinankun, senenkun, senankuya) refers to a social characteristic present especially among the Manding peoples as well as many West African societies in general, often described in English with terms such as "cousinage" or "joking relationship".

In addition to sanankuya relationships that are pre-established between certain ethnic or professional clans, a sanankuya relationship can also be established between any two willing participants who have "broken the ice". Those in a sanankuya relationship may treat one another as if cousins or close family members with whom familiar jokes or humorous insults are exchanged. It is considered an essential element of Mande/West African society. Sanankuya was reputedly ordained as a civic duty in the Kurukan Fuga, the oral constitution of the Mali Empire, by Sundiata Keita in c. 1236.

This complex and longstanding custom in West African society is thought to survive in African-American culture in such cultural practices as "the Dozens," or trading warm insults. In addition, the custom of non-blood relatives according each other the status of familial relationships ("play" aunts, cousins, etc.) may be derived from this custom.

The Traoré and Koné clans each maintain a sanankuya relationship with the others' members. One of their biggest running jokes is that each clan will accuse the other of loving to eat beans the most.

== See also ==
- Fadenya
