= Suzy Platiel =

Algerian-born French ethnolinguist and Africanist (1930–2024)

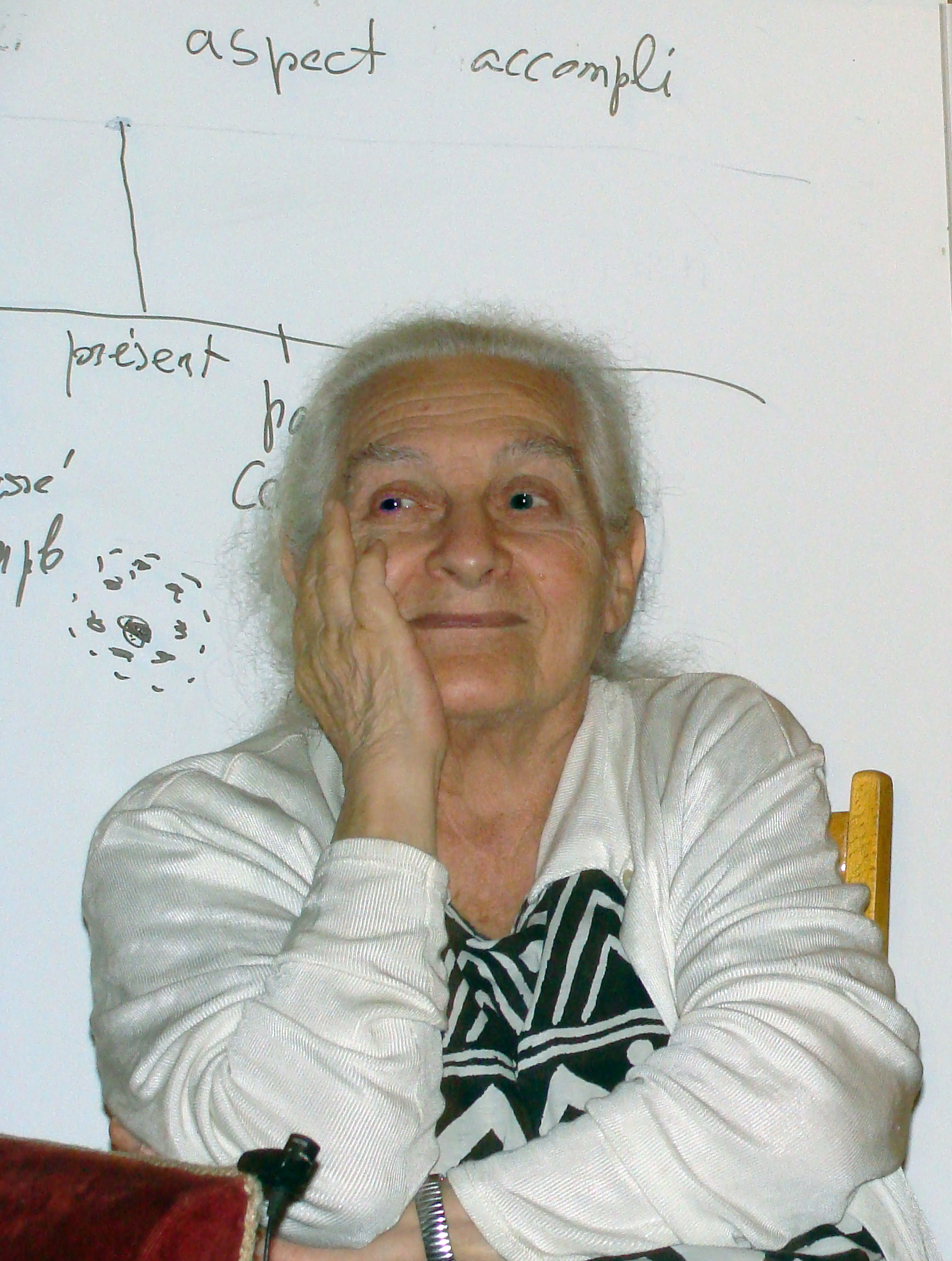
- Platiel in 2015
- Born: Suzanne Andrei Nelly Benguigui; 8 July 1930; Mascara, French Algeria
- Died: 3 March 2024 (aged 93); Paris, France
- Occupations: Ethnolinguist; Africanist
- Spouse: Roger Platiel (m. 1960-1974; divorced)

Suzanne Andrei Nelly Benguigui Platiel (8 July 1930 – 3 March 2024) was an Algerian-born French ethnolinguist and Africanist from the French National Centre for Scientific Research.

== Biography ==
Suzanne Andrei Nelly Benguigui was born in Mascara, Algeria on 8 July 1930, to a Jewish family. During World War II, she took an interest in ethnology. She earned a diploma in ethnology and linguistics at the age of 31. She met artist Roger Platiel in Paris in 1956, whom she married in 1960. The couple explored French Upper Volta together before separating in 1972 and divorcing in 1974.

Platiel began her professional experience spending one year in Rome. She studied the languages of the Sanan in the southern Manding region, whose population lacked a writing system or schools. She was hired as a linguist by the Ministry of National Education to transcribe a Senufo alphabet, grammar, syntax, and a dictionary. She was first helped by a teenage interpreter who had learned French from Catholic missionaries, before having to learn the language herself. However, French was eventually chosen as the language of instruction in schools despite her efforts.

Platiel wrote down tales told by the Sanan people, totalling over 300, particularly those told during dry season, which had previously only been passed down orally. Among the 327 stories she collected, 45 were published by Armand Colin in 1984.

In the 1980s, Platiel decided to host a "story hour" every week in the Paris suburbs. She was invited back multiple times to speak at the Lycée Buffon. Literary teacher Jean-Christophe Gary was inspired by Platiel's work and recorded some of her stories in his podcast. This led to the creation of the "Les Histoires de Suzy Platiel – Plaidoyer pour le conte" podcast on Radio France on 13 March 2013.

In 2013, the Centre méditerranéen de littérature orale set up a reflection group aimed at promoting direct communication in education with Platiel. In 2017, she became a teacher at the Conservatoire contemporain de littérature orale. In June 2017, she founded the collective "Les histoires à la bouche avec Suzy Platiel", which assembled storytellers working in schools based on her storytelling circles.

In 2011, Laurence Bellon credited Platiel in a postscript in L’atelier du juge. À propos de la justice des mineurs.

In January 2019, Platiel donated her research work to the Embassy of Burkina Faso in France. That month, she received a state doctorate in a ceremony organized by the embassy in the presence of Burkinabè ambassador to France Alain Francis Gustave Ilboudo, Deputy Permanent Delegate of Burkina Faso to UNESCO Sabine Bakyono, and Minister of Culture, Arts and Tourism Abdoul Karim Sango.

Suzy Platiel died in Paris on 3 March 2024, at the age of 93. She was buried on 8 March at the Cemetery of Alfortville.

== Bibliography ==
=== Books ===
- Esquisse d'une étude du Musey (1968)
- Questionnaires thématiques, Enquête et description des langues à tradition orale (1971)
- Histoires d'enfants terribles (Afrique noire): étude et anthologie (1980)
- Dialectologie et comparatisme en Afrique noire : Actes des journées d'étude tenues au Centre de recherche pluridisciplinaire du CNRS : Ivry, France, 2-5 juin 1980 (1980)

=== Tales ===
- Des animaux et des hommes : contes sanan de Haute-Volta (1983)
- La fille volage & autres contes du pays san présentés et traduits par Suzanne Platiel (1984)
- Contes sanan du Burkina Faso : La fille caillou (2004)

=== Articles ===
- "L'enfant, sujet et objet du conte (Sanan-Haute-Volta)" (1981)
- "À l'école du conte africain" (1984)
- "Le conte, lieu et source du discours : l'exemple de la société san" (1987)
- Le renouveau du conte (1991)
- "L'enfant face au conte" (1993)
- "Vitalité du conte : à l'école du conte oral, en Guyane. Ou comment s'appuyer sur la tradition orale pour développer la sociabilité et les structures mentales des enfants" (2010)
