= Dankaran Touman =

Manden king and son of Naré Maghann Konaté

Dankaran Touman (Manding languages: ߘߊ߲߬ߞߊ߬ߙߊ߲߬ ߕߎߡߊ߫ Dànkàràn Túmá) was the first son of Naré Maghann Konaté (father of Sundiata Keita, founder and first Emperor of the Mali Empire in the 13th century) in the Malian epic of Sundiata. He was also the King of Manden before the establishment of the Mali Empire.

== History ==
In the story, Dankaran persecuted his paternal half-brother Mansa Sundiata Keita. After Naré's death, Dankaran and his mother Sassouma Bereté plotted to kill Sundiata Keita because they feared that Sundiata would take the throne. To protect her children, Sogolon Conde (mother of Sundiata) abandoned the country with her children and lived in exile. Mandinka oral tradition suggests that the future greatness of Sundiata as a king was prophesied well in advance of his birth. Sogolon lived in exile with her children for several years. During their time in exile, the Sosso king Soumaoro Kanté invaded their country (Niani). Fearing for his life, Dankaran abandoned his subjects and left the country. Messengers were sent by the Mandinka elders to go and look for Sundiata so that he could come back and help liberate the Mandinkah people and their country from the Sosso King. His victory at the Battle of Kirina led to the foundation of the Mali Empire.
