= Kafo =

Historical form of political organization in Mande societies

The Kafo or Kafu was one of the most basic political units of Mande society in the pre-colonial period. It was a confederation of villages headed by a hereditary chief or kafo-tigi.

== Structure ==
In Mandinka society the lu (extended family) is the basic unit, and is led by a fa (family head) who manages relations with other fa. A dugu (village) is formed by a collection of lu, and the dugu is led by the fa of the most important lu, aided by the dugu-tigi (village head or fa of the first lu that settled there). A group of dugu-tigi form a kafu. The Keita clan initially held the status of kafu-tigi before Sundiata's expansion and the creation of the title mansa for the ruler of the Mali Empire.

== Kafo-tigi ==
The kafo-tigi was generally the head of the first family established on the land. Their primary role was to protect the kafo and its people from foreign invasion and enforce the laws. While their power was supreme in theory, in reality it was constrained by the dugu-tigi of the other villages and the heads of important families and caste groups.

== Examples ==
- Kangaba
- Bamako
- Dô
