= Niagassola =

Niagassola ߢߊ߰ߛߏ߬ߟߊ߫ (N’ko) Nyasola (romanized)
- Sub-prefecture and town
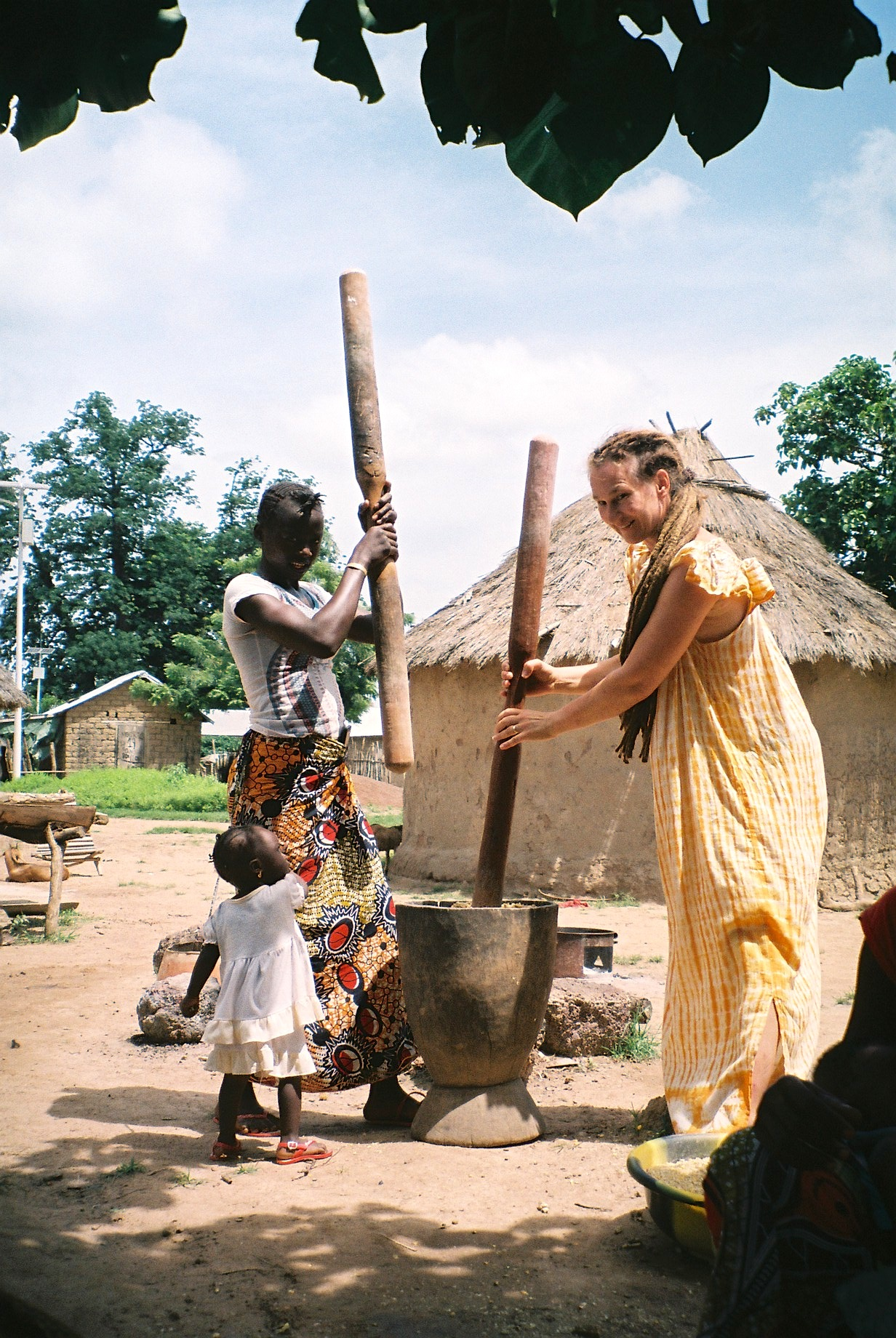

- Location in Guinea
- Coordinates: 12°19′N 9°07′W
- Country: Guinea
- Region: Kankan Region
- Prefecture: Siguiri Prefecture
- Founded: c. 1810
- Time zone: UTC+0 (GMT)

Niagassola is a town and sub-prefecture in the Siguiri Prefecture in the Kankan Region of north-eastern Guinea. It is located near the border with Mali. It has no electricity and three water pumps.

== History ==
Niagassola and its surroundings were, according to some oral traditions, the site of Dakadjalan, the capital of Naré Maghann Konaté and boyhood home of Sundiata Keita, founder of the Mali Empire.

Niagassola was preceded by a city called Waranban, which was mentioned by Mungo Park after his visit to the area in the late 18th century. It was located on a key slave-trading route linking Kangaba to the Atlantic coast, where they would be sold to European or American slavers. Founded around 1810, Niagassola was one of the principal cities of the Manding region after the decline of the Mali Empire, sometimes allied with and other times fighting against Kangaba. This rivalry continued in the early colonial period, with Niagassola given preferential treatment by the French.

== Culture ==
The town is the home of the world's oldest balafon and an important object for the Mandinka people, the 13th century Sosso-Bala, which has been labeled as a Masterpiece of the Oral and Intangible Heritage of Humanity by UNESCO.
