= Koyaka =

Mandinka people of West Africa

The Koyaka are a Mandinka people from West Africa established in central Côte d'Ivoire, mainly around the town of Mankono, in the Béré region.

== Ethnonymy ==
Depending on the sources and the context, there are several variants: Koyaa, Koyagakan, Koyaga, Koyakas, Koya, Koyara.

== Language ==
Their language is Koyaka (or Koyaga), a Manding language variety whose number of speakers was estimated at 84,000 in 2017.

== Notable people ==
- Ibrahim Coulibaly, Ivorian soldier who played a leading role in the 1999 putsch and the outbreak of the rebellion of September 2002 against the government of President Laurent Gbagbo.
- Hamed Bakayoko, born March 8, 1965, in Abidjan, was an Ivorian journalist and politician. A major player in the Ivorian political scene, he occupied various key ministries under Laurent Gbagbo and Alassane Ouattara. He was appointed Minister of State, Minister of Defense in 2017 in addition to having been elected mayor of Abobo, the most populous municipality of Côte d'Ivoire, in 2018.
- Amadou Soumahoro, born October 31, 1953, in Séguéla, in the Worodougou region, was an Ivorian statesman. Member of the Séguéla constituency, Soumahoro was made president of the National Assembly of Côte d'Ivoire in 2019 before his death in 2022. He was also the president of the Assemblée parlementaire de la Francophonie (APF).
- Youssouf Fofana ex-footballer

== Literature ==
- Alain-Michel Boyer, Les Wan, Mona et Koyaka de Côte d'Ivoire : le sacré, le secret, Fondation Culturelle Musée Barbier-Mueller, Hazan, Paris, 2011, 175 p. (ISBN 978-2-754-1055-14)
