= Faraba, Koulikoro =

Faraba
- Commune and village
- Location in Mali
- Coordinates: 11°54′22″N 8°8′45″W
- Country: Mali
- Region: Koulikoro Region
- Cercle: Kati Cercle

Area
  - Total: 502 km^{2} (194 sq mi)

Population (2009 census)
  - Total: 9,577
  - Density: 19.1/km^{2} (49.4/sq mi)
- Time zone: UTC+0 (GMT)

Faraba is a village and rural commune in the Cercle of Kati in the Koulikoro Region of south-western Mali. The commune contains 6 villages and in the 2009 census had a population of 9,577.
