= John Leland (journalist) =

American journalist and author (born 1959)

- Born: 1959 (age 65–66); New York City, U.S.
- Education: Columbia University (BA)
- Occupations: Author; journalist
- Employer: The New York Times

John Leland (born 1959) is an American author and has been a journalist for The New York Times since 2000. He began covering retirement and religion in January 2004. During 1994, Leland was editor-in-chief of Details magazine. He was also a senior editor at Newsweek, an editor and columnist at Spin magazine, and a reviewer for Trouser Press.

Leland wrote Hip: The History and Why Kerouac Matters: The Lessons of On the Road (They're Not What You Think). In 2018, his book Happiness is a Choice You Make was released.

== Education ==
He earned a Bachelor of Arts in English from Columbia College in 1981.

== Personal ==
According to biographical information from HarperCollins Publishers, Leland lives in Manhattan's East Village with his wife, Risa, and son, Jordan.

== Awards ==
Leland has won two awards from the National Association of Black Journalists.

== See also ==
- New Yorkers in journalism
