= Sassouma Bereté =

Sassouma Bereté (or Berete) was the first wife of the 13th century King of Mali Maghan Kon Fatta, the father of Sundiata Keita.

== Information Source ==
Everything that is known about Sassouma came from the Epic of Sundiata Keita (the first Emperor of the Mali Empire), passed down by Mandinka griots since the 13th century.

== Life ==
As the co-wife of Sogolon Condé, she is reported to have been very resentful of Sogolon, and used to humiliate her openly for giving birth to a deformed son (Sundiata Keita).

After the death of Naré Maghann, she feared that Sogolon's would usurp the throne of her own son, Dankaran Touman, and thus plotted with her son to kill Sundiata Keita.

Sogolon, fearing for the safety of her children, left Niani, and lived in exile with her children.

== Reputation ==
In the epic, Sassouma Bereté is regarded as "politically ambitious", and a "despised wife" who contravenes the social norms of Mande society.

However, she is also viewed as a rather strong woman, who have played a major role in her son's succession to the throne.
