= Joking relationship =

Form of banter

In anthropology, a joking relationship is a relationship between two people that involves a ritualised banter of teasing or mocking.

In Niger it is listed on the Representative List of the Intangible Cultural Heritage of Humanity.

== Structure ==
Analysed by British social anthropologist Alfred Radcliffe-Brown in 1940, it describes a kind of ritualised banter that takes place, for example between a man and his maternal mother-in-law in some South African indigenous societies. Two main variations are described: an asymmetrical relationship where one party is required to take no offence at constant teasing or mocking by the other, and a symmetrical relationship where each party makes fun at the other's expense.

The joking relationship is an interaction that mediates and stabilizes social relationships where there is tension, competition, or potential conflict, such as between in-laws and between clans and tribes.

Joking relationships can also exist between nations. Writing on the joking relationships between the Scandinavian countries, sociologist Peter Gundelach states, "Joking relationships are social relations where citizens of two nations tease one another by employing stereotypes. Therefore a joking relationship can only be established between nations that are somehow related to each other."

== Extent ==
While first documented academically by Radcliffe-Brown in the 1920s, this type of relationship is now understood to be very widespread across societies in general. In West Africa, particularly in Mali, it is regarded as a centuries-old cultural institution known as sanankuya.

Joking relationships existed among the Tio people (in Republic of Congo) between members of the opposite sex and same generation, and between grandmothers and grandchildren.

== Antithesis ==
This type of relationship contrasts strongly with societies where so-called avoidance speech or "mother-in-law" language is imposed to minimise interaction between the two parties, as in many Australian Aboriginal languages. Donald F. Thomson's article The Joking Relationship and Organized Obscenity in North Queensland gives an in-depth discussion of a number of societies where these two speech styles co-exist. The joking relationships which are most unconstrained and free are between classificatory Father's Father and Son's Son—which appears to be the same situation as in the Plains cultures of North America.

== See also ==
- Dozens (game) – Two-player insults battle of African American origin
- Ethnic joke – Joke based on assumptions about a specific ethnic group
