= Youssouf Tata Cissé =

Malian historian (1935–2013)

- Born: 4 March 1935; San, French Sudan
- Died: 10 December 2013 (aged 78); Paris, France
- Education: École pratique des hautes études
- Occupations: Ethnologist and historian
- Known for: Studies of the oral literature of Mali

Youssouf Tata Cissé (4 March 1935 – 10 December 2013) was a Malian ethnologist and historian, a specialist in the oral literature of Mali and the author of numerous works on the subject. He was a researcher at the Centre national de la recherche scientifique (CNRS) and taught at the Sorbonne.

== Biography ==
In 1973, at the École pratique des hautes études in Paris, he defended a doctoral thesis supervised by Germaine Dieterlen, entitled Un récit initiatique de chasse Boli-Nyanan. He devoted much of his life to the discovery, study and preservation of knowledge transmitted through oral tradition in West Africa, working in cooperation with Wa Kamissoko, a Malian nwâra (a specialist in traditions) and djali (griot).

== Works ==
- (with Germaine Dieterlen) Les Fondements de la société d'initiation du Komo, Paris–The Hague, Mouton et Cie (École pratique des hautes études, 6th section, Sciences économiques et sociales, Cahiers de l'homme, new series, no. 10), 1972.
- (with Wa Kamissoko) L'Empire du Mali. Un récit de Wâ Kamissoko de Krina ; enregistré, transcrit, traduit [du malinké] et annoté par Youssouf Tata Cissé, First International Colloquium of Bamako, 1975, Fondation SCOA pour la recherche scientifique en Afrique noire (projet Boucle du Niger), Paris, SCOA, 1975.
- (with Wa Kamissoko) L'Empire du Mali (2). L'enfance, l'exil, le testament et les funérailles de Maghan Sondyata, les Peuls du Manding. Un récit de Wa Kamissoko de Krina ; enregistré, transcrit, traduit [du malinké] et annoté par Youssouf Tata Cissé, Second International Colloquium of Bamako, 1976, Fondation SCOA pour la recherche scientifique en Afrique noire (projet Boucle du Niger), Paris, SCOA, 1977.
- (with Émile Leynaud) Paysans Malinké du Haut Niger : tradition et développement rural en Afrique Soudanaise, Mali, Imprimerie populaire du Mali, 1978.
- (with Wa Kamissoko) La grande geste du Mali. Des origines à la fondation de l'empire, Paris, Karthala-ARSAN, 1988 (2nd ed. 2007), ISBN 9782865372065.
- (with Wa Kamissoko) Soundiata ou la gloire du Mali, Paris, Karthala-ARSAN, 1991, ISBN 9782811102616.
- La confrérie des chasseurs Malinké et Bambara : mythes, rites et récits initiatiques, Nouvelles du Sud, Ivry; Agence de coopération culturelle et technique, Paris, 1994, 390 pp. ISBN 2-87931-038-5.
- (with André Magnin) Seydou Keïta, Zurich–Berlin–New York, Scalo, 1997.
- Tyiwara, Paris, Galerie Ratton-Hourdé, 2001.

== See also ==
- Manden Charter
- Mali Empire
- Dozo
