= Epic of Sundiata =

Epic poem of the Malinke culture

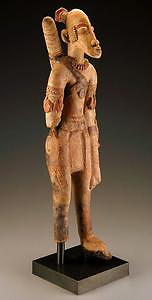
Terracotta archer figure from Mali (13th-15th century), with a quiver on his back. The bow and quiver of arrows were the symbols of power in Imperial Mali.

The Epic of Sundiata (/sʊnˈdʒɑːtə/; Manding languages: ߛߏ߲߬ߖߘߊ߬ Sònjàdà, also referred to as Sundiata or Son-Jara; Arabic: ملحمة سوندياتا; French: L'épopée de Soundjata) is an epic poem of the Malinke people that tells the story of Sundiata Keita, the founder of the Mali Empire in West Africa, who ruled from 1235 C.E. until his death in 1255 C.E. It details how Sundiata established the empire through strategic alliances and exceptional skill, and is structured as a Hero's journey. The epic is a foundational to Mandé culture and has been narrated for generations by Griots through oral tradition.

The epic is set in 13th century Mali and explores themes such as destiny, kinship, betrayal, resilience, and leadership. While there is no single authoritative version, fundamental components of the epic largely remain the same.

Versions of the epic first began to be "systematically" collected by European scholars, largely French or German, during the late 19th century in the colonized "French Sudan". Notable records by members of the French elite school École William Ponty, many of whom were themselves African, resulted in the "modern" version of the tale, based on the oral account by Djeli Mamoudou Kouyate, a jeli or traditional oral historian, translated into French by Djibril Tamsir Niane in 1960.

== Historical context and significance ==
=== Textual History ===
There are some limited 14th-century Arabic historiographic sources available on the early history and of the Mali Empire, notably the records of Ibn Khaldun. Therefore, the evidence of oral tradition may be critical in reconstructing the historical events of the period. Oral tradition necessarily undergoes significant changes over the course of several centuries, but scholars have nevertheless attempted to pinpoint elements in the epic that might reflect historical events.

Written summaries of the epic existed in Arabic before 1890. During the 1890s, versions of the epic were collected by French officials and published in French and German translation beginning in 1898. Western-educated West Africans began to produce literary versions of the tale beginning in the 1930s. This was notably the case at the French elite school, École William Ponty, which staged a drama based on the story in 1937. This period represents the first interaction of the oral tradition with "modern" literary traditions, and the transformations undergone by the narrative in the context of the 1937 presentation eventually resulted in the form of the epic which became most influential in the 1940s and 1950s, before an eventual "novelistic" treatment by Niane (1960). The first line-by-line transcription of the epic as told by a jeli was made in 1967.

=== Textual Significance ===
As an oral historical epic, Sundiata conveys information not only about the history of the Mali Empire, but also about the culture of the Mande ethnic group. Mande family structures had two elements—constructive (badenya) or destructive (fadenya). Fadenya, or "father-child-ness," is the rivalry between half-siblings, and is represented in the Sundiata epic by the animosity between Sundiata, son of Sogolon Condé, and Dankaran Touman, son of Sassouma (king Nare Marghan's first wife). The destructive forces of fadenya eventually cause Sundiata and his mother to be exiled from Mali, in the fear that Sassouma would hurt Sogolon's family. Badenya, or "mother-child-ness," is the affection between children of the same mother. This is represented in the epic by the support of Sundiata's sister, Kolonkan, in watching over him against Sassouma's attempts at witchcraft, and by his siblings' later support of him in his battle to reclaim Mali. Maternal support is also important for Sundiata to overcome his physical impairment and begin to walk in response to his mother's pleading. The importance of the mother is underscored by the narrator, who says "the child is worth no more than the mother is worth." Significantly, Sundiata needed both the opposing forces of fadenya and badenya to fulfill his destiny, indicating that both elements are necessary to Mande culture .

The Sundiata epic is still an integral part of Mande traditional culture and the story continues to be retold by jelis and through masked ritual performances. Today it has also become part of the official national mythology of the republics of Mali, Gambia, Senegal and Guinea and is studied in history lessons in primary school curricula.

== Plot ==
There is no single, authoritative version of the Sundiata epic, which could include over 40 episodes across all the known variants, but there are core, major components that are traditionally included. Bulman divides these components into:

1. paternal ancestry of Sundiata
2. buffalo-woman tale
3. birth and childhood of Sundiata
4. exile of Sundiata
5. return and war with Sumanguru

In Sundiata, Naré Maghann Konaté (also called Maghan Kon Fatta or Maghan the Handsome) was a Mandinka king who one day received a soothsaying hunter at his court. The hunter predicted that if Konaté married an ugly woman, she would give him a son who would one day be a mighty king. Naré Maghann Konaté was already married to Sassouma Bereté and had a son by her, Dankaran Toumani Keïta. However, when two Traoré hunters from the Dô kingdom presented him an ugly, hunchbacked woman named Sogolon, he remembered the prophecy and married her. She soon gave birth to a son, Sundiata Keita, who was unable to walk throughout his childhood. Sassouma was jealous of the child and mother and would make fun of Sundiata for his inability to walk and the ugliness he inherited from his mother. Despite his physical weakness, the king still granted Sundiata his own jeli at young age; this was in order to have them grow together and provide constant consultation as was the custom.

With the death of Naré Maghann Konaté (c. 1224), his first son, Dankaran Tuman, assumed the throne despite Konaté's wishes that the prophecy be respected. Sundiata and his mother, who now had given birth to two daughters and adopted a second son from Konaté's third wife Namandjé, suffered the scorn of the new king and his mother. After an insult against Sogolon, Sundiata requested an iron rod from the blacksmith Nounfari, which broke when he tried to use it in order to pull himself upright and walk. Only when he used a branch of S'ra (African baobab tree, Adansonian digitata) was he able to walk. In one version of the epic, Sundiata is able to walk after his father dies and his mother orders him to do so. He then becomes a great hunter. Nonetheless, the hatred of Sassouma Bereté and Dankaran Toumani Keita soon drove Sundiata, his mother, and his two sisters into exile in the Mema kingdom. (In one version of the epic, Sundiata and his mother are not exiled.) Sogolon feels that she and her son are in danger because of Sassouma's jealousy and left to keep them safe. Neighboring kingdoms are unwilling to harbor Sundiata and Sogolon in fear of what Sassouma and her son would do, but the Mema people take them in.

While living in the Mema kingdom, Sundiata began to grow "as strong as a lion", and he fought with the greatest general of the Mema people, Moussa Tounkara. Sundiata became such a great warrior to the degree that he was made heir to the Mema throne. However, Sogolon encouraged him to "fulfill his destiny" and return to Mali to become king.

Meanwhile, Soumaoro Kanté, a historical leader of the Sosso people who rose to prominence after the demise of the Ghana Empire but who is portrayed in the epic as a cruel sorcerer king, attacked the Mandinka kingdom, causing Dankaran Toumani to take flight in fear. Before reaching Mali, Soumaoro had conquered nine kingdoms in the former Ghana Empire. The oppressed Mandinka people then sent for the exiled Sundiata. Forging a coalition of neighboring small kingdoms, Sundiata waged a war against the Sosso. Finally, Sundiata was later crowned with the title "Mansa," or "king of kings", as the first ruler of the Mali Empire. He soon set about organizing the nucleus of the empire, presenting the Gbara of nobles and notables at his coronation with an oral constitution known as the Kouroukan Fouga. His model for government would guide the empire into greatness. Sundiata's exploits have even been compared to those of Alexander the Great by some jelis.

== Selected versions in English translation ==
- Mamadou Kouyaté (performer) & Djibril Tamsir Niane (novelization): Soundjata ou l'Epopée Mandingue (Paris: Présence Africaine, 1960). Trans. G.D. Pickett: Sundiata: An Epic of Old Mali, London: Longmans, 1965
- Bamba Suso, Banna Kanute and Dembo Kanute (performers) & Gordon Innes (editor): Sunjata: Three Mandinka Versions (University of London, 1974). Abridged version: Sunjata (Penguin, 1999).
- Babou Condé (performer) & Camara Laye (novelization): Le Maître de la parole (Paris: Plon, 1978). Trans. James Kirkup: The Guardian of the Word (1984).
- Fa-Digi Sisòkò (performer) & John William Johnson (editor): The Epic of Son-Jara: A West African Tradition (Indiana University Press, 1986). Third edition title: Son-Jara: The Mande Epic (2003).
- Djanka Tassey Condé (performer) & David C. Conrad (editor): Sunjata: A West African Epic of the Mande Peoples (Hackett, 2004). Reworked as Sunjata: A New Prose Version (Hackett, 2016).
- Issiaka Diakité-Kaba (playwright): Soundjata, Le Lion: Le jour oú la parole fut libérée / Sunjata, The Lion: The day when the spoken word was set free (Denver: Outskirts Press, 2010). French-English diglot dramatized version.

Stephen Bulman documents many more versions in "A Checklist of Published Versions of the Sunjata Epic". John William Johnson also compiled a bibliography online.

More recent academic works include:

- Bulman, Stephen; Belcher, Stephen; Vydrin, Valentin, eds. (3 August 2023). Corpus of Early Accounts of the Sunjata Epic, 1889-1959. British Academy. doi:10.5871/bacad/9780197267387.001.0001. ISBN 9780198910398.
- Conrad, David Courtney, ed. (29 August 2025). Great Sologon's House: Mande Epic from the Condé Bards of Fadama (Guinea). British Academy. ISBN 9781836245926.
