= Kangaba =

Kangaba Kaba
- Commune and town
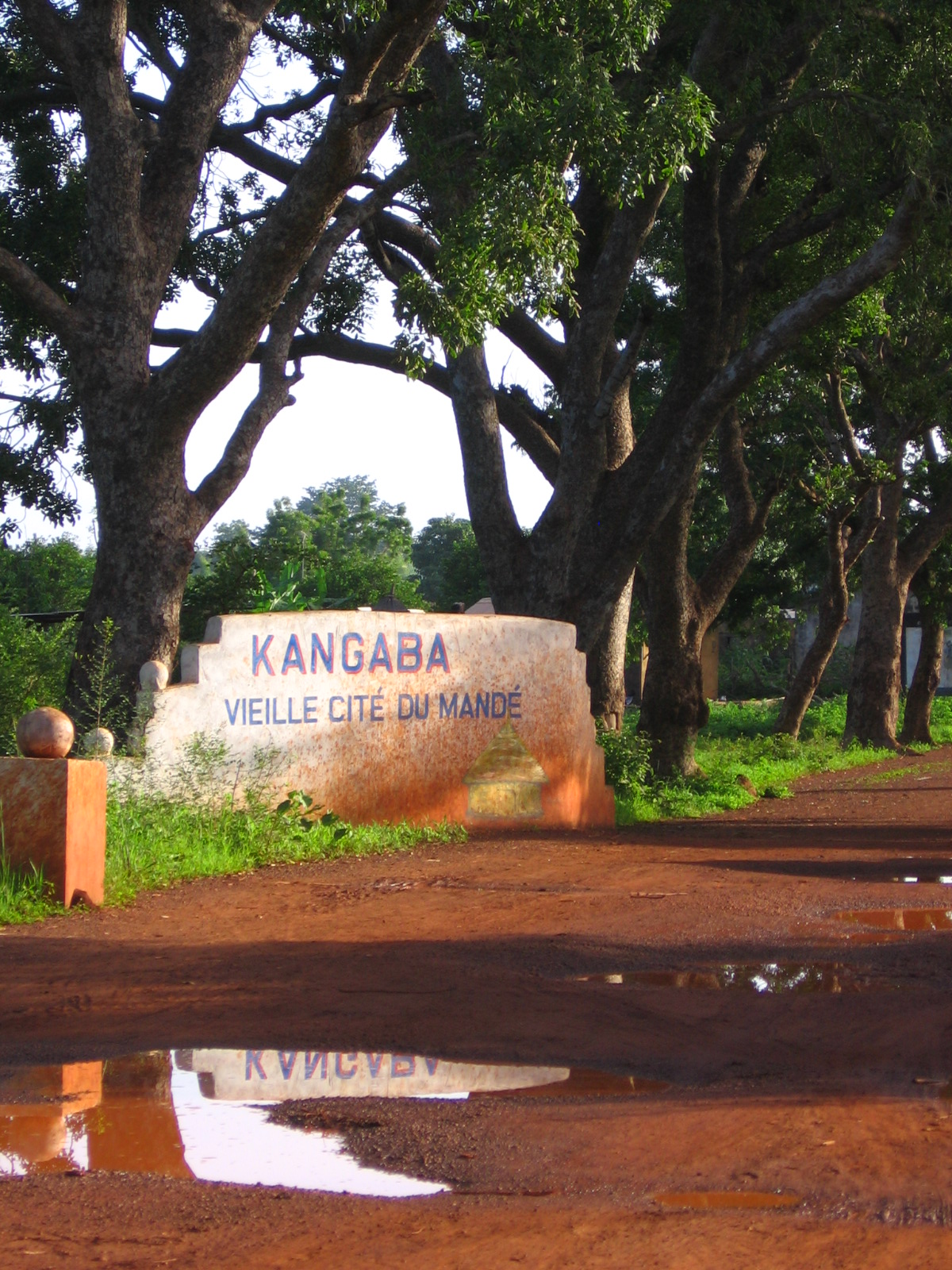
- Entrance to Kangaba

- Location in Mali Kangaba (Africa)
- Coordinates: 11°56′N 8°25′W
- Country: Mali
- Region: Koulikoro Region
- Cercle: Kangaba Cercle

Population
  - Total: 17,232
- Time zone: UTC+0 (GMT)

Kangaba is a town, commune, and seat of the Kangaba Cercle in the Koulikoro Region of south-western Mali.

Kangaba is believed to have been founded in 1050 by Mandinka tribesmen and was a vassal state of the Ghana Empire. Once known as Kaba, the area was a core province of the Mali Empire. After winning the Battle of Kirina in 1235, Sundiata Keita proclaimed the Manden Charter, also known as the Kouroukan Fouga after the field near Kangaba where it was created, perhaps the oldest constitution in the world. Ceremonies are still held in the town to honor the ancient traditions and promote a message of peace and fraternity.

The Kamablon is a sacred circular mudbrick building with a conical roof in the bara, or large public square, at the center of town, built in 1653. The oldest of its kind in the Manden cultural zone, its septennial re-roofing ceremony brings together the traditional castes, founding dynasties of the Mali Empire, and griots who recite the oral history and tradition of the region. This ceremony was listed on the Representative List of the Intangible Cultural Heritage of Humanity in 2009.

The relationship between Kangaba and the Keita clan is disputed. Some sources claim that the town was the boyhood home of Sundiata Keita and the first capital of the Mali Empire. The Keitas likely, however, only established a base there after the decline of the larger empire, and it thus became associated in popular imagination with the original legend.

== Capitals of the state of Kangaba (1050-1237) ==
- Kiki (1050-1090)
- Dodu (1090-1200)
- Kangaba (1200-1237)

== List of Kings of Kangaba ==
Names and Dates taken from John Stewart's African States and Rulers (2005).

- Taraore (c. 1050-1090)
- Baraonendana (c. 1090-1150)
- Hamama (c. 1150-1190)
- Di Jigi Bilali (c. 1190-1200)
- Keita Nari fa Majan (father of Sundiata Keita) (c. 1200-1218)
- Danagaram Tumo (half brother of Sundiata Keita) (c. 1218-1228)
- Soninke rule (1228-1230)
- Mari Jata I (also known as Sundiata Keita) (1230-c.1237)
