= Djibril Tamsir Niane =

Guinean writer and historian (1932–2021)

Djibril Tamsir Niane (9 January 1932 – 8 March 2021) was a Guinean historian, playwright, and short story writer.

== Biography ==
Born in Conakry, Guinea, his secondary education was in Senegal and his degree from the University of Bordeaux. He was an honorary professor of Howard University and the University of Tokyo. He is noted for introducing the Epic of Sundiata, about Sundiata Keita (ca. 1217–1255), founder of the Mali Empire, to the Western world in 1960 by translating the story told to him by Djeli Mamoudou Kouyate, a griot or traditional oral historian. He also edited Volume IV —Africa from the Twelfth to the Sixteenth Century— of the UNESCO General History of Africa and participated in other UNESCO projects. He was the father of the late model Katoucha Niane (1960–2008).

Niane died in Dakar, Senegal on 8 March 2021, at age 89, from COVID-19 during the COVID-19 pandemic in Senegal.

== Bibliography ==
- Recherches sur l'Empire du Mali au Moyen Age (D.E.S.), suivi de Mise en place des populations de la Haute-Guinée. Recherches Africaines, Conakry, 1959, 1960, 1961; Editions Présence Africaine, Paris, 1975.
- A propos de Koli Tenguella. Recherches africaines (Etudes guinéennes), nouv. sér., nos. 1 et 4 (oct.-déc.), 1959, 1960, pp. 35–46; 32–36.
- Djibril Tamsir Niane, Koly Tenguella et le Tekrour. Recherches africaines (Etudes guinéennes), nouv. sér., no. 1 (janv.-mars), 1969, pp. 58–68.
- Koly Tenghella et le Tekrour : Congrès des Africanistes, Présence Africaine, Paris, 1967
- Niani, l'ancienne capitale du Mali. Recherches Africaines, Conakry, 1968.
- Le cinéaste africain et l'histoire. Revue Présence Africaine, Paris 1974.
- Histoire et tradition historique du Manding. Revue Présence Africaine, Paris, 1974, no. 89 Vol. 1
- Les Traditions Orales Mandingues. Revue Présence Africaine, Paris 1975
- Le Soudan occidental au temps des Grands Empires. Présence Africaine, Paris 1975
- Co-président avec Amadou Hampaté Bâ de la série des colloques de la Fondation SCOA
- Colloque sur les Traditions Orales du Manding, 1975, Bamako I
- Colloque sur les Traditions Orales du Manding, 1976, Bamako II
- Colloque sur les Traditions Orales du Ghana, 1977, Niamey
- Les Traditions orales du Gabu. Revue Ethiopiques, Dakar 1980.
- L'Histoire générale de l'Afrique. Directeur de publication du volume IV : *L'Afrique du XIIème au XVIème siècles. Editions Jeune Afrique. UNESCO, Paris 1985
- Réalisation d'un Coffret Radiophonique “L'Epopée du Gabu”

Texts on the History of Kaabu

- Les Griots et la Musique historique, avec le concours de Radio France Internationale (Archives sonores de l'oralité, Paris 1987)
- Diverses communications scientifiques aux colloques et conférences sur l'histoire africaine, la Traite Négrière, etc.
- Histoire des Mandingues de l'Ouest. Paris. Karthala & Association ARSAN. 1989.
- Organisateur, sous l'égide de l'UNESCO, d'un Colloque sur les Traditions Orales et la Traite Négrière (Programme Route de l'Esclave)
- La Traite Négrière au Rio Pongo, 1999
- Résistance à la pénétration coloniale, 1972

Literature and theater

- Soundjata ou l'Epopée du Manding. Présence africaine, Paris, 1960. Ouvrage traduit en anglais, allemand, portugais, japonais, etc.
- Les Fiançailles tragiques ou légende du Wagadou Bida, interprété à Conakry en 1961, à Dakar au Théâtre national Daniel Sorano, 1967
- L'Avare de Molière, traduction en langue malinké, inteprété par les élèves du Lycée de Donka, à Conakry et à Kankan
- Sikasso ou la Dernière Citadelle, suivi de Chaka Oswald, Honfleur (France), 1971, inteprété par les étudiants de l'IPC en 1965, par la Troupe du Théâtre national Daniel Sorano, Dakar, 1976.
- Livret de Ballet “La Gazelle Noire”, interprété par la Troupe du Théâtre national Daniel Sorano
- Mery (nouvelles). NEA, Dakar 1975
- Contes d'hier et d'aujourd'hui. Paris, Présence Africaine, 1985
- Contes de Guinée. SAEC, Conakry 1993
- Histoire de la République de Guinée, SAEC, Conakry 1998
- Etat et société civile en Afrique noire, SAEC, Conakry 2000

Scholarly works

- Histoire de l'Afrique Occidentale en collaboration avec Jean Suret-Canale. Conakry 1960, Présence africaine 1961
- Histoire de l'Afrique (classe de 5è) en collaboration avec Amadou Mahtar M'Bow, Jean Devisse et Joseph Ki Zerbo, Hatier, Paris 1971
- Histoire de la Guinée (3è et 4è années), NEA, Dakar 1987
- Géographie de la Guinée. (3è et 4è années), Nathan, Paris 1987
- Géographie. (5è et 6è années), Nathan, Paris 1987
- Histoire de l'Afrique. (5è et 6è années), Nathan, Paris 1987
- Education civique. SAEC, Conakry 1994
- Mon beau pays la Guinée. SAEC, Conakry 1994
