= Soumaoro Kanté =

King of the Sosso people

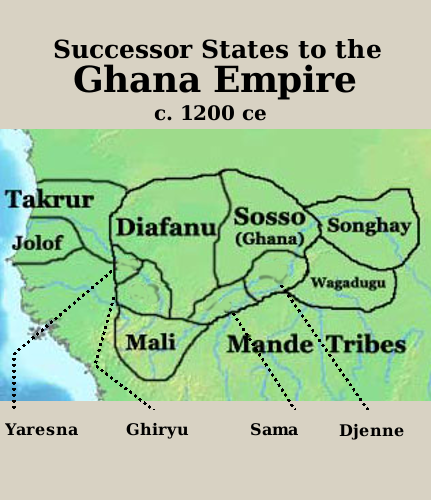

Soumaoro Kanté (also known as Sumaworo Kanté or Sumanguru Kanté) was a 13th-century king of the Sosso people. Seizing Koumbi Saleh, the capital of the recently defunct Ghana Empire, Soumaoro Kanté proceeded to conquer several neighboring states, including the Mandinka people in what is now Mali. However, the Mandinka prince Sundiata Keita built a coalition of smaller kingdoms to oppose him at the Battle of Kirina (c. 1235.), defeating the Sosso and leaving Sundiata's new Mali Empire dominant in the region.

Whether or not any of the deeds attributed to him actually happened as such, or even whether Kante existed at all, is debated by historians. Traditional oral histories provide a wide variety of information, some of which is contradictory and much that is obviously mythical.

== Biography ==
Soumaoro Kanté is portrayed as a villainous sorcerer-king in the national epic of Mali, the Epic of Sundiata. After his defeat at Kirina, he flees into the mountains of Koulikoro, where he "disappears" after being shot with the only weapon to which he is vulnerable - an arrow with a white rooster spur arrowhead. In the Epic of Sundiata, Soumaoro Kanté is described as owning a balafon with magical powers, which is stolen by Sundiata Keita's djeli, Balafasseke Kouyate, and brought to Manden. This is the origin of the Manden djeli tradition of balafon playing. The balafon of Soumaoro Kanté is said to be kept by the Kouyate family to this day in the village of Niagassola in Guinea.

Soumaoro is viewed as one of the true champions of Traditional African religion due to his reputation in the epic as someone possessing extraordinary magical powers. According to Fyle, Soumaoro was the inventor of the balafon and the dan (a four-string guitar used by the hunters and griots).

As evidence of his supernatural powers, the griot Lansine Diabate notes, "At that time, owing to his magical powers, every fly which rested on the balafon of Soso [the royal musician], Sumaworo was able to find it out from a cloud of flies to kill it." Diabate goes on to say that it was when the balafon player first refused to play for the king that Soumaoro Kanté's demise was anticipated.

== Bibliography ==
- Davidson, Basil. Africa in History. New York: Simon & Schuster, 1995.
- Charry, Eric. Mande Music: Traditional and Modern Music of the Maninka and Mandinka of Western Africa. Chicago: Chicago Studies in Ethnomusicology, 2000.
- Carruth, Gorton, The encyclopedia of world facts and dates, p 167, 1192 HarperCollins Publishers, 1993, ISBN 006270012X
- Stride, G. T & Ifeka, Caroline, Peoples and empires of West Africa: West Africa in history, 1000–1800, p 49, Africana Pub. Corp., 1971
- (in French) Editor: Senghor, Léopold Sédar, Éthiopiques, Issues 21-24, Grande imprimerie africaine, 1980, p 79
- Fyle, Magbaily, Introduction to the History of African Civilization: Precolonial Africa, University Press of America (1999), p. 61, ISBN 9780761814566
