= Dô =

Do Dugubani Dô
- Capital: Dugubani
- Common languages: Mandinka
- Religion: African traditional religion
- Government: Kafu
- Historical era: 11th-18th century
Preceded by	Succeeded by
Wagadu	Segou Empire
- Today part of: Mali

Dô, also spelled Daw, sometimes called Dodougou or Do Dugubani, was a kafu (a coalition of villages headed by a kafu-tigi) in the Niger River valley around the modern village of Tamani, west of Segou. It existed as early as the 11th century, and played a prominent role in the establishment of the Mali Empire: the founder Sundiata Keita's mother, Sogolon Condé, was from Dô.

Andalusian writer Al-Bakri records two countries, "Daw" and "Malal", located near the Niger and close to gold-fields. In al-Idrisi's account of 1154, he noted that the two towns of Daw and Malal were four days' travel apart, located in a river valley that joins the Nile (meaning the Niger River).

Oral sources also mention two kingdoms, Do and Kiri (also called Mande or Malel). Do was inhabited by the Conde clan, and had twelve towns under its control. After Malel is said to have brought unity, mention of Do ceases.

Some sources place the Do of the Sundiata story in the Sankaran region, west of Niani, rather than near Segou.
