= Sosso Empire =

12th century kingdom in West Africa

- c. 1200–c. 1235
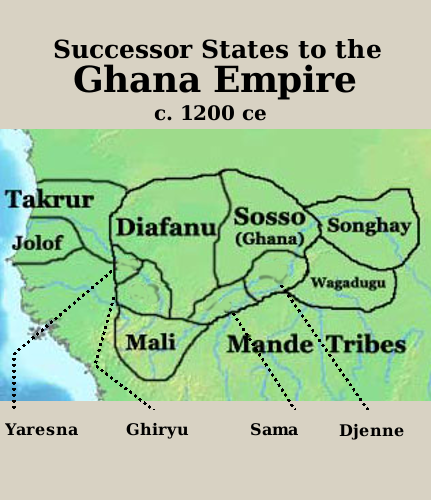
- Map of West Africa after the fall of Ghana to the Sosso
- Capital: Sosso
- Common languages: Soninke
- Religion: African traditional religion
- Government: Monarchy
  - c. 1200-1235: Soumaoro Kante
- History
  - Capture of Wagadu: c. 1200
  - Battle of Kirina: c. 1235
| Preceded by | Succeeded by |
| Ghana Empire | Mali Empire |
- Today part of: Mali

The Sosso Empire, also written as Soso or Susu, or alternatively Kaniaga, was a kingdom of West Africa that originated as a vassal of the Ghana Empire before breaking away and conquering their former overlords. Inhabited by the Soninke ancestors of the modern-day Sosso people, it was centered in the region south of Wagadou and north of Beledougou. The empire peaked under the reign of Soumaoro Kante, who was defeated by the rising Mali Empire of Sundiata Keita.

== Etymology ==
The term 'Sosso' may come from the word for horse, as the kingdom had a monopoly on the horse trade vis-a-vis its southern neighbors. The capital, a town of that name, still exists in Mali, near Boron in the Koulikoro Region. The empire is sometimes referred to Kaniaga, the Malinke name for the region where it appeared.

== Historiography ==
Oral histories, not to mention the Western written histories derived from them, can compress events and people from different periods into single narratives, obscuring the historical facts. There may have been multiple Kante kings who were responsible for the growth of the Sosso Empire, but only the name Soumaoro has been remembered, and so all the accomplishments are credited to him.

Colonial-era historian Maurice Delafosse asserted that Diarisso dynasty ruled Kaniaga until 1180, when a series of weak-willed and quarrelous brothers brought the kingdom to its knees through civil war until they were overthrown by a mercenary general, Kemoko or Diarra Kante, who gradually came to dominate the Soninke-inhabited southern provinces of Ghana and was father to Soumaoro Kante. This narrative has been repeated and enlarged upon by other historians since the early 20th century. It was, however, constructed by haphazardly mixing different oral traditions and inventing information to fill in gaps, and there is in fact no evidence that Diarra had any connection to Soumaoro Kante.

Historian Stephen Bühnen has argued that Sosso, rather than being located in Kaniaga south of Wagadu, was in fact centered in the Futa Jallon. This theory has not, however, been generally accepted by other Africanists, and is a minority position among griots, who have associated Sosso the empire with Sosso the village since the 1880s.

== History ==
The Sosso originated as a clan of slaves of the Kaya Magha of the Ghana Empire, part of the group of Kusa lineages, who gradually accumulated power, populating the royal bureaucracy and army, and serving as governors of provinces. Soumaoro was reputed to have been the head of all the royal slaves and a governor of a province in northern Beledougou.

=== Height of Power ===
Oral histories collected in Sokolo and Goumbou claim that the Diarrisso family ruled Wagadu at the time. A civil war between two groups of half-brothers over the succession broke out. Repeated conflict, including the intervention of a mercenary named Diarra, so weakened the state that it became easy prey for Soumaoro Kante, an event that Heinrich Barth dated to approximately 1203. A letter sent by Abu’l-Rabi, the Almohad governor of Sijilmasa, "to the king of the Sudàn in Ghàna" in 1199 refers to their difference in religion; this might reflect the dominance of the pagan Sosso.

He conquered Diarra and Gajaaga and subdued the Mandinka chieftaincies to the south, where the important goldfields of Bure were located. Dialonkadugu was also a Soso province.

Besides the capital of Sosso, four major cities have been remembered in oral history: Kukuba, Bantamba, Nyemi-Nyemi, and Kambasiga. Kukuba was Soumaoro Kante's personal fortress from which he waged war on the Manding chiefdoms to the south. Today known as Koulouba, the site, on a cliff overlooking Bamako, holds the presidential palace of Mali. Bantamba, the site of Soumaoro's 'war medicine' and fire oracle, is possibly the city of Banamba. Nyemi-Nyemi may refer to the city of Niamina, near the important ritual center of Niamanko where young blacksmiths were trained and initiated.

Soumaoro is remembered in Mande oral histories as a cruel, harsh leader. Many Soninke people left the region to escape his rule, and religious persecution drove Muslim traders to abandon Koumbi Saleh for Djenne and Oualata. He beheaded Muslim kings who opposed him.

At the Battle of Kirina (c. 1235) the Mandinka prince Sundiata Keita led a coalition of smaller states to soundly defeat the Sosso and kill Soumaoro. Sundiata marched on Sosso itself and destroyed it, marking the kingdom's end.

== Aftermath ==
When the Soso empire collapsed, the entire Kaniaga region was incorporated into Sundiata's Mali Empire. The resulting upheaval led to massive population movements, with the remains of the Sosso either moving west into Senegambia or south into the Futa Jallon, where they became the ancestors of the Susu and Yalunka peoples. The presence of some or all of these Mande peoples may, however, predate the Sosso Empire, and reflect a gradual process of emigration as the Ghana Empire expanded and warred rather than a single cataclysmic population shift.
