= Battle of Kirina =

Battle in Mali, c. 1235

Date	c. 1235
Location	Kirina in the Koulikoro Region, Mali 12.3063°N 8.1516°W
Result	Sundiata Keita's victory; Fall of Sosso
Territorial changes	Establishment of the Mali Empire

Belligerents
Sosso	Mandinka

Commanders and leaders
Sumanguru Kanté	Sundiata Keita

The Battle of Kirina, also known as the Battle of Krina or siege of Karina (c. 1235), was a confrontation between Sosso king Sumanguru Kanté and Mandinka prince Sundiata Keita. Sundiata Keita's forces roundly defeated those of Sumanguru Kanté, guaranteeing the pre-eminence of Keita's new Mali Empire over West Africa.

== Prelude ==
By the late twelfth century, the formerly dominant Ghana Empire had collapsed, following internal strife and political intervention of the Almoravids in the eleventh century. A number of smaller neighboring states rushed to fill the power void, including the Sosso people of the Kaniaga kingdom, and the Mandinka people of the Upper Niger. Under the leadership of Soumaro Kanté, the Sosso seized Koumbi Saleh, former capital of the Ghana Empire, and expanded outward, conquering the Mandinka among others.

== During the battle ==
The exiled Mandinka prince Sundiata Keita organized a coalition of smaller kingdoms to oppose the growing power of the Sosso. The opposing armies met in the Koulikoro Region of what is now Mali in about 1235. Sundiata Keita's forces were victorious, and marched on to raze Sosso. The date is often cited as the beginning of the Mali Empire, which would control most of West Africa for the next two centuries.

== Aftermath ==
The story of the battle is retold in the Epic of Sundiata, widely considered Mali's national epic. In it, Sumanguru Kanté is an evil sorcerer-king who oppresses the Mandinka people; however, when Sundiata discovers that his sacred animal is the rooster, he is able to wound Sumanguru Kanté with an arrow tipped by a cock's spur. The Sosso king then flees the field, disappearing into the Koulikoro mountains. A version of this story was recounted by Maximilien Quenum in his Légendes africaines.

== See also ==
- Mali Empire
- Military history of the Mali Empire
- Sundjata Keita
