= Sundiata Keita =

Founder and first ruler of the Mali Empire

- Founder and Emperor of Imperial Mali
- Reign: c. 1235 – c. 1255
- Coronation: Crowned Mansa after The Battle of Kirina: c. 1235
- Predecessor: Naré Maghann Konaté and Dankaran Touman both as Faamas (Kings in Mandinka language – pre-Imperial Mali. As a Mansa (King of Kings), preceded by none).
- Heir-apparent: Mansa Uli I
- Born: c. 1217; Dakadjalan, part of present-day Mali
- Died: c. 1255 (aged c. 37–38)
- Issue: Mansa Wali Keita; Mansa Ouati Keita; Mansa Khalifa Keita; Mansa Sundiata Keita also had daughters not just sons.
Names
- Mansa Sundiata Keita
- House: Keita
- Father: Naré Maghann Konaté
- Mother: Sukulung Conté
- Religion: Sunni Islam (nominal) Traditional African religion

Sundiata Keita (Mandinka, Malinke: [sʊndʒæta keɪta]; c. 1217 – c. 1255, N'Ko spelling: ߛߏ߲߬ߖߘߊ߬ ߞߋߕߊ߬; also known as Manding Diara, Lion of Mali, Sogolon Djata, son of Sogolon, Nare Maghan and Sogo Sogo Simbon Salaba) was a prince and founder of the Mali Empire. He was also the great-uncle of the Malian ruler Mansa Musa, who is regarded as the wealthiest person of all time, although there are no reliable ways to accurately calculate his wealth.

Written sources augment the Mande oral histories, with the Moroccan traveller Muhammad ibn Battúta (1304–1368) and the Tunisian historian Ibn Khaldun (1332–1406) both having travelled to Mali in the century after Sundiata's death, and providing independent verification of his existence. The semi-historical but legendary Epic of Sundiata by the Malinké/Maninka people centers on his life. The epic poem is primarily known through oral tradition, transmitted by generations of Maninka griots (djeli or jeliw). The Manden Charter issued during his reign is listed by UNESCO as one of an intangible cultural heritage.

== Epic of Sundiata ==
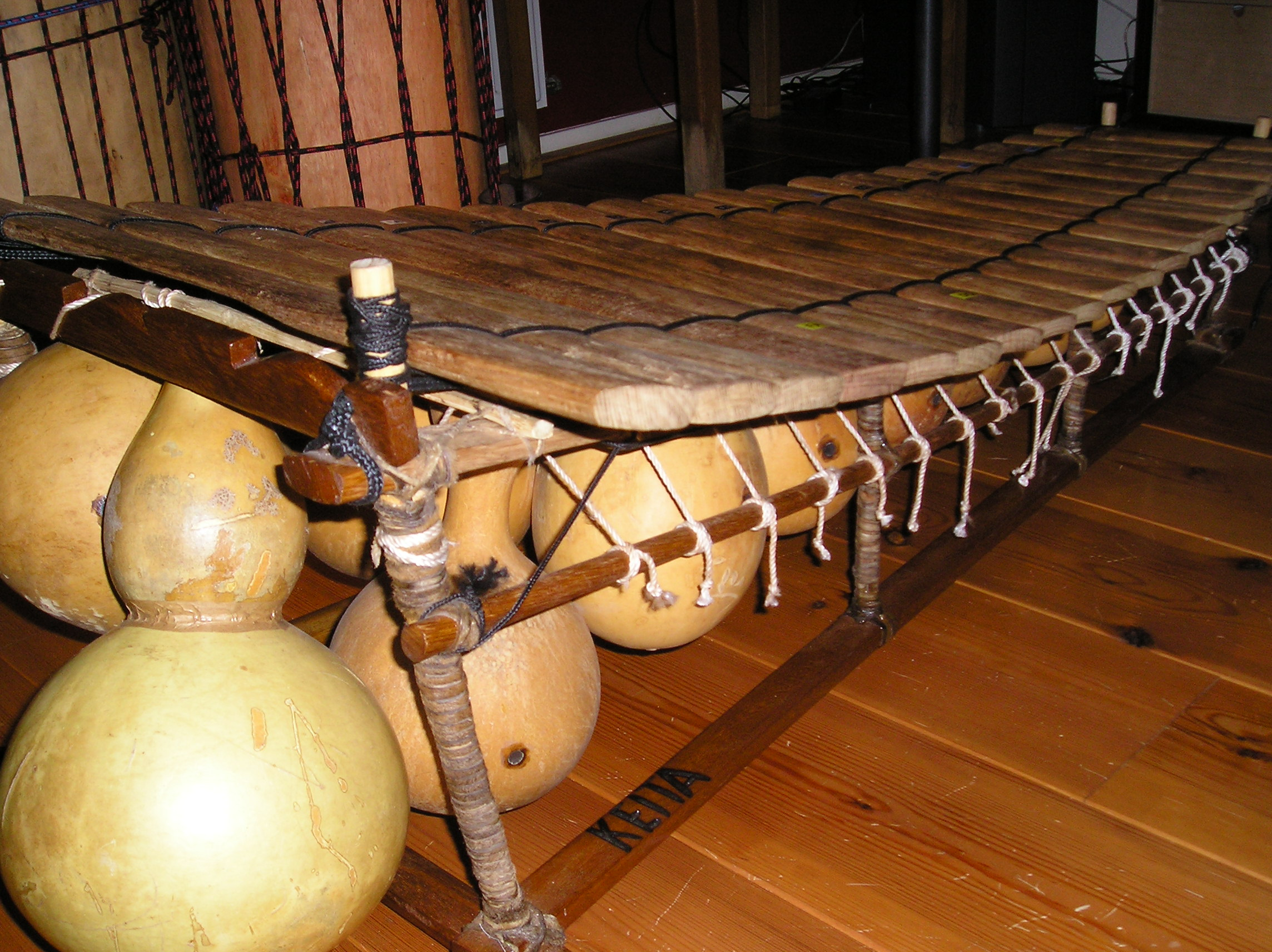
A modern balafon. The balafon plays an important role in the Epic of Sundiata. The magical balafon belonging to Soumaoro Kanté was stolen by Sundiata Keita's griot - Balla Fasséké and taken to Mandinka country.

The oral traditions relating to Sundiata Keita were passed down generation after generation by the local griots (djeli or jeliw), until eventually their stories were put into writing. Sundiata was the son of Naré Maghann Konaté (variation: Maghan Konfara) and Sogolon Condé (variations: "Sogolon Kolonkan" or "Sogolon Kédjou", the daughter of the "buffalo woman", so-called because of her ugliness and hunchback). Sundiata was crippled from childhood and his mother (Sogolon) was the subject of ridicule among her co-wives. She was constantly teased and ridiculed openly for her son's disability. This significantly affected Sundiata and he was determined to do everything he possibly could in order to walk like his peers. Through this determination, he one day miraculously got up and walked. Among his peers, he became a leader. His paternal half-brother, Dankaran Touman, and Dankaran's mother, Sassouma Bereté, were cruel and resentful of Sundiata and his mother. Their cruelty escalated after the death of Naré Maghann (the king and father of Sundiata). To escape persecution and threats on her son's life, Sogolon took her children, Sundiata and his sisters, into exile. This exile lasted for many years and took them to different countries within the Ghana Empire and eventually to Mema, where the king of Mema granted them asylum. Sundiata was admired by the King of Mema for his courage and tenacity. As such, he was given a senior position within the kingdom. When King Soumaoro Kanté of Sosso conquered the Mandinka people, messengers were sent to go and look for Sogolon and her children, as Sundiata was destined to be a great leader according to prophecy. Upon finding him in Mema, they persuaded him to come back in order to liberate the Mandinkas and their homeland. On his return, he was accompanied by an army given to him by the King of Mema. The warlords of Mali at the time who were his age group included: Tabon Wana, Kamadia Kamara (or Kamadia Camara), Faony Condé, Siara Kuman Konaté and Tiramakhan Traore (many variations: "Trimaghan" or "Tiramaghan", the future conqueror of Kaabu). It was on the plain of Siby (var: Sibi) where they formed a pact brotherhood in order to liberate their country and people from the powerful Sosso king. At The Battle of Kirina, Sundiata and his allies defeated the Sosso king, and he became the first Emperor of the Mali Empire. He was the first of the Mandinka line of kings to adopt the royal title Mansa (king or emperor in the Mandinka language).

The Mandinka epic does not give us dates, but Arab and North African writers who visited the area about a century after the epic's events documented on paper some of the information, including dates and a genealogy. Conversely, the written sources left out other pieces of information that the oral tradition includes.

- Sogolon Djata
- Sundjata Keyita
- Mari Djata or "Mārī-Djāta" (according to Ibn Khaldun in the late 14th century)
- The Lion King

The proper English spelling of Sundiata's name is Sunjata, pronounced soon-jah-ta, approaching the actual pronunciation in the original Mandinka. The name Sogolon derives from his mother and Jata means lion. It is the traditional way of praising someone in some West African societies (Gambia, Senegal, Mali and Guinea in particular). The name Sundiata praises him through his mother which means "the lion of Sogolon" or "Sogolon's lion". The name Jata derives from Jara (lion). Jara and many of its variations such as jata, jala or jada are merely regional variations, from Gambia, Guinea or Mali, for instance. Sundiata's name is thus a derivation of his mother's name Sogolon (Son or its variation Sun) and Jata (lion).

== Surname (Keita or Konaté?) ==
Some Bambaras and Mandinkas have proposed that the name Keita actually means inheritor (heir-apparent) in the Mandinka language, and that Sundiata's real surname is Konaté (French spelling in Mali) or Konateh, variations: Konate, Conateh (English spelling in the Gambia where the Mandinkas make up the largest ethnic group). It is proposed that Sundiata Keita's father, Naré Maghann Konaté, took the real family name Konaté while his successors were "Keitas in waiting" (heirs to the throne). The name Keita is a clan name rather than a surname. Although in some West African societies a clan can be similar to the family name (see Joof family), such similarities do not exist between the names Keita and Konaté. Both points of contention agree that Keita is not a real surname, but rather a royal name, in spite of the fact that Sundiata is referred to as Sundiata Keita in many scholarly works. At present, there is no consensus among the scholars regarding the name Sundiata Konaté.

== Battle of Kirina ==
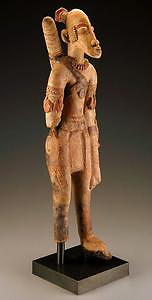
Terracotta archer figure from Mali (13th-15th century), with a quiver on his back. The bow and quiver of arrows were the symbols of power in Imperial Mali.

French ethnographer Maurice Delafosse previously proposed that Soumaoro Kanté's grandfather, with the help of his army and the Sosso nobility of Kaniaga, captured what was left of the sacked Ghana Empire and by 1180, Diara Kanté (var: Jara Kante), Soumaoro's father, gained control of Koumbi Saleh, dethroned a Muslim dynasty and continued the Diarisso Dynasty (variation: Jariso or Jarisso) whose son (Soumaoro) went on to succeed him and launched an offensive against the Mandinkas. Delafosse's original work has been refuted and discarded by many scholars including Monteil, Cornevin, etc. There was no Diara Kanté in the oral sources. That was an addition by Delafosee which was contrary to the original sources. The consensus is, in c. 1235, Sundiata who had survived one of Soumaoro's earlier raids went to war with the help of his allies against King Soumaoro of Sosso. Although a valiant warrior, Soumaoro was defeated at The Battle of Kirina (c. 1235). Soumaoro is regarded as one of the true champions of the Traditional African religion. According to Fyle, Soumaoro was the inventor of the balafon and the dan (a four-string guitar used by the hunters and griots). After his victory at Kirina, Sundiata took control of the former conquered states of the Sosso and appropriated privileges among those who participated in the defeat of Soumaoro. The former allies of Soumaoro were also later defeated, in particular the king of Jolof. Serer oral tradition speaks of a Serer king of Jolof, involved in the occult (just as Soumaoro), who was later defeated by Tiramakhan Traore (one of the generals of Sundiata) after Sundiata sent his men to buy horses in Jolof. It is reported that, when Sundiata sent his men to Jolof to buy horses in a caravan loaded with gold, the king of Jolof took all the gold and horses – known among some as "the robbery of the horses". In a revenge attack, Sundiata sent his general to Jolof to assassinate the king. It is believed that, it was probably this king of Jolof (known as Mansa Jolofing or Jolofing Mansa) who sided with Soumaoro at The Battle of Kirina and possibly belongs to the Ngom Dynasty of Jolof, the predecessors of the Diaw and Ndiaye Dynasties of Jolof. At present, little is known about the Ngom Dynasty of Jolof.

Niane has advanced the claim that, the Jolofing Mansa sided with Sumaguru [or Soumaoro] because "like him, he was hostile to Islam." He went on to state that:

"He [the King of Jolof] confiscated Diata's [Sundiata's] horses and sent him a skin, saying that he should make shoes out of it since he was neither a hunter nor a king worthy to mount a horse."

== Religion ==
In his piece in the General History of Africa, Volume 4, p. 133, Djibril Tamsir Niane alludes to Sundiata being a Muslim. According to Fage, there is nothing in the original epos that supports the claim. Sundiata is regarded as a great hunter and magician whose subjects predominantly adhered to traditional beliefs, as did Sundiata. However, some of Sundiata's successors were Muslim, with Mansa Musa Keita being one of the most widely known. The explorer Ibn Battuta, who visited Mali during the reign of Sundiata's great-nephew Suleyman, claimed that Mansa Musa's grandfather was named Sariq Jata and had converted to Islam. This may be a reference to Sundiata, though if so Ibn Battuta was apparently mistaken about the genealogy, as Musa's grandfather was Sundiata's brother Mande Bory. Other medieval Arabic sources claim that a ruler before Sundiata named Barmandana was the first ruler of Mali to convert to Islam.

Some Muslim griots later added to the epic of Sundiata by claiming that Sundiata has "an ancestral origin among the companions of Muhammad in Mecca" (namely, Bilal Ibn Rabah) and speaks of himself as a successor to Dhu al-Qarnayn, a conqueror and king mentioned in the Quran, commonly regarded as a reference to Alexander the Great. Claims such as these are referred to by scholars like G. Wesley Johnson as nothing more than "Islamic legitimacy" - in African countries where Islam is now the predominant religion such as Senegal, and where Muslim griots try to link historical African figures to Muhammad either through a line of descent or by claiming that the ancestor of the historical figure belonged to Muhammad's tribe or was one of his followers (an attempt to distance them from their traditional African religious past). Regardless, it is clear that the original epic of Sundiata was later affected by what Ralph Austen calls "Islamicate" culture—that is, the integration of Islamic and Arab culture.

== Imperial Mali ==
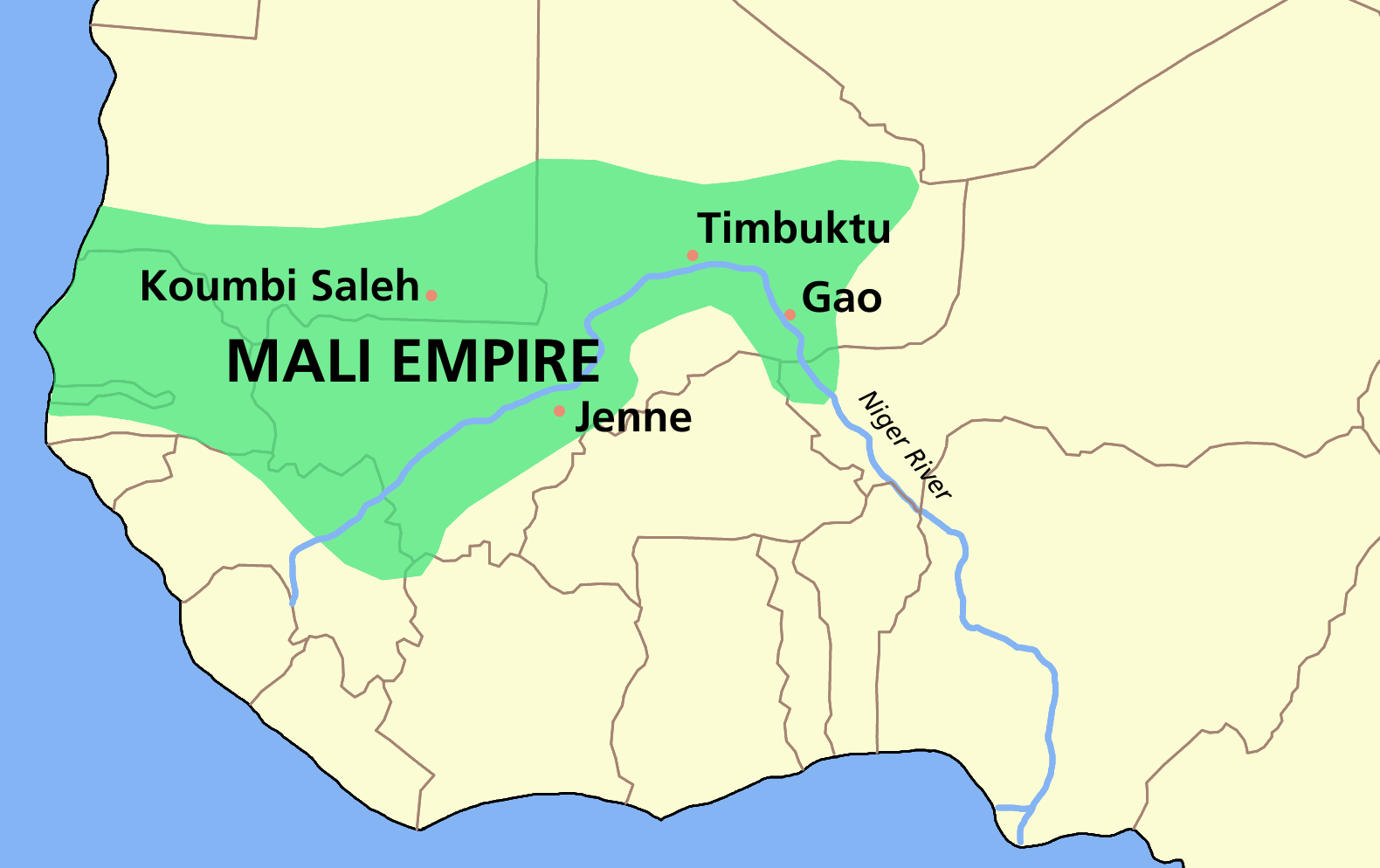
By the 14th century, the Mali Empire "extended from the Atlantic Ocean eastward along the Niger River valley to Hausaland (northern Nigeria)..."

After his victory at Kirina, Mansa Sundiata established his capital at Niani, near the present-day Malian border with Guinea. Assisted by his generals, Tiramakhan being one of the most prominent, he went on to conquer other states. The lands of the old Ghana Empire were conquered. The king of Jolof was defeated by Tiramakhan and his kingdom reduced to a vassal state. After defeating the former ally of Soumaoro, Tiramakhan ventured deep into present-day Senegal, the Gambia and Guinea Bissau and conquered them. Tiramakhan was responsible for the conquest of the Senegambia. In Kaabu (part of present-day Guinea Bissau), he defeated the last great Bainuk king (King Kikikor) and annexed his state. The great Kikikor was killed and his kingdom was renamed Kaabu. Sundiata was responsible for the conquest of Diafunu and Kita. Although the conquered states were answerable to the Mansa (king) of Mali, Sundiata was not an absolute monarch despite what the title implies. Though he probably wielded popular authority, the Mali Empire was reportedly run like a federation with each tribe having a chief representative at the court. The first tribes were Mandinka clans of Traore, Kamara, Koroma, Konde (or Conde), and of course Keita. The Great Gbara Assembly was in charge of checking the Mansa's power, enforcing his edicts among their people, and selecting the successor (usually the Mansa's son, brother or sister's son). The Empire flourished from the 13th to the late 14th century but began to decline as some vassal states threw away the yoke of Mali and regained their independence. Some of these former vassals went on to form empires of their own.

== Death ==
The generally accepted death year of Mansa Sundiata Keita is c. 1255. However, there is very little information regarding his cause of death. Not only are there different versions, mainly modern, but Mandinka tradition forbids disclosing the burial ground of their great kings. According to some, he died of drowning while trying to cross the Sankarani River, near Niani. If one is to believe Delafosse, he was "accidentally killed by an arrow during a ceremony." Others have maintained that he was assassinated at a public demonstration, also known as a Gitten. At present, the generally accepted cause of death is drowning in the Sankarani River, where a shrine that bears his name still remains today (Sundiata-dun meaning Sundiata's deep water). His three sons (Mansa Wali Keita, Mansa Ouati Keita and Mansa Khalifa Keita) went on to succeed him as Mansas of the Empire. The famous and notably ostentatious West African ruler Mansa Musa was Sundiata Keita's great-nephew.

== Legacy ==
A strong army was a major contributor to the success of Imperial Mali during the reign of Mansa Sundiata Keita. Credit to Mali's conquests cannot all be attributed to Sundiata Keita but equally shared among his generals, and in this, Tiramakhan Traore stood out as one of the elite generals and warlords of Sundiata's Imperial Mali. However, in a wider perspective of 13th century West African military history, Sundiata stood out as a great leader who was able to command the loyalties of his generals and army.

It was during his reign that Mali first began to become an economic power, a trend continued by his successors and improved on thanks to the ground work set by Sundiata, who controlled the region's trade routes and gold fields. The social and political constitution of Mali were first being codified during the reign of Mansa Sundiata Keita. Known as the Gbara and the Kouroukan Fouga, although not written and even subject to alterations in retelling and when they were first recorded in written form, they were part of the social and political norms of Mali. Many of these laws have been incorporated into the constitution of modern-day Mali.

"By unifying the military force of 12 states, Sundiata becomes an emperor known as the Lion King of Mali, who controls tribes from the Niger River west to the Atlantic Ocean. Walt Disney Studios reprised the story of Sundiata in 1994 as an animated film, The Lion King, with animals substituting for the humans of Mali legend."

— Ellen Snodgrass

Sundiata Keita was not merely a conqueror who was able to rule over a large empire with different tribes and languages, but also developed Mali's mechanisms for agriculture, and is reported to have introduced cotton and weaving in Mali. Towards the end of his reign, "absolute security" is reported to have "prevailed throughout his dominion."

From a global perspective, the Epic of Sundiata and the Mali Empire is taught in many schools, colleges and universities, not just in West Africa but in many parts of the World. Some scholars such as Mary Ellen Snodgrass and others have observed similarities with the 13th-century Epic of Sundiata to Walt Disney's 1994 animated film The Lion King. Disney has maintained that the film was inspired by William Shakespeare's Hamlet.

The 1995 Burkinabe movie Keïta! l'Héritage du griot tells the legend of Sundiata Keita.

The video game Age of Empires II HD: The African Kingdoms contains a five-chapter campaign depicting Sundjata.

The 4X video game Civilization VI includes Sundiata Keita as an alternate leader for the Malian civilization in the "Rulers of the Sahara" Pack of the New Leader Pass.

== See also ==
- Guinea Conakry
- History of Guinea-Bissau
- History of Mali
- History of Senegal
- History of the Gambia
- Sosso people

Preceded by none	Mansa of the Mali Empire; 1230–1255	Succeeded by Wali Keita
