= Mansa Muhammad =

14th-century ruler of the Mali Empire

Muhammad ibn Qu

Mansa of Mali
- Predecessor: Qu
- Successor: Musa I
- Died: c. 1312; Atlantic Ocean or the Americas (disputed)
- Dynasty: Keita
- Father: Mansa Qu

Muhammad ibn Qu (Arabic: محمد بن قو, romanized: Muḥammad ibn Qū; fl. 14th century) was the eighth mansa of the Mali Empire. He succeeded his father, Mansa Qu, and was the predecessor of Mali's most famous ruler, Mansa Musa.

Musa said Mansa Muhammad disappeared leading an expedition into the Atlantic Ocean.

== Reign ==
The exact dates of Muhammad ibn Qu's reign are not known with certainty, though his reign was certainly brief. His father's predecessor, Sakura, was killed at some point between 1298 and 1308 and his own successor Musa took the throne in 1307 or 1312.

== Atlantic voyage ==
In 1324, while staying in Cairo during his hajj, Mansa Musa, the ruler of the Mali Empire, told an Egyptian official whom he had befriended that he had come to rule when his predecessor led a large fleet in an attempt to cross the Atlantic Ocean and never returned. This account, recorded by the Arab historian al-Umari, has attracted considerable interest and speculation as a possible instance of pre-Columbian trans-oceanic contact. The voyage is popularly attributed to a Mansa Abu Bakr II, (Note: Variously spelled as Abu Bakr II or Abubakari II) but no such mansa ever reigned, and it was Mansa Muhammad who disappeared at sea.

=== Musa’s tale ===
Mansa Musa stayed in Cairo for three months in 1324 while en route to Mecca for the hajj. While there, he befriended an emir named Abu al-Hasan Ali ibn Amir Hajib, who was the governor of the district of Cairo Musa was staying in. Ibn Amir Hajib later relayed to the scholar al-Umari what he had learned of Mali from his conversations with Musa. In one such conversation, Ibn Amir Hajib had asked Musa how he had become king, and Musa responded:

We belong to a house which hands on the kingship by inheritance. The king who was my predecessor did not believe that it was impossible to discover the furthest limit of the Atlantic Ocean and wished vehemently to do so. So he equipped 200 ships filled with men and the same number equipped with gold, water, and provisions enough to last them for years, and said to the man deputed to lead them: "Do not return until you reach the end of it or your provisions and water give out." They departed and a long time passed before anyone came back. Then one ship returned and we asked the captain what news they brought. He said: "Yes, O Sultan, we traveled for a long time until there appeared in the open sea [as it were] a river with a powerful current. Mine was the last of those ships. The [other] ships went on ahead but when they reached that place they did not return and no more was seen of them and we do not know what became of them. As for me, I went about at once and did not enter that river." But the sultan disbelieved him. Then that sultan got ready 2,000 ships, 1,000 for himself and the men whom he took with him and 1,000 for water and provisions. He left me to deputize for him and embarked on the Atlantic Ocean with his men. That was the last we saw of him and all those who were with him, and so I became king in my own right.

Al-Umari’s record of this conversation is the only known account of this voyage, as it is not mentioned by other medieval Arab historians or West African oral tradition. Nonetheless, the possibility of such a voyage has been taken seriously by several historians.

== Family tree ==
Maghan Kon Fatta
**1. Mari Jata**; Sunjata	Abu Bakr (Note: In 1959, D. T. Niane regarded Sunjata's brother Abu Bakr/Mande Bori as having reigned between Khalifa and Sakura. However, Ibn Khaldun said that the Abu Bakr who reigned between Khalifa and Sakura was the grandson of Sunjata through his daughter, not the brother of Sunjata, and only mentions Sunjata's brother Abu Bakr as being the ancestor of Musa. Niane later accepted Levtzion's interpretation that Abu Bakr/Mande Bori and the Abu Bakr who reigned between Khalifa and Sakura were different figures.); Mande Bori
**2. Uli**; Yerelinkon	**3. Wati**	**4. Khalifa**	daughter	Faga Leye (Note: The literal translation of Ibn Khaldun is that Musa is the son of Abu Bakr, but the line can also be read as more generally indicating Abu Bakr as an ancestor of Musa. Oral tradition names Musa's father as Faga Leye. Regarding Musa as Abu Bakr's grandson is more chronologically plausible.)
**7. Qu**; Ko or Ko Mamadi	**5. Abu Bakr** (Note: In 1959, D. T. Niane, following De Slane's mistaken interpretation that there were two mansas named Abu Bakr, identified the Abu Bakr I (who reigned between Khalifa and Sakura) with Mande Bori, Sunjata's brother, and Abu Bakr II (who De Slane regarded as reigning between Muhammad and Musa) with Bata Mande Bori, a figure who is said to be a son of Sunjata by the jeliw of Dioma. The word "Bata" indicates that Bata Mande Bori was not the biological son of Sunjata, but related to him through the female line. De Slane's translation called Abu Bakr II a son of Sunjata's sister, and Niane accepted this interpretation of Abu Bakr/Bata Mande Bori's relationship. However, with Levtzion's 1963 discovery that De Slane had mistranslated Ibn Khaldun, only one Abu Bakr was recognized as having reigned, placed between Khalifa and Sakura. This Abu Bakr is said to be the son of Sunjata's daughter by Ibn Khaldun, and is interpreted as corresponding to the Bata Mande Bori of oral tradition, with Mande Bori never having reigned. Niane later agreed with this identification.); Bata Mande Bori	**9. Musa**; Kanku Musa
**8. Muhammad**; Ko Mamadi or Niani Mamadu

Genealogy of the mansas of the Mali Empire up to Musa, following Levtzion's interpretation of Ibn Khaldun.Bolded individuals reigned as mansa of the Mali Empire, with numbers indicating the order in which they ruled. The sixth mansa, Sakura, is not included as he was not related to the others. The upper, non-italicized name is the name given by Ibn Khaldun, the lower name is the name given in oral tradition.

Since Al-Umari’s record of Musa's account does not mention the mansa's name, the only indication of his identity is that he was Musa's predecessor. The identity of the mansa responsible for the voyage has been subject to some confusion. According to the Arab historian Ibn Khaldun, writing several decades later, Musa's predecessor as mansa was Muhammad ibn Qu (Mansa Muhammad). As such, several historians have attributed the voyage to Mansa Muhammad.

Many sources call the mansa in question Abu Bakr II. However, the inclusion of a Mansa Abu Bakr II in the list of Malian rulers is an error that originated in a mistranslation of Ibn Khaldun’s text by the 19th-century European historian Baron de Slane. De Slane translated Ibn Khaldun as saying that the kingship passed from Muhammad to Abu Bakr, then to Musa. However, in the original Arabic text, Abu Bakr is only mentioned in his role as the progenitor of Musa's lineage, not as a ruler. The Abu Bakr in question was a brother of Sunjata, the founder of the Mali Empire, and apparently never himself ruled. Another figure named Abu Bakr did rule as mansa, but he was the predecessor of Sakura, not Musa.

== Legacy ==
Mansa Musa himself appears to have considered his predecessor's plan to be impractical. The main point he appears to have been trying to make to Ibn Amir Hajib is that his predecessor's failed voyage paved the way to his becoming king. Likewise, it has been speculated that the lack of information in oral tradition about the voyage reflects a view that the mansa's voyage was a shameful abdication of duty.

In modern times, the voyage has become more celebrated. The Malian historian Gaoussou Diawara has remarked that the mansa should be looked up to by modern politicians as an example of a ruler who valued science and discovery over holding onto power.

== See also ==
- Zheng He (admiral of the 14th-century Chinese long-distance fleet)
- Pre-Columbian transoceanic contact theories
- List of people who disappeared mysteriously at sea
- Keita Dynasty

== Bibliography ==
- Austen, Ralph A.; Jan A. M. M. Jansen (1996). "History, Oral Transmission and Structure in Ibn Khaldun's Chronology of Mali Rulers". History in Africa. 23 (1). Waltham, MA: African Studies Association: 17–28. doi:10.2307/3171932. hdl:1887/2778. ISSN 0361-5413. JSTOR 3171932. OCLC 2246846. S2CID 53136557.
- Baxter, Joan (2000-12-13). "Africa's 'greatest explorer'". BBC News.
- Bell, Nawal Morcos (1972). "The Age of Mansa Musa of Mali: Problems in Succession and Chronology". International Journal of African Historical Studies. 5 (2). New York: Africana Publishing, for the Boston University African Studies Center: 221–234. doi:10.2307/217515. ISSN 0361-7882. JSTOR 217515. OCLC 48537235.
- Canós-Donnay, Sirio (2019-02-25). "The Empire of Mali". Oxford Research Encyclopedia of African History. Oxford University Press. doi:10.1093/acrefore/9780190277734.013.266. ISBN 978-0-19-027773-4.
- Cooley, William Desborough (1841). The Negroland of the Arabs Examined and Explained; or, An Inquiry into the Early History and Geography of Central Africa. London: J. Arrowsmith. OCLC 4760870.
- Devisse, J.; Labib, S. (1984). "Africa in inter-continental relations". In Niane, D. T. (ed.). General History of Africa IV: Africa from the Twelfth to the Sixteenth Century.
- Fauvelle, François-Xavier (2018) [2013]. "The Sultan and the Sea". The Golden Rhinoceros: Histories of the African Middle Ages. Troy Tice (trans.). Princeton University Press. ISBN 978-0-691-18126-4.
- Gomez, Michael A. (2018). African Dominion: A New History of Empire in Early and Medieval West Africa. Princeton University Press. ISBN 9780691196824.
- Haslip-Viera, Gabriel; Bernard Ortiz de Montellano; Warren Barbour (June 1997). "Robbing Native American Cultures: Van Sertima's Afrocentricity and the Olmecs". Current Anthropology. 38 (3). Chicago, IL: University of Chicago Press, sponsored by Wenner-Gren Foundation for Anthropological Research: 419–441. doi:10.1086/204626. ISSN 0011-3204. OCLC 62217742. S2CID 162054657. Archived from the original (Reproduced online) on 2011-04-15.
- Haslip-Viera, Gabriel; Ortiz de Montellano, Bernard; Barbour, Warren (1997). "Robbing Native American Cultures: Van Sertima's Afrocentricity and the Olmecs". Current Anthropology. 38 (3): 419–441. doi:10.1086/204626. S2CID 162054657.
- Morison, Samuel Eliot (1963). Journals and Other Documents on the Life and Voyages of Christopher Columbus. New York: The Heritage Press.
- Levtzion, Nehemia (1963). "The Thirteenth- and Fourteenth-Century Kings of Mali". Journal of African History. 4 (3). Cambridge: Cambridge University Press: 341–353. doi:10.1017/S002185370000428X. ISSN 0021-8537. JSTOR 180027. OCLC 1783006. S2CID 162413528.
- Levtzion, Nehemia (1977). "The western Mahgrib and Sudan". In Roland Anthony Oliver (volume ed.) (ed.). The Cambridge History of Africa: Vol. 3, From c. 1050 to c. 1600. John Donnelly Fage and Roland Oliver (series general eds.) (reprinted 2001 ed.). Cambridge: Cambridge University Press. pp. 331–462. ISBN 0-521-20981-1. OCLC 185545332.
- Levtzion, Nehemia; Hopkins, J. F. P., eds. (2000). Corpus of Early Arabic Sources for West African History. Markus Wiener Publishers. ISBN 978-1-55876-241-1.
- Masonen, Pekka (2000). The Negroland Revisited: Discovery and Invention of the Sudanese Middle Ages. Annales Academiae Scientiarum Fennicae, Ser. Humaniora, no. 309. Helsinki: Finnish Academy of Science and Letters. ISBN 951-41-0886-8. OCLC 45681680.
- Ortiz de Montellano, Bernard; Gabriel Haslip-Viera; Warren Barbour (Spring 1997). "They Were NOT Here before Columbus: Afrocentric Hyperdiffusionism in the 1990s". Ethnohistory. 44 (2). Durham, NC: Duke University Press, issued by the American Society for Ethnohistory: 199–234. doi:10.2307/483368. ISSN 0014-1801. JSTOR 483368. OCLC 42388116.
- Niane, Djibril Tamsir (1959). "Recherches sur l'Empire du Mali au Moyen Age". Recherches Africaines (in French). Archived from the original on 2007-05-19.
- Niane, D. T. (1984). "Mali and the second Mandingo expansion". In Niane, D. T. (ed.). General History of Africa IV: Africa from the Twelfth to the Sixteenth Century.
- Rucker, Walter C. (2018). "The Black Atlantic and the African Diaspora". Oxford Research Encyclopedia of Religion. Oxford University Press. ISBN 978-0-19-934037-8.
- Taube, Karl (2004). Olmec Art at Dumbarton Oaks (PDF). Pre-Columbian Art at Dumbarton Oaks, no. 2. Washington, D.C.: Dumbarton Oaks Research Library and Collection; Trustees of Harvard University. ISBN 0-88402-275-7. OCLC 56096117. Archived from the original (PDF online reproduction) on 2008-02-27.
- Thacher, John Boyd (1903). Christopher Columbus: his life, his work, his remains, as revealed by original printed and manuscript records, together with an essay on Peter Martyr of Anghera and Bartolomé De Las Casas, the first Historians of America. New York: G. P. Putnam's Sons.
- Thornton, John K. (2012-09-10). A Cultural History of the Atlantic World, 1250-1820. Cambridge University Press. ISBN 978-0521727341.
- Van Sertima, Ivan (1976). They Came Before Columbus. New York: Random House. ISBN 0-8129-6817-4.

Preceded by Mansa Qu	Mansa of the Mali Empire	Succeeded by Musa I
