= Abu Bakr (mansa) =

Mansa of Mali
- Predecessor: Khalifa
- Successor: Sakura
- Dynasty: Keita

Abu Bakr, (Note: Also spelled Abubakari) known as Bata Mande Bori (Note: Spelled variously: Manding/Mande/Manden, Bory/Bori) in oral tradition, was the fifth mansa of the Mali Empire, reigning during the late 13th century. (Note: There are few precise dates for the history of the Mali Empire. An earlier mansa, Wali, performed the hajj during the reign of Baibars (1260–1277) and Abu Bakr's successor Sakura performed the hajj during the reign of An-Nasir Muhammad (probably 1298–1308). Abu Bakr's reign has been dated to 1275–1285, but this is speculative.) He was a son of a daughter of Sunjata, the founder of the Mali Empire, and may have been adopted by Sunjata as a son. Abu Bakr succeeded Khalifa, a tyrant who was deposed after a brief reign. Abu Bakr was the first mansa of the Mali Empire to succeed through the female line. It remains debated whether Abu Bakr's succession marked a return to a traditional pattern of succession that had been ignored by his predecessors or if it was a break from traditional succession caused by political instability. After an unremarkable reign, Abu Bakr was succeeded by Sakura, an enslaved court official who seized power in a coup.

== Identity ==
The identities of the two figures named Abu Bakr mentioned in Ibn Khaldun's history of the Mali Empire and the figures in oral tradition named Mande Bori and Bata Mande Bori have been subject to some confusion. According to oral tradition, Sunjata had a brother named Mande Bori. Some traditions also claim he had a son named Bata Mande Bori, though this son is not mentioned in all traditions. The word "Bata" suggests that Bata Mande Bori was not a biological son of Sunjata and was rather related to him through the female line, though he may have been adopted by Sunjata. Ibn Khaldun mentions two figures named Abu Bakr: the first is a son of Sunjata's daughter who reigned as mansa between Khalifa and Sakura and the second is a brother of Sunjata who was the ancestor of Mansa Musa.

The confusion arose from a mistranslation by the 19th-century historian Baron de Slane. De Slane interpreted the second Abu Bakr as being a son of Sunjata's sister and believed he reigned as mansa between Muhammad and Musa. In 1959, Djibril Tamsir Niane identified Mande Bori with the first Abu Bakr and Bata Mande Bori with the second Abu Bakr. The confusion was resolved in 1963 by Nehemia Levtzion, who studied the original manuscripts and realized a mistranslation had been made. The first Abu Bakr, who reigned between Khalifa and Sakura, was a son of Sunjata's daughter and can be identified with Bata Mande Bori. The second Abu Bakr, who did not reign as mansa and is only mentioned by Ibn Khaldun as the progenitor of Musa's lineage, was Sunjata's brother and should be identified with Mande Bori.

As De Slane's misinterpretation led to the belief that a figure named Abu Bakr was Musa's immediate predecessor, the name Abu Bakr II became associated with Musa's statement that his predecessor launched two expeditions to explore the Atlantic Ocean. Musa's predecessor, and thus the likely subject of the anecdote, was actually Muhammad ibn Qu.

Historian Francois-Xavier Fauvelle has proposed that Abu Bakr I was in fact the father or grandfather of Mansa Musa, and that his reign created a dynastic split, with Musa's successors eventually claiming that their ancestor Abu Bakr (Mande Bori) was the brother of Sundiata rather than a grandson by the female line.

== See also ==
- Mande Bori
- Mali Empire
- Keita dynasty

== Footnotes ==
Preceded by Khalifa Keita	Mansa of the Mali Empire	Succeeded by Sakura
