= Keita dynasty =

11th–17th century dynasty in northwestern Africa

The Keita dynasty ruled pre-imperial and imperial Mali from the 11th century into the early 17th century. It was a Muslim dynasty, and its rulers claimed descent from Bilal ibn Rabah. The early history is entirely unknown, outside of legends and myths. The first Keita mansa was Sundiata Keita. This is when Mari Jata is crowned and Keita becomes a clan name. A couple of generations after him, his great-nephew, Mansa Musa Keita I of Mali, made a celebrated pilgrimage to Mecca.

The dynasty remained a major power in West Africa from the early 13th century until the breakup of the Mali Empire around 1610. Rivals from within the clan founded smaller kingdoms within contemporary Mali and Guinea. Of the members of these modern "daughter dynasties", the late politician Modibo Keita and the musician Salif Keita are arguably the most famous.

== Legendary Ancestors ==
According to Muslim tradition, Bilal ibn Rabah was a freed slave, possibly of Abyssinian descent, who accepted Islam and became one of the Sahabahs of Muhammad. Bilal ibn Rabah bears the distinction of being the first muezzin in Islam. According to Mandinka/Bambara legends dating to the period after the conversion to Islam and passed down by djelis, Bilal had seven sons, one of whom settled in the Manding region. This son, Lawalo Keita, had a son named Latal Kalabi Keita, who later sired Damul Kalabi Keita. Damul Kalabi Keita's son was Lahilatoul Keita and the first faama of the city of Niani. It is through Lahilatoul that the Keita clan becomes a ruling dynasty, though only over the small area around Niani.

It was common practice for griots in West Africa to invent Islamic ancestors for their royal clients, to enhance their prestige and legitimacy, and this is certainly the case for the Keita. The earliest ancestors have Islamic names, while later ones have clearly non-Islamic names, but it's impossible now to determine which of these are inventions and which may have a basis in historical reality.

Time period	Person	Notes
b. 580—d. 640	Bilal ibn Rabah	Ancestor of the Keitas, сompanion (sahabah) of Muhammad
	Lawalo Keita	Son of Bilali Bounama and Hala Bint Awf (sister of Abd al-Rahman ibn Awf richest man in Mecca). Left Mecca and emigrated to Manden (Mali).
	Latal Kalabi	Son of Lawalo Keita
	Damul Kalabi	Son of Latal Kalabi
	Lahilatoul Kalabi	Son of Damul Kalabi. First sub-Saharan African prince to perform a hajj; robbed in the desert, returned after 7 years.
	Kalabi Bomba	Son of Lahilatoul Kalabi
	Kalabi Dauman	Younger son of Lahilatoul Kalabi. Preferred fortune, ancestor of traders.
c. 1050	Mamadi Kani	Son of Kalabi Bomba. Hunter king, inventor of the hunter's whistle, communicated with the jinn of the bush, loved by Kondolon Ni Sané.
	Sané Kani Simbon, Kamignogo Simbon, Kabala Simbon and Bamari Tagnogokelin Simbon together	The four sons of Mamadi Kani.
	Bamari Tagnogokelin	
1175—?	M'Bali Nene	Son of Bamari Tagnogokelin
	Bello	Son of Bamari Tagnogokelin
?—1200s	Bello Bakon	Son of Bello
1200s—1218	Maghan Kon Fatta	Son of Bello Bakon
1218—c.1230	Dankaran Touman	Son of Maghan Kon Fatta. Niani conquered by the Sosso Empire under king Soumaoro Kanté.

== List of imperial mansas of Mali ==
The name 'Keita', meaning 'heritage taker', post-dates the rise of the empire. Sundiata was likely a Konate, and is praised as such in oral histories. It is unclear when the name shifted.

Most of the names of the imperial mansas of Mali are known through the works of Ibn Khaldun. Historian Francois-Xavier Fauvelle has postulated a long-running dynastic competition between two branches of the dynasty, which he terms the Maridjatids and the Abubakrids after their founders. The Maridjatids (descendants of Sundiata by the male line) are best remembered in oral tradition, while written accounts by Arab sources focus on the Abubakrids.

Reign	Incumbent	Notes	Branch
c. 1235–1255	Mari Djata I (Sundiata)	Son of Manghan Kon Fatta	Maridjatids (founder)
c. 1255–1270	Uli Keita	Son of Mari Djata I	Maridjatids
c. 1270–1274	Wati Keita	Son of Mari Djata I	Maridjatids
c. 1274–1275	Khalifa Keita	Son of Mari Djata I	Maridjatids
c. 1275–1285	Abubakari Keita I	Son of Mari Djata's daughter	Abubakrids (founder)
c. 1285–1300	Sakura		Usurper
c. 1300–1305	Gao Keita		Maridjatids
c. 1305–1312	Mohammed ibn Gao Keita		Maridjatids
1312–1337	Mansa Musa Keita I		Abubakrids
1337–1341	Maghan Keita I		Abubakrids
1341–1360	Souleyman Keita	Co-ruler: Kassi	Abubakrids
1360	Camba Keita		Abubakrids
1360–1374	Mari Djata Keita II		Abubakrids
1374—1387	Musa Keita II		Abubakrids
1387—1389	Maghan Keita II		Abubakrids
1389—1390	Sandaki		Usurper
1390—1404	Maghan Keita III (also known as Mahmud Keita I)		Maridjatids
1404—c. 1440	Musa Keita III		
c.1460—1480/1481	Uli Keita II		
1480/1481—1496	Mahmud Keita II (also known as Mamadou Keita)		
1496—1559	Mahmud Keita III		
1559—c.1590	Unknown mansa or vacancy		
c.1590—c.1610	Mahmud Keita IV	Empire collapses after death of Mahmud Keita IV.	

== List of post-imperial mansas of Mali ==
Reign	Incumbent	Notes
c.1610—c.1660	Unknown number of mansas	
c.1660—c.1670	Mama Maghan	Capital moved from Niani to Kangaba after botched attack on Segou.

== See also ==
- Mali Empire
- Faama
- Mansa
- Modibo Keita
- Salif Keita
- List of Sunni Muslim dynasties

== Sources ==
- Cooley, William Desborough (1966). The Negroland of the Arabs Examined and Explained. London: Routledge. p. 143 Pages. ISBN 0-7146-1799-7.
- Stewart, John (1989). African States and Rulers: An Encyclopedia of Native, Colonial, and Independent States and Rulers Past and Present. Jefferson: McFarland & Company. p. 395 Pages. ISBN 0-89950-390-X.
