= Takedda =

Azelik
- Location within Niger
- Coordinates: 17°31′6″N 6°46′59″E
- Country: Niger
- Region: Agadez
- Department: Tchirozérine

Takedda was a town and former kingdom located in present-day Niger. The archaeological site at Azelik wan Birni is believed to be the ruins of ancient Takedda.

== History ==
Trade routes of the Western Sahara Desert c. 1000–1500. Goldfields are indicated by light brown shading: Bambuk, Bure, Lobi, and Akan.

Takedda was founded by the Sanhaja, a Berber tribal confederation inhabiting the Maghreb. In the 14th century (possibly also earlier and later) the Tuareg-controlled kingdom of Takedda, west of the Aïr Massif, played a prominent role in long-distance trade, notably owing to the importance of its copper mines. Takedda was visited by Ibn Battuta on his return trip from the Mali Empire in 1353.

Evidence of copperworking have been found at the site dating to the first millennium BC. The French archeologist, Danilo Grébénart, has excavated the site and has studied the significance of this prehistoric non-ferrous metal industry.

The reign of Mansa Sakoura (also spelt Sakura) appears to have been beneficial despite the political shake-up. He added the first conquests to Mali since the reign of Ouali including the former Wagadou provinces of Tekrour and Diara. His conquests did not stop at the boundaries of Wagadou however. He campaigned into Senegal and conquered the Wolof province of Dyolof then took the army east to subjugate the copper producing area of Takedda.

== Sources ==
- Dunn, Ross E. (2005), The Adventures of Ibn Battuta, University of California Press, ISBN 0-520-24385-4. First published in 1986, ISBN 0-520-05771-6.
- Grébénart, Danilo (1993), "Azelik Takedda et le cuivre médiéval dans la région d'Agadez", Le Saharien (Paris), 125 (2): 28–33.
- Levtzion, Nehemia; Hopkins, John F.P., eds. (2000) [First published 1981], Corpus of Early Arabic Sources for West Africa, New York: Marcus Weiner Press, ISBN 1-55876-241-8. Pages 279-304 contain Ibn Battuta's account of his visit to West Africa.
