= Fakoli =

13th-century general in the Mali Empire

Fakoli Kamara or Koroma was a semi-legendary 13th century chieftain and general in the army of Sundiata Keita, founder of the Mali Empire. He is one of the most important heroes in the Epic of Sundiata and Mande oral literature in general.

== Biography ==
According to oral tradition, Fakoli was the son of Kangouba Kante and a djinn. He ruled over Doundougou, a region northwest of Ouelessebougou. He was famously short. He joined the army of his uncle Soumaoro Kanté, and stole critical blacksmithing secrets from Mansa Kara Kamara of Niani, leading to the latter's defeat. He eventually abandoned his uncle and joined his rival Sundiata when Soumaoro tried to take Fakoli's wife for himself.

After the foundation of the empire Fakoli and Tiramakhan Traore played a critical role in subduing recalcitrant petty kings of the Manding region. He assassinated the rebellious Mansa Kara Kamara and took Bambouk, an important gold mining region.
