= Mansa Sakura =

Mansa of Mali
- Predecessor: Abu Bakr
- Successor: Qu
- Died: c. 1300; Tajura, Ifriqiya
- Issue: Sogolon Nyuman
- Religion: Islam

Sakura (Arabic: ساكورة, romanized: Sākūra; (Note: Ibn Khaldun spells Sakura three different ways: صاكوره Ṣākūrah, ساكورة Sākūra, and سبكرة Sabkara. The last of these he says is the pronunciation used by the people of Ghana. Recorded oral traditions spell his name Sekura or Sekure.) French: Sakoura; fl. 13th–14th century) was a mansa of the Mali Empire who reigned during the late 13th century, known primarily from an account given by Ibn Khaldun in his Kitāb al-ʻIbar. Sakura was not a member of the ruling Keita dynasty, and may have been formerly enslaved. He usurped the throne following a period of political instability and led Mali to considerable territorial expansion. During his reign, trade between the Mali Empire and the rest of the Muslim world increased. He was killed in the early 1300s while returning from the hajj and the Keita dynasty was restored to power.

== Biography ==
Sakura is commonly stated to have been a former slave of the royal court, but it is not clear if he was literally enslaved. Ibn Khaldun refers to him by the term mawlā (Arabic: مولى), which can be translated as "client", and may imply that he was formerly enslaved but was freed by the Keitas. In oral tradition, he is called jonni, meaning "little slave". It is possible that Sakura was a member of the tontajon taniworo, the sixteen clans of freemen who had the right to bear a quiver. Despite being freemen, the tontajon taniworo are metaphorically referred to as slaves.

According to oral tradition, Sakura had a daughter, Sogolon Nyuman.

=== Reign ===
During the late 13th century, the leadership of the Mali Empire involved ongoing palace intrigues, with a power struggle between the gbara or Grand Council and the donson ton or hunter guilds. The historian Nehemia Levtzion speculated that Sakura may have been involved in a previous coup, in which Mansa Khalifa had been overthrown and replaced by Sunjata's grandson or nephew Abu Bakr. Eventually, Sakura seized the throne himself. The French colonial administrator and ethnographer Maurice Delafosse estimated his accession to have occurred in 1285.

Sakura was evidently able to stabilize his control of the Mali Empire, as he proceeded to launch a series of military campaigns which expanded the borders of the Mali Empire considerably. According to Ibn Khaldun, in his reign Malian rule extended west to the ocean and east to Takrur, by which Ibn Khaldun meant a land east of Gao and west of Kanem, not Takrur along the Senegal River. Trade between the Mali Empire and the rest of the Muslim world also began to flourish.

Ibn Khaldun credits Sakura with the conquest of Gao, but subsequently gives a conflicting account that Gao was conquered during the reign of Mansa Musa. The Tarikh al-Sudan agrees with the second account in crediting the conquest of Gao to Musa. It is possible that Sakura had indeed conquered Gao, but that ʿAlī Kulun, founder of the Sunni dynasty, liberated it only for Musa to reassert control over Gao decades later. It is also possible that Mali's control of Gao varied over time, with Mansa Uli, Sakura, and Musa able to secure control of it but control lapsing under less-powerful rulers.

According to Ibn Khaldun, Sakura performed the hajj. He was the first mansa to do so since Uli. Sakura may have sought to strengthen ties with the rest of the Muslim world and display Mali's power during his hajj. Oral tradition does not record Sakura as having performed the hajj.

Sakura's death most likely occurred in the early 1300s. (Note: The date of Sakura's hajj and subsequent death can be estimated by Ibn Khaldun's statement that he performed the hajj during the reign of al-Nasir Muhammad. Al-Nasir Muhammad reigned on three occasions; his first reign was brief and his third reign largely corresponded to the reign of Mansa Musa, so Sakura's hajj most likely took place during his second reign (1299–1309). Delafosse estimated his death to have occurred in 1300.) In Ibn Khaldun's account, Sakura was killed while returning from the hajj in the town of Tajura, 12 miles east of Tripoli, (Note: Delafosse believed that Sakura's assassination took place in Tadjoura, modern Djibouti, but Tadjoura is far from any likely route between Mali and Mecca, so Tajura is more likely. Delafosse also provided a detailed account that specified that Sakura was killed by Danakil robbers, and that his body was brought to Bornu, whose ruler ensured the body was returned to Mali for a royal burial, but he provided no sources for any of those claims, all of which seem to have been speculation on his part.) whereas oral tradition says that Kon Mamadi (Qu), a grandson of Sunjata, killed him himself with the help of Sakura's daughter. After Sakura's death, Qu succeeded him as mansa.

== Legacy ==
Ibn Khaldun regarded Sakura as a mighty ruler and describes his reign in greater detail than his predecessors. The 20th-century historian Djibril Tamsir Niane regarded Sakura as having saved the Mali Empire from political crisis. By contrast, there are few recorded oral histories that mention him, and what little mention he receives in them focuses on his status as an usurper. Niane suggested that this may be a deliberate exclusion on the part of oral historians, and it is possible that the few accounts of Sakura recorded in oral tradition are later additions based on the account given by Ibn Khaldun. The memory of Sakura may have been partially incorporated into the hero Fakoli of oral tradition, a great general who supported Sunjata.

The 21st-century historian Michael A. Gomez has expressed skepticism of Sakura's reign, suggesting that aspects of Musa's reign were attributed to Sakura to allow for indirect criticism of Musa.

== Footnotes ==
Preceded by Abu Bakr	Mansa of the Mali Empire; 1285–1300	Succeeded by Gao
