= Khalifa of Mali =

Mansa of the Mali Empire

Khalifa

Mansa of Mali
- Predecessor: Wati
- Successor: Abu Bakr
- Dynasty: Keita
- Father: Mari Jata?
- Religion: Islam

Khalifa was a 13th-century Mansa of the Mali Empire mentioned by the medieval Arab scholar Ibn Khaldun. All that is known of Khalifa's life comes from a brief mention in Ibn Khaldun's Kitāb al-ʻIbar:

[Mārī Jāṭa] ruled for 25 years, according to what they relate, and when he died his son Mansā Walī ruled after him...His brother Wātī ruled after him and then a third brother, Khalīfa. Khalīfa was insane and devoted to archery and used to shoot arrows at his people and kill them wantonly so they rose against him and killed him. He was succeeded by a sibṭ [son of a daughter] of Mārī Jāṭa, called Abū Bakr, who was the son of his daughter.

Oral tradition does not mention Khalifa, which the historian Djibril Tamsir Niane attributed to oral historians often only remembering rulers who left descendants. While Ibn Khaldun's genealogy implies Sunjata had at least three sons, oral tradition varies on the number of sons Sunjata had, but many traditions claim he had only one, Yerelinkon, who corresponds to the Mansa Wali mentioned by Ibn Khaldun. However, some traditions claim that in addition to his biological son(s), Sunjata adopted the sons of his generals, though it is not specified who these adopted sons were. In any case, it is unclear whether Khalifa was actually a son of Sunjata. The historians Ralph Austen and Jan Jansen argued that Ibn Khaldun's account of Mali's history should not be taken entirely literally, as it reflects Ibn Khaldun's worldview that dynasties typically followed a four-generation cycle of decline. Khalifa, as the fourth ruler of Mali, corresponds to the fourth generation in Ibn Khaldun's theory, where the dynasty descends into tyranny and is overthrown, beginning the cycle anew. The historian Michael Gomez has observed that khalīfa translates as "successor", and as such proposed it was not his actual name. Gomez argued that the brief reign of Khalifa was part of an ongoing power struggle between the great council and the hunter guilds. In this interpretation, Khalifa's fondness for archery would refer to his ties to the hunter guilds, and his overthrow indicates that the great council was able to take back power and put their preferred candidate on the throne, Sunjata's grandson Abu Bakr. The dates of Khalifa's reign are unknown. Maurice Delafosse placed his reign between 1273 and 1275, but many of the dates reported by Delafosse lack supporting evidence. The earlier mansa Wali went on the hajj at some point between 1260 and 1277, and the later mansa Sakura died while traveling back to Mali after going on the hajj at some point between 1298 and 1312, placing Khalifa's reign at some point in the late 13th century.

Preceded by Ouati Keita	Mansa of the Mali Empire; 1274–1275	Succeeded by Abu Bakr
