= Wati (mansa) =

Third mansa of Mali

Mansa Wati (French: "Ouati") was the third mansa of the Mali Empire, reigning sometime in the latter decades of the 13th century. Wati was the son, perhaps adoptive, of Sundiata Keita, and succeeded his brother Uli I as Mansa. He was succeeded by Khalifa. Nothing is known of his reign.

== See also ==
- Mali Empire
- Keita Dynasty

Preceded by Wali Keita	Mansa of the Mali Empire; 1270–1274	Succeeded by Khalifa Keita
