= Mande Bori =

Brother of Sunjata, grandfather of Mansa Musa, and key figure in Mali Empire's founding

Mande Bori, also known as Mande Bakari (Note: Variously spelled: Manding/Manden/Mande, Bory/Bori, Bakari/Bakary/Boukary/Bugari/Bakari.) and known in Arabic as Abu Bakr, is a heroic figure in Mande oral tradition who was involved in the founding of the Mali Empire. He was the brother and right-hand man of Sunjata, the founder of the empire, and served as the empire's kankoro-sigui, an office that has been translated as "viceroy" or "lieutenant-general". Though Mande Bori never himself reigned as mansa, his grandsons Musa and Suleyman ruled the Mali Empire at the apex of its power and prestige, and he is often erroneously cited as Mansa Abu Bakr II.

Mande Bori Keita (Manden Mori) was the only son of Narenmaghann's third wife (Maninba Camara). After his mother died when he was a child, he was cared for by Sogolon and which made many historians believe that he was one of her characters. He accompanied Sogolon and children to the political exiles and took part in every war that's given Mande's independence from Soso empire. Manden Mori was one of the people who organized Mande's hunting (Donso or Donzo) as well as its actual form.

== Name ==
He was named "Bori" or Mori, because his mother was named Manimba, people called him Manimba-bori or Mori. Therefore, during times, this started to deformed Manin Mori and during history this changed to Mande-Bori as the history told us.

== Childhood ==
His mother died too soon, and he never even got the poster. Because of Sasuma Brette’s excessive and strict nature, he was raised by Sogolon, and many believe he is her own child. When Sounjata started walking, he became a member of his company, with whom he hunted.

He suffered the same harm that Dankaran Touma and his mother inflicted on Sogolon and her children, which forced her to migrate with them to "Jadeba", "Tabon", "Kumbi", and "Mema". By the time they returned, they were already seniors.

== Pre-Kirina's wars ==
When the Mandeng sent an expedition to find Sounjata along the Niger River, they returned on the Desert way to Kunbi, and whatever battle took place along that road and settled in the Battle of Kirina, Mande Bori was always among them.

They stayed near Tabon, they encountered a troop directed by Bala (the well known Sumangourou's son), attacking against them, they defeated and drove them out, and took many of them captive (Battle of Tabon). They also encountered Soumaoro himself with a large troop near a village named as "Naiboria" (Battle of Naiboria), a class took place, and the winner was Manden Mori and his brothers till they fled back.

They encountered Nunkaiba Kanté (Soumaoro's brother) with a large troop near a village named "Kankinie" as they were stationed there. Night and darkness, Nunkeba give order to attack them, and a worst war started and it was the extra difficult war ever, that Sundiata participate: without the troop of Mema in this surprise war and the troop of Kumbi wasn't part of this night, it was impossible to win this night. They used the arrow with a chandelier to attack them, they confused and attacked each other, and ran. This war destroyed and killed part of Nounkaiba's troop, in the same way as them, and showed Soumaoro that the war would be more difficult than he thought.

After Sosso's defeat in the battle of Kankinie, Soumaoro was afraid and took the decision to prepare the general mobilization to defeat and arrest Sodiata before he became more powerful. The first recreated troops were brought and stationed to the boundary city of "Bantan", and it was celebrated by Soumaoro during the night.

After the battle of Kankinie, Soundiata and his friends, Tabon Wanafaran Kamara and Kamandian Camara continued and installed in Siby, and the soldiers came from all across Mande. During this period, they were informed that the troop of Soso was stationed in Bantan (a former boundary village), and the decision was taken to attack them.

Sounjata left Sibi with a campaign and Manden Mori was part of them to Bantan, they arrived there earlier in the morning and attacked the city as they were sleeping, and most of Soso's army that was stationed there was killed, wounded and arrested. But God bless Soumaoro and a part of the elite that was presented. So Soumaoro started to prepare the final general mobilization across Soso and allies, and Soundiata and friends (Wana faran, Bori, and Kamandian Camara) started another general mobilization across Mande, which took place in Kirina. Bori was a leading general during Kirina's Battle.

== Donso ==
After the Kirina's battle, Maari Jada dismissed and appointed Bori as chief of the hunters. Bori left Niani and installed some parts of Kita.

He did many organisations of the Donsos discipline and hunting terms as it's actually practically all across Manden. Manden Mori also made no hunting area named "Nanfulaytu" which is located in the rainforest of southern Kourousa city.

There are kinds of singers named Serewa or (Donzo Sere) to glorify those who have a denomination due to hunting buffalo, lion, cheater, elephant and other dangerous wildlife as well as many. Notify their history and speech on their dead body which is called «Sinbonsi». There are many stories and legends which mentioned his name as he encountered the lion, buffalo and others. He is also the lord of the hunters of Mandeng, as they belleave that any hunter did betray or joined in love with a married wife, that Mande Bori would attack him, e.g.

Mande Bori is regarded as the progenitor of the branches of the Keita clan who live in the vicinity of Kouroussa, in Hamana and Kolonkana. His is regarded as having been hot-headed, and oral tradition claims he was cursed by his sister Sogolon Kolonkan for insulting her. The story of this curse, said to prevent his descendants from ever leading an army, is used as an explanation for the relationship between and relative status of Hamana, whose residents trace their lineage to Mande Bori, and Kangaba, whose residents trace their lineage to Sunjata.

In addition to his role in the Sunjata epic, Mande Bori is also a hero of hunters, and a legend claims he was born after his mother made a pact with a hunter spirit.

== Lineage ==
Mande Bori was the brother of Sunjata, the founder of the Mali Empire. Mande Bori and Sunjata shared a father, Maghan Kon Fatta, but whether they were full brothers or half brothers is unclear: some traditions regard Mande Bori as a son of Sunjata's mother Sogolon, whereas others regard him as the son of another of Maghan Kon Fatta's wives, Namandjé. It is also unclear whether he was the older or younger brother.

According to oral tradition, Mande Bori had at least one son, Faga Leye, who was the father of Mansa Musa. Under the Arabic form of his name Abu Bakr, Mande Bori is briefly mentioned by the 14th-century Arab historian Ibn Khaldun as Musa's ancestor.

Historian Francois-Xavier Fauvelle has proposed that Mansa Musa was in fact descended from Abu Bakr I, the son of a daughter of Sundiata. Under this interpretation, Abu Bakr's reign created a dynastic split, with Musa's successors eventually claiming descent from Mande Bori rather than a grandson by the female line.
