= Niani, Guinea =

Niani
- Village
- Location in Guinea
- Coordinates: 11°22′47″N 8°23′03″W
- Country: Guinea
- Region: Kankan Region
- Prefecture: Kankan Prefecture
- Time zone: UTC+0 (GMT)

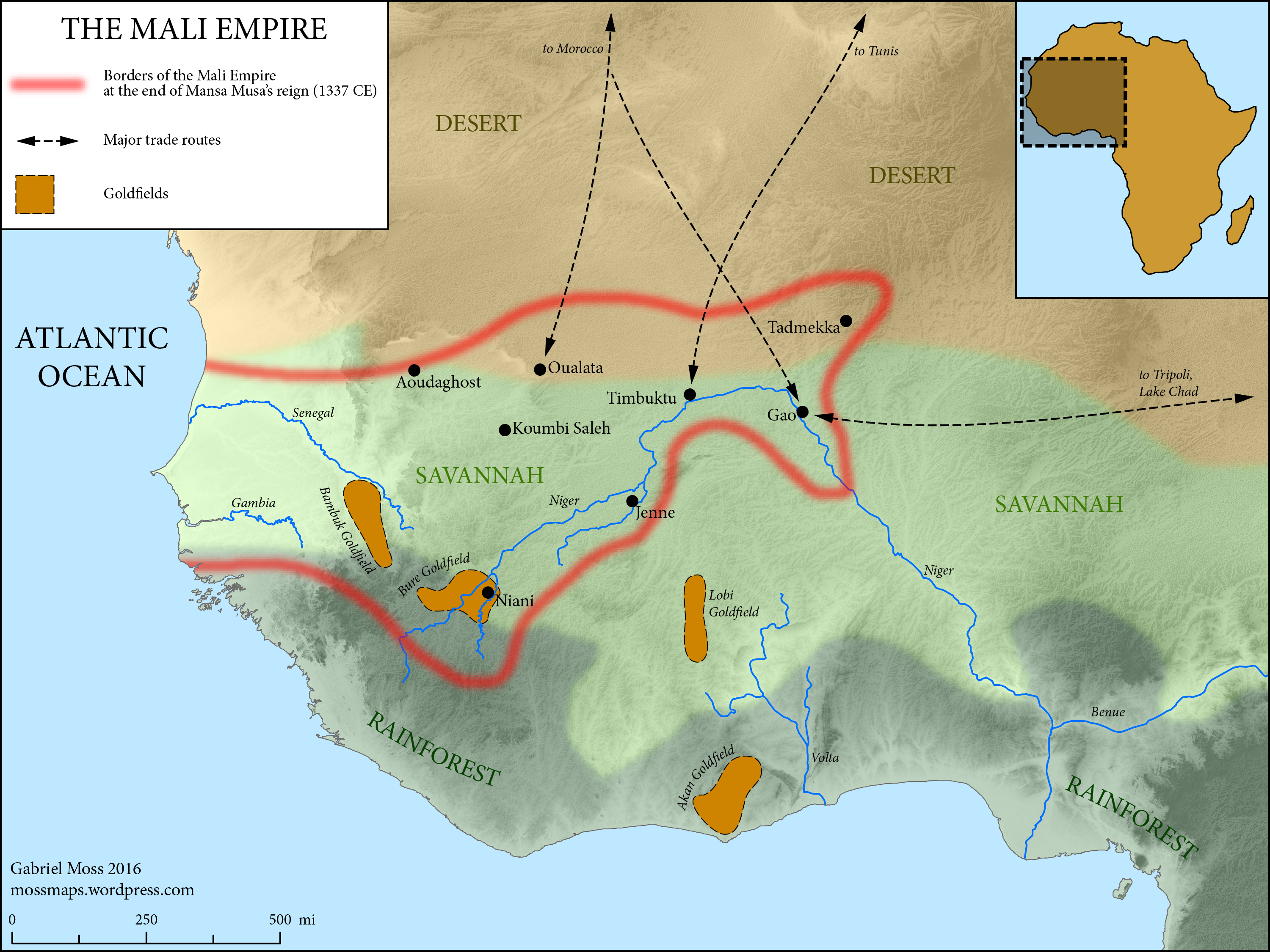
The Mali Empire in 1337, including the location of Niani, and the Bambuk, Bure, Lobi, and Akan goldfields

Niani is a village in Guinea. It is located in the Kankan Prefecture of the Kankan Region, in the east of the country. It lies on the left bank of the Sankarani River.

== Geography ==
The village is situated in extreme eastern Guinea, on the west bank of the Sankarani River. The river is accessible all year round and rocky peaks surround the village. The village is also on the edge of the forest, which is a source of gold, kola nuts, palm oil and ivory.

== History ==
Niani is often considered one of the ancient capitals of the Mali Empire. Some scholars believe that the village became the capital in the early 12th century after the former capital of Dioliba was abandoned. Niani is mentioned by the 16th-century traveler Leo Africanus. While some scholars believe that Kangaba was one of the capitals of the empire, others believe that Niani remained continuously the capital through the 14th to 16th centuries. 14th century Arab historian Shihab al-Umari reported the village as Nyeni (Niani), saying it is "the official name of Mali ... because it is the capital of the regions of this kingdom." Griots still exist in Niani today, preserving the history of the Mali Empire. Couriers left imperial Niani daily on horseback, and those who arrived from the provinces reported to the griot. Many Berber Arabs settled in Niani as a result of trans-Saharan trade.

The city had at least 100,000 inhabitants in the 14th century. The emperor (mansa) and his courtiers lived in Niani, which was a centre of trade and commerce. The town developed as an outlet for two main trade routes, one northward, called the 'Mande route' (Manding-sila), and one southward, called the 'Sarakolle route' (Sarakolle-sila). Niani and other principal cities housed a garrison for the imperial army. The Mansa had great forges in Niani.

The emperor Musa I of Mali employed the Andalusian architect Ishak al-Tuedjin to build an audience chamber at Niani. It was "square, surmounted by a cupola, which he covered with plaster and decorated with arabesques in dazzling colours." 14th-century North African historian Ibn Khaldun described it as an "admirable monument".

After the Mali Empire declined during the 1600s, Niani lost its importance and became a small town again.

In the 1920s, archaeological excavations were carried out at Niani by Vidal and Gaillard which first identified the site. In 1965 and 1968, Guinean-Polish archaeological missions were carried out. These excavations revealed that the area around Niani was once densely populated. Archaeologists have discovered that these dwellings were widely dispersed; around the royal town, there was a host of hamlets or villages for various trade clans: smiths, fishermen and so on. As a result of archaeological studies, the Arab quarter and royal town in Niani have been identified, specifically the foundations of stone houses, the mihrab of a mosque and the walls around the royal town. Al-Umari wrote that the buildings were made of bricks of beaten earth and that the "ceilings are made of beams and reeds. They are mostly in the shape of a cupola [conical] or a camel's hump, like vaulted arches. The floors of the houses are of earth mixed with sand ... The king has a group of palaces surrounded by a circular wall." Due to Niani's latitude, such buildings required constant repair and restoration.
