= Mansa Qu =

Mansa of the Mali Empire

Qu

Mansa of Mali
- Predecessor: Sakura
- Successor: Mohammad ibn Qu
- Died: c. 1305
- Religion: Islam

Qu (also transliterated Gao), known in oral sources as Kon Mamadi, was Mansa of the Mali Empire between roughly 1300 and 1305.

Qu assumed the throne following the murder of the usurper Sakura on his return from the hajj. Oral tradition says that Kon Mamadi killed him himself with the help of Sakura's daughter. His succession ended the succession disputes that had pitted the Gbara against the army/hunter's guild since Sundiata's death.

He ruled until 1305, when he was succeeded by his son Mohammad ibn Qu.

== See also ==
- Mali Empire
- Keita Dynasty

Preceded by Sakura	Mansa of the Mali Empire; 1300–1305	Succeeded by Mohammad
