= Ibn Fadlallah al-Umari =

14th century Arab historian and Mamluk statesman

- ابن فضل الله العمري
- Born: Shihab al-Din Abu al-Abbas Ahmad ibn Fadlallah al-Umari; 12 June 1301; Damascus, Mamluk Sultanate (modern-day Syria)
- Died: 1 March 1349 (aged 47); Damascus, Mamluk Sultanate
- Occupations: Historian, Geographer, Bureaucrat

Academic background
- Influences: Ibn Taymiyya

Academic work
- Era: Mamluk Sultanate
- Notable works: Masālik al-abṣār fī mamālik al-amṣār, at-Taʾrīf bi-al-muṣṭalaḥ ash-sharīf

Shihab al-Din Abu al-Abbas Ahmad Ibn Fadlallah al-Umari (Arabic: شهاب الدين أبو العبّاس أحمد بن فضل الله العمري, romanized: Shihāb al-Dīn Abū al-ʿAbbās Aḥmad ibn Faḍlallāh al-ʿUmarī), commonly known as Ibn Fadlallah al-Umari or Ibn Faḍl Allāh al-‘Umārī (1301 – 1349) was an Arab historian born in Damascus. His major works include at-Taʾrīf bi-al-muṣṭalaḥ ash-sharīf, on the subject of the Mamluk administration, and Masālik al-abṣār fī mamālik al-amṣār, an encyclopedic collection of related information. The latter was translated into French by Maurice Gaudefroy-Demombynes in 1927.

A student of Ibn Taymiyya, Ibn Fadlallah visited Cairo shortly after the Malian Mansa Kankan Musa I's pilgrimage to Mecca, and his writings are one of the primary sources for this legendary hajj. He recorded that the Mansa dispensed so much gold that its value fell in Egypt for a decade afterward, a story that is often repeated in describing the wealth of the Mali Empire.

He recorded Kankan Musa's stories of the previous mansa; Kankan Musa claimed that the previous ruler had abdicated the throne to journey to a land across the ocean, leading contemporary Malian historian Gaoussou Diawara to theorize that Abu Bakr II reached the Americas years before Christopher Columbus.

Gaudefroy-Demombynes believed that al-Umari wrote the Masalik al-Absar between 1342 and 1349, but internal evidence suggests that at least the chapter on Egypt and Syria and the section covering the Mali Empire were written in 1337-1338.

In March 1339, al-Umari was arrested following an altercation with the sultan, but al-Umari's father persuaded the sultan to spare him, and he was sentenced to house arrest. He subsequently had further conflict with the sultan and was imprisoned, but released in October. He subsequently moved to Damascus, and worked as a secretary there from August 1340 to May or June 1342.

== Works ==
- Ibn Faḍl Allāh al-‘Umārī, Masālik al-abṣār, éd. Sayyid
