= Uli I of Mali =

Mansa of Mali
- Predecessor: Sunjata
- Successor: Wati
- Issue: Qu
- Religion: Islam

Mansa Uli, (Note: The Arabic spelling is ولي, which can be read as Walī or Ūlī. Ibn Khaldun reports that the name is equivalent to Ali. Levtzion has interpreted the name as Walī, which resembles the name Ali more closely, but Conrad has noted that Ūlī is closer to the name Yérélin Kon recorded in oral tradition. Niane has rendered the name as Oulin.) also known as Yérélinkon, (Note: The name Yerelinkon is recorded from oral tradition. Recorded variants include Yérélin Kon, Dourounin Kon, Jurunin Kon, and Yerélinkong.) was the second mansa of the Mali Empire. He was the son and successor of Sunjata.

Uli was one of the greatest rulers of Mali. The 20th-century historian Nehemia Levtzion suggested that Uli may have been the first mansa of Mali to extend his rule to Walata, Timbuktu, and Gao, though Timbuktu and Gao are usually regarded as later additions to the empire. (Note: The primary sources attribute the conquest of Gao to Mansa Sakura or Mansa Musa, and the conquest of Timbuktu to Mansa Musa. They do not record Uli as having done so. Levtzion suggests that control of Timbuktu, and perhaps Gao, would have been necessary for Uli to go on the hajj, and that Mali struggled to keep control of Gao, resulting in the conflicting accounts of which mansa conquered it. The Timbuktu Chronicles claim that the founder of the Sonni dynasty, Ali Kolon, liberated Gao from Mali and that the fifth member of the Sonni dynasty was ruling during Musa's hajj, suggesting a long period of time elapsed between the initial conquest of Gao and Musa's reign.)

== Name ==
Mansa Uli's real name is Kon (The target), as his mother's name Jurunin was added as a prefix (Jurunin-Kon), people wrongly called him Yérélenkon. Because his body was clear, people called him Mansa Ulay, who was meant as the "red king".

== Haji ==
Uli went on the hajj at some point between 1260 and 1277. (Note: His hajj was during the reign of Baibars, which was from 1260 to 1277.)

Uli was apparently succeeded by his brother Wati, who is not attested by oral tradition. Some oral traditions assert that Uli was Sunjata's only biological son, though Sunjata may have adopted others.

=== Sousou's migration ===
When Yérélenkon became the emperor, he claimed that his father didn't retaliate well at the Soso Empire (actual Kolokani Circle). If he returned from his pilgrimage from Mecca, he would destroy the rest of them.

When the Soso's got information, they migrated to Jalon and confided in the Yalonke People. They remained there for many centuries until the Fulani's arrival in the seventeenth century, who changed their language from Mandingo to "proto-Yalonke" (Sousou's languages). During the Fulani's arrival, the Yalonkes shared the lands giving to the Soso people to Fulani's who made them Immigrate to the coastal area.

Uli had a son, Qu, who would gain the throne during the early 14th century.

== Bibliography ==
- Conrad, David C. (1994). "A Town Called Dakajalan: The Sunjata Tradition and the Question of Ancient Mali's Capital". The Journal of African History. 35 (3): 355–377. doi:10.1017/S002185370002675X. ISSN 0021-8537. S2CID 162273464.
- Ibn Khaldun, Kitab al-'Ibar
- Levtzion, N. (1963). "The thirteenth- and fourteenth-century kings of Mali". The Journal of African History. 4 (3): 341–353. doi:10.1017/S002185370000428X. JSTOR 180027. S2CID 162413528.
- Levtzion, Nehemia (1980) [1973]. Ancient Ghana and Mali. New York, N.Y: Africana Publishing Company. ISBN 0-8419-0431-6.
- Levtzion, Nehemia; Hopkins, John F. P., eds. (2000) [1981], Corpus of Early Arabic Sources for West Africa, New York, NY: Marcus Weiner Press, ISBN 1-55876-241-8.
- Niane, Djibril Tamsir (1959). "Recherches sur l'Empire du Mali au Moyen Age". Recherches Africaines (in French). OCLC 2425528. Archived from the original on 2007-05-19.
- Person, Yves (1981). "Nyaani Mansa Mamudu et la fin de l 'empire du Mali". 2: 613–653.

| Preceded by Sundiata Keita | Mansa of the Mali Empire; 1255–1270 | Succeeded by Ouati Keita |
