= William Desborough Cooley =

Irish geographer (c. 1795–1883)

William Desborough Cooley (c. 1795 – 1883) was an Irish geographer. Discoveries by European explorers gradually showed that a number of his theories about Central Africa, though strongly held, were incorrect. In other controversies his position is now considered to have had some justification. His major contributions are now seen as relating to source criticism of historical records, the understanding of West Africa, and as a perceptive historian of globalisation.

== Life ==
Cooley was born in Dublin, the son of William Cooley, a barrister, and grandson of Thomas Cooley the architect. He studied at Trinity College Dublin from 1811 to 1816. He was elected a fellow of the Royal Geographical Society (RGS) of London in 1830, being made an honorary free member in 1864. On the publication of Jean Baptiste Douville's Voyage au Congo in 1832, Cooley wrote an article in the Foreign Quarterly Review, which was instrumental in exposing the fraud practised by Douville.

After the Douville incident, Cooley became an influential figure for a time in the RGS. He proposed, working with William Fitzwilliam Owen, a naval expedition to East Africa. One set off under Captain James Alexander, but on calling at the Cape of Good Hope became involved in the Sixth Xhosa War, was diverted to South-west Africa, and proved financially burdensome for the RGS. Cooley's concrete plans for exploration never came to fruition. He also quarrelled with Alexander Maconochie, secretary of the RGS, and undermined his position there. His main achievement in the learned world was the foundation in 1846 of the Hakluyt Society.

Cooley held and defended strong views on the geography of Central Africa. He rejected the existence of snow-covered mountains there, even after Karl Klaus von der Decken and Richard Thornton's return from Mount Kilimanjaro in 1863. In 1864 he was still insisting that Lake Nyassa and Lake Tanganyika formed a single body of water.

A speaker of Kiswahili, which he had learned in London from a Zanzibari, Cooley was for many years supported almost solely by the civil list pension granted to him in 1859. He died on 1 March 1883.

== Works ==
Cooley wrote, for Lardner's Cabinet Cyclopædia, The History of Maritime and Inland Discovery, 3 vols. 1830–1. This book, a contribution to the history of globalisation, is now considered innovative and influential. It was the first work to have covered seriously the topic of communication between the different parts of the globe, and to have treated "exploration" as a historical process. It was translated into French, Dutch and Italian.

In 1852 Cooley published Inner Africa laid open, an attempt to trace the major lines of communication across the continent south of the Equator. In this work, relying based on Portuguese and African sources, he maintained that there existed just one great lake in Central Africa, and that the snowy mountains reported by Johann Ludwig Krapf and Johannes Rebmann were myths.

Cooley contributed to the Journal of the Royal Geographical Society, and wrote a series of controversial articles on African subjects to the Athenæum. With some treatises on geometry, he also published:

- The Negroland of the Arabs examined and explained; or, an Inquiry into the early History and Geography of Central Africa, London 1841. This work drew on Cooley's friendship with Pascual de Gayangos y Arce, in finding Arabic sources.
- An edition of Pierre Henri Larcher's Notes on Herodotus, 2 vols. 1844.
- The World surveyed in the XIX Century; or Recent Narratives of Scientific and Exploratory Expeditions translated, and, where necessary, abridged, 2 vols. London 1845–8.
- Sir Francis Drake, his Voyage, 1595, by Thomas Maynarde, edited from the original manuscripts for the Hakluyt Society, 1849.
- Claudius Ptolemy and the Nile; or an inquiry into that geographer's real merits and speculative errors, his knowledge of Eastern Africa, and the authenticity of the Mountains of the Moon, London 1854.
- Dr. Livingstone's Reise vom Fluss Liambey nach Loanda in 1853–4 kritisch und kommentarisch beleuchtet, 1855.
- The Memoir on the Lake Regions of East Africa reviewed, London 1864. In reply to Richard Francis Burton's letter in the Athenæum, No. 1899, which contradicted his theories, Cooley cast doubt on Burton's use of reports from Africans.
- Dr. Livingstone and the Royal Geographical Society, London 1874.
- Physical Geography, or the Terraqueous Globe and its Phenomena, London 1876.

== Notes ==
Attribution

This article incorporates text from a publication now in the public domain: Stephen, Leslie, ed. (1887). "Cooley, William Desborough". Dictionary of National Biography. Vol. 12. London: Smith, Elder & Co.
