= Mali Empire =

Empire in West Africa from c. 1235 to 1610

- c. 1235–1610
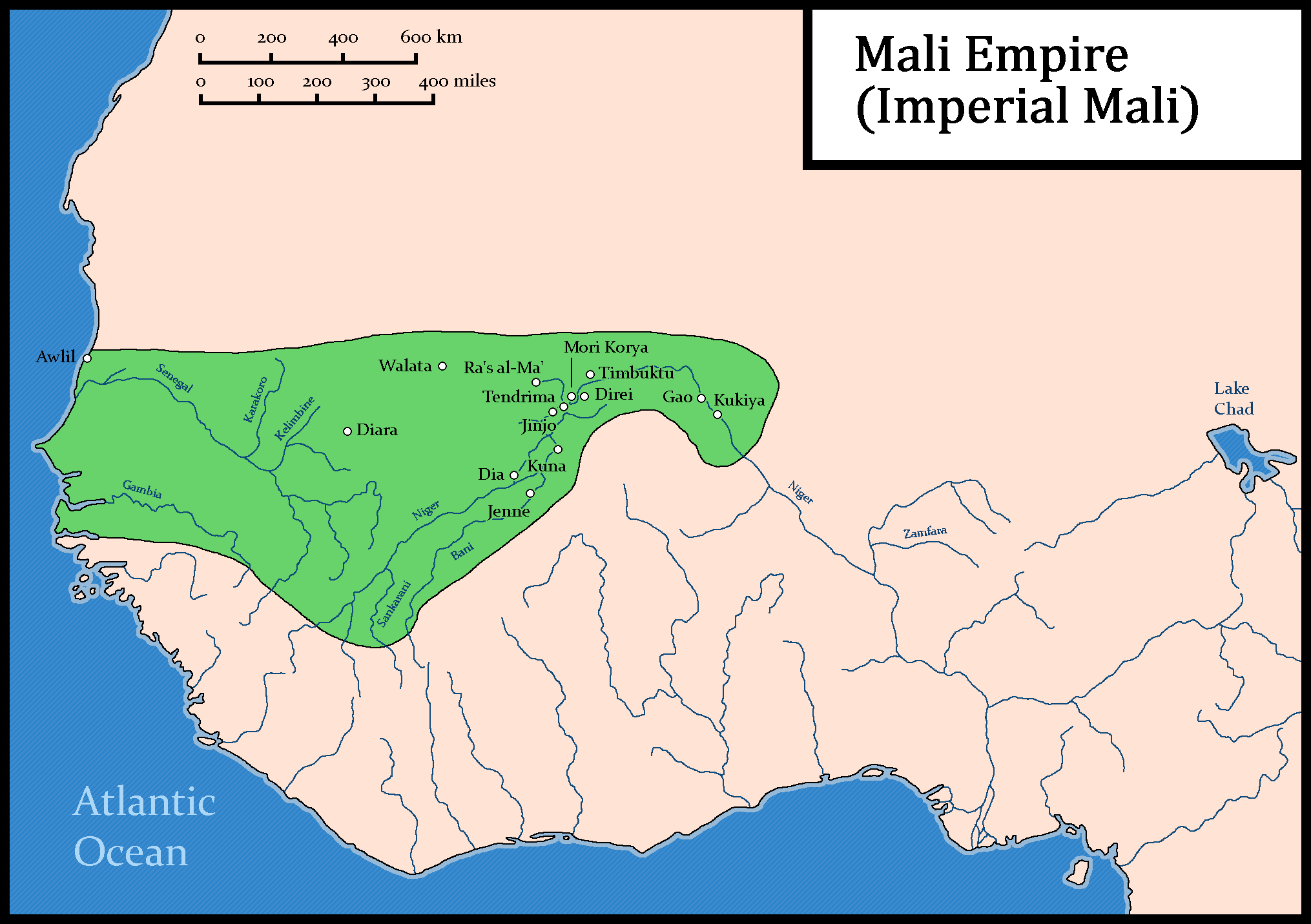
- Territory of the Mali Empire
- Capital: Location disputed - See § Capital location
- Common languages: Manding
- Religion: Traditional African religion; Islam
- Government: Hereditary parliamentary elective monarchy
- Mansa
  - 1235–1255: Mari Djata I (first)
  - 1312–1337: Musa I
  - c. 17th century: Mahmud IV (last)
- Legislature: Gbara
- Historical era: Postclassical Era to Early Modern Era
  - Conquest of Sosso: c. 1235
  - State divided among Emperor Mahmud Keita IV's sons: 1610

Area
- 1250: 100,000 km^{2} (39,000 sq mi)
- 1350: 1,300,000 km^{2} (500,000 sq mi)
- 1380: 1,100,000 km^{2} (420,000 sq mi)
- 1500: 400,000 km^{2} (150,000 sq mi)
- Currency: Gold dust (Salt, copper, silver and cowries were also common in the empire)
Preceded by
Sosso Empire
Ghana Empire
Gao Empire
Pre-Imperial Mali
Succeeded by
Songhai Empire
Jolof Empire

The Mali Empire (Note: Manding: Mandé or Manden Duguba; Arabic: مالي, romanized: Mālī) (Note: Other names for the empire include Malinke, Malinké, and Mandingo.) was an empire in West Africa from c. 1235 to 1610. The empire was founded by Sundiata Keita (c. 1214 – c. 1255) and became renowned for the wealth of its monarchs, especially Mansa Musa (Musa Keita). At its peak, Mali was the largest empire in West Africa, widely influencing the culture of the region through the spread of its language, laws, and customs.

The empire began as a small Mandinka kingdom at the upper reaches of the Niger River, centered around the Manding region. It began to develop during the 11th and 12th centuries as the Ghana Empire, or Wagadu, declined and trade epicentres shifted southward. The history of the Mali Empire before the 13th century is unclear, as there are conflicting and imprecise accounts by both Arab chroniclers and oral traditionalists. The first ruler for which there is accurate written information is Sundiata Keita, a warrior-prince of the Keita dynasty who was called upon to free the local people from the rule of the king of the Sosso Empire, Soumaoro Kanté. The conquest of Sosso in c. 1235 marked the emergence of Mali as a major power, with the Kouroukan Fouga as its constitution.

Following the death of Sundiata Keita, in c. 1255, the kings or emperors of Mali were referred to by the title mansa. In 1285, Sakura, a former slave of the imperial family who had risen to the rank of general, carried out a military coup. After his death, the lineage of the Keita dynasty was restored with the accession of Mansa Gao (c. 1300–1305). Mansa Musa took the throne in c. 1312. He made a famous pilgrimage to Mecca from 1324 to 1326, where his generous gifts and his expenditure of gold caused significant inflation in Egypt. Maghan I succeeded him as mansa c. 1337, but was deposed by his uncle Suleyman in 1341. It was during Suleyman's 19-year reign that Ibn Battuta visited Mali. Suleyman's death marked the end of Mali's Golden Age and the beginning of a slow decline.

The Tarikh al-Sudan records that Mali was still a sizeable state in the 15th century. At that time, the Venetian explorer Alvise Cadamosto and Portuguese traders confirmed that the peoples who settled within Gambia River were still subject to the mansa of Mali. Upon Leo Africanus's visit at the beginning of the 16th century, his descriptions of the territorial domains of Mali showed that it was still a kingdom of considerable size. However, from 1507 onwards neighboring states such as Diarra, Great Fulo, Yatenga, and the Songhai Empire chipped away at Mali's borders. In 1544/45, the Songhai invaded the capital but were unsuccessful in conquering the empire. Mali made a brief comeback in the late 16th century and was poised to take advantage of Songhai's collapse after the 1593 Moroccan invasion, but a disastrous defeat outside Djenne in 1599 ended those hopes. After that, the empire rapidly disintegrated, being replaced by independent chiefdoms. The Keitas retreated to the town of Kangaba, where they became provincial chiefs.

== Historiography ==
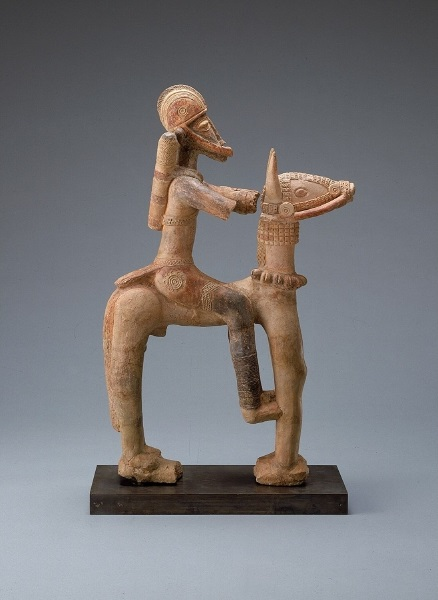
Terracotta figurine of an equestrian figure, circa 13th-15th century

Much of the recorded information about the Mali Empire comes from 14th century Tunisian historian Ibn Khaldun, 14th century Moroccan traveller Ibn Battuta and 16th century Andalusian traveller Leo Africanus. The other major source of information comes from Mandinka oral tradition, as recorded by storytellers known as griots. Imperial Mali is also known through the account of Shihab al-'Umari, written in about 1340 by a geographer-administrator in Mamluk Egypt. His information about the empire came from visiting Malians taking the hajj, or pilgrim's voyage to Mecca. He had first-hand information from several sources, and from a second-hand source he learned of the visit of Mansa Musa. The traveller Ibn Battuta, who visited Mali in 1352 left the first account of a West African kingdom made directly by an eyewitness; the others are usually second-hand. The third great account is that of Ibn Khaldun, who wrote in the early 15th century. While the accounts are of limited length, they provide a fairly good picture of the empire at its height.

After Ibn Khaldun's death in 1406, there are no further Arab primary sources except for Leo Africanus, who wrote more than a century later. Arab interest in the Mali Empire declined after the Songhai conquered the northern regions of the empire which formed the primary contact between Mali and the Arab world. For the later period of the Mali Empire, the major written primary sources are Portuguese accounts of the coastal provinces of Mali and neighboring societies.

=== Etymology of Mali ===
Mali, Mandé, Manden, Mande-Bissa, and Manding are all various pronunciations of the same word across different languages and dialects. The version recorded by medieval Arab geographers is Mali (Arabic: مالي, romanized: Mālī). Mali is the Fula form of the word. In the Manding languages, the modern descendants of the language spoken at the core of the Mali Empire, Manden or Manding is the name of the region corresponding to the heartland of the Mali Empire.

Medieval sources are divided over whether Mali is the name of a town or a region. Ibn Battuta who visited the capital city from 1352 to 1353, called it Mali. The 1375 Catalan Atlas portrayed a "city of Melly" (Catalan: ciutat de Melly) in West Africa. Leo Africanus said that the capital city was called Melli. However, Ibn Fadlallah al-Umari gives Mali as the name of the capital province and Ibn Khaldun refers to Mali as a people, with each giving different names for the capital city itself. Whether Mali originated as the name of a town or region, the name was subsequently applied to the entire empire ruled from Mali.

Another hypothesis suggests that the name Mali is derived from Mandé mali "hippopotamus", an animal that had special significance to the Keitas, and that Mandé means "little manatee". A legend claims that Sunjata transformed into a hippopotamus. However, these hypotheses have been rejected by locals and are inconsistent with the apparent cognate status of Mali and Mandé.

== History ==
=== Pre-imperial Mali ===
The first Mande people entered the Manding region during the period of the Ghana Empire. The Manden city-state of Ka-ba (present-day Kangaba) served as the capital and name of the province. From at least the beginning of the 11th century, Mandinka kings ruled Manden from Ka-ba in the name of the Ghanas. The ruler was elected from among the heads of the major clans, and at this time had little real power. Wagadou's control over Manden ended in the 12th century. The Kangaba province, free of Soninké influence, splintered into twelve kingdoms with their own faama.

In approximately 1140 the Sosso Empire, often called Kaniaga, another former vassal of Wagadou, began conquering the lands of its old rulers. In 1203, the Sosso king and sorcerer Soumaoro Kanté came to power and reportedly conquered much of Manden.

=== Sundiata Keita ===
Sundiata Keita, born during the rise of Kaniaga, was the son of Niani's faama, Nare Fa (also known as Maghan Kon Fatta, meaning the handsome prince). Upon his father's death, he was forced into exile along with his mother and two sisters. After many years in exile, Sundiata led the combined armies of Mema, Wagadou and the Mandinka city-states in a revolt against the Kaniaga Kingdom around 1234. The combined forces of northern and southern Manden defeated the Sosso army at the Battle of Kirina in approximately 1235. Maghan Sundiata was declared mansa over all the 12 kingdoms in an alliance that became the Mali Empire. During his reign, Sundiata's generals continued to expand the empire's frontiers, reaching from Kaabu in the west, Takrur, Oualata and Audaghost in the north, and the Soninke Wangara goldfields in the south.

The transfer of power following Sunjata's death is unclear, but there was evidently a power struggle of some kind involving the gbara or great council and donson ton or hunter guilds. Some oral traditions agree with Ibn Khaldun in indicating that a son of Sunjata, named Yerelinkon in oral tradition and Wali in Arabic, took power as Sunjata's successor. Two more of Sundiata's sons would reign, as well as a grandson, before a former slave Sakura, seized power. He was able to stabilize the political situation in Mali. Under his leadership, Mali conquered new territories and trade with North Africa increased.

=== Height of power ===
After Sakura's death, power returned to the line of Sunjata, with Qu taking the throne. He was succeeded by his son Muhammad, who launched two voyages to explore the Atlantic Ocean. (Note: There is some ambiguity over the identity of the mansa responsible for the voyages. The voyage is often incorrectly attributed to a Mansa Abu Bakr II, but no such mansa ever reigned. The account of the voyage does not mention the mansa by name, only indicating that it was Musa's immediate predecessor. According to Ibn Khaldun, Musa's immediate predecessor was Muhammad.) After the loss of the first expedition, Muhammad led the second expedition himself. He left his cousin Kanku Musa in charge during his absence. Eventually, due to Muhammad's failure to return, Musa was recognized as mansa in approximately 1312.

The reign of Kankan Musa, better known as Mansa Musa, is considered the golden age of Mali. A devout and well-educated Muslim, he took an interest in the scholarly city of Timbuktu, which he peaceably annexed in 1324, and transformed Sankore from an informal madrasah into an Islamic university. Mansa Musa Keita's crowning achievement was his famous 1324 pilgrimage to Mecca. Accounts of how many people and how much gold he spent vary. All of them agree that he took a very large group of people; the mansa kept a personal guard of some 500 men, and he gave out so many alms and bought so many things that the value of gold in Egypt and Arabia depreciated for twelve years. When he passed through Cairo, historian al-Maqrizi noted "the members of his entourage proceeded to buy Turkish and Ethiopian slave girls, singing girls and garments, so that the rate of the gold dinar fell by six dirhams." In addition to his famous hajj, Musa built mosques and palaces in Timbuktu and Gao, and took control of the valuable salt mine of Taghazza.

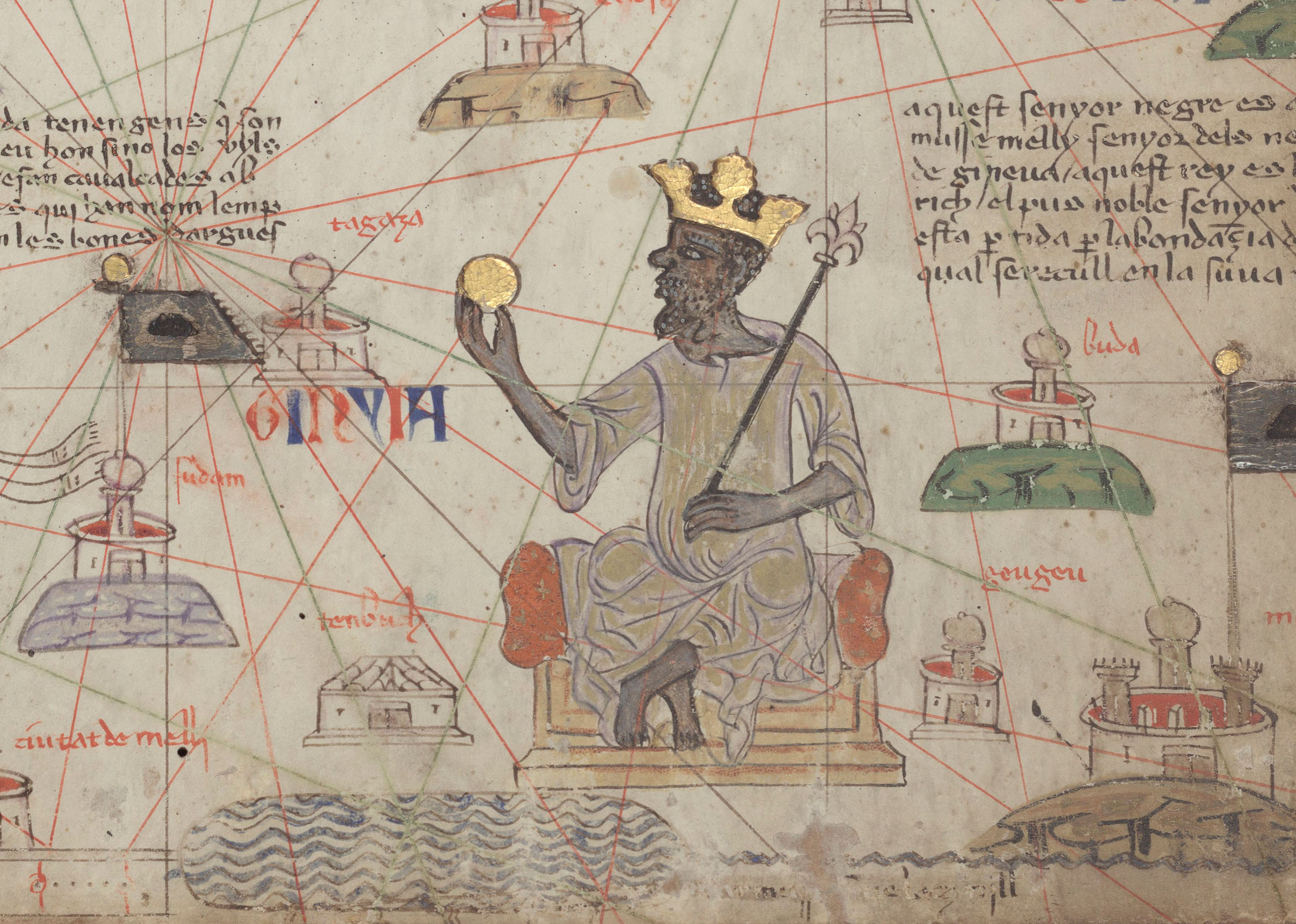
Musa depicted holding a gold coin in the 1375 Catalan Atlas

Mansa Musa's son Maghan I ruled for only a few years before being succeeded (or overthrown) by his uncle Sulayman. Sulayman's reign continued Mali's golden age, as attested by the writer Ibn Battuta who arrived in Mali in July 1352, and he made a successful hajj, kept up correspondence with Morocco and Egypt.

Upon Sulayman's death in 1360, the empire was ruled by a string of short-lived, cruel, or incompetent rulers. The kankoro-sigui held increasing influence as a power behind the throne. During this period the Jolof Empire was founded, and soon dominated all of northern Senegambia. In the 1370s a war between Mali imperial forces and Berber Tuareg forces from Takedda devastated the city of Gao. The area around it became independent of Malian control around this time. Still, by the time of Mansa Musa Keita II's death in 1387, Mali was financially solvent and in control of all of its previous conquests except Gao and Dyolof. Forty years after the reign of Mansa Musa Keita I, the Mali Empire still controlled some 1,100,000 square kilometres (420,000 sq mi) of land.

=== Decline ===
The late 14th century again saw a series of short reigns, often ending in palace coups. While maintaining a firm grip in the south and west, and even expanding in some areas, imperial control of their northernmost provinces was slipping, as attested by the Mossi raids on Macina. In 1433–1434, the Empire lost control of Timbuktu to the Tuareg, led by Akil Ag-Amalwal. Three years later, Oualata also fell into their hands. The rising Songhai Empire conquered Mema, one of Mali's oldest possessions, in 1465. It then seized Timbuktu from the Tuareg in 1468 under Sunni Ali Ber. In 1477, the Mossi emperor Naba Nasséré made yet another raid into Macina, this time conquering it and the old province of BaGhana (Wagadou).

In an attempt to stem the tide, Mansa Mahmud Keita II opened diplomatic relations with Portugal, receiving the envoys Pêro d'Évora and Gonçalo Enes in 1487. In 1493 he sent another envoy proposing an alliance against the threat of Tenguella, but this came to nothing. Songhai forces under the command of Askia Muhammad I defeated the Mali general Fati Quali Keita in 1502 and seized the province of Diafunu. In 1514, the Denianke dynasty was established in Tekrour and it was not long before the new kingdom of Great Fulo was warring against Mali's remaining provinces.

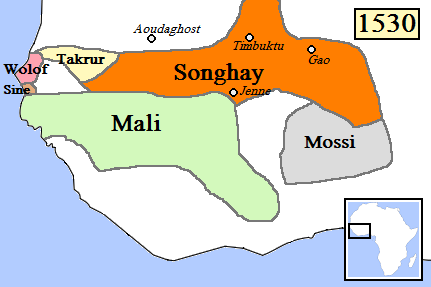
Mali Empire and surrounding states, c. 1530

In 1544 or 1545, (Note: 952 AH) a Songhai force led by kanfari Dawud, who later succeeded his brother Askia Ishaq as ruler of the Songhai Empire, sacked the capital of Mali and purportedly used the royal palace as a latrine. However, the Songhai did not maintain their hold on the Malian capital.

Mali's fortunes seem to have improved in the second half of the 16th century. Around 1550, Mali attacked Bighu in an effort to regain access to its gold. Songhai authority over Bendugu and Kala declined by 1571, and Mali may have been able to reassert some authority over them. The breakup of the Wolof Empire allowed Mali to reassert authority over some of its former subjects on the north bank of the Gambia, such as Wuli, by 1576.

=== Collapse ===
The end of the Mali Empire came in 1599, under the reign of Mansa Mahmud IV. The Songhai Empire had fallen to the Saadi Sultanate of Morocco eight years earlier, and Mahmud sought to take advantage of their defeat by trying to capture Jenne. Mahmud sought support from several other rulers, including the governor of Kala, Bukar. Bukar professed his support, but believing Mahmud's situation to be hopeless, secretly went over to the Moroccans. The Malian and Moroccan armies fought at Jenne on 26 April, the last day of Ramadan, and the Moroccans were victorious thanks to their firearms and Bukar's support, but Mahmud was able to escape. Around 1610, Mahmud Keita IV died. Oral tradition states that he had three sons who fought over Manden's remains. No single Keita ever ruled Manden after Mahmud Keita IV's death, resulting in the end of the Mali Empire.

== Government ==
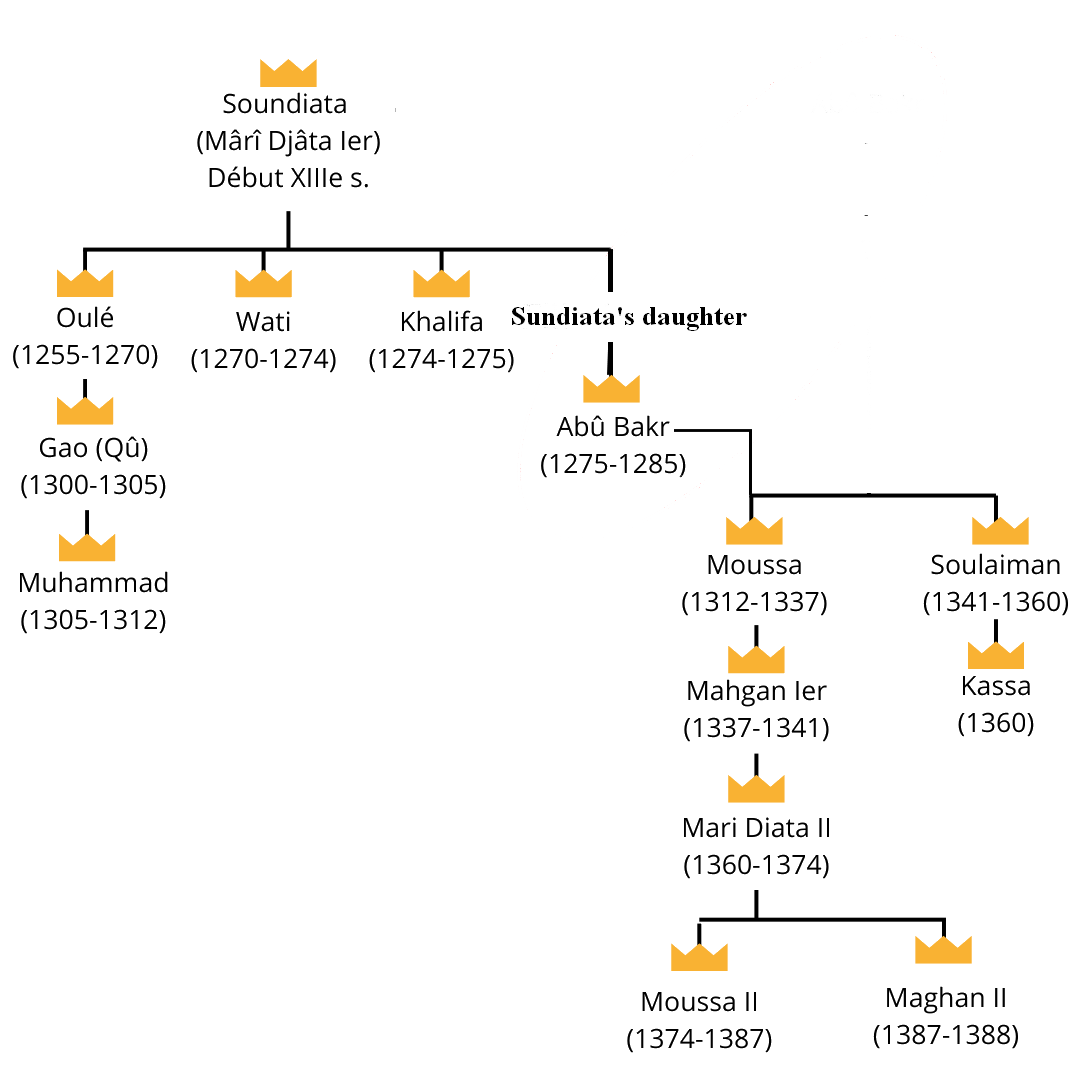
Presentation of the Genealogical tree presented by Professor Xavier Fauvelle which illustrate the most efficient succession tree of the Imperial Keita Dynasty

As founded by Mari Djata, it was composed of the "three freely allied states" of Mali, Mema and Wagadou plus the Twelve Doors of Mali.

The Twelve Doors of Mali were a coalition of conquered or allied territories, mostly within Manden, with sworn allegiance to Sundiata and his descendants. Upon stabbing their spears into the ground before Sundiata's throne, each of the twelve kings relinquished their kingdom to the Keita dynasty. In return for their submission, they became "farbas", a combination of the Mandinka words "farin" and "ba" (great farin). Farin was a general term for northern commander at the time. These farbas would rule their old kingdoms in the name of the mansa with most of the authority they held prior to joining the empire.

The Mansa held ultimate, unquestioned authority. Audiences with the monarch were governed by strict protocol. Conquered areas were ruled directly by the state through a farin (also called farin-ba or farba), essentially a military governor, chosen by the Mansa. Duties of the farin included managing the garrison, collecting taxes and customs duties, and controlling the local administration of justice. He could also take power away from the native administration if required and raise an army in the area for defence or putting down rebellions. This system tended to promote assimilation into the empire.

The mansa's second in command was a general, thought to have been chief of the armed forces. The santigui was the chief of the treasury and managed the royal granaries and valuable goods such as gold and gems. The griot played a very important role in the royal court. He was the tutor of princes and master of ceremonies, and served as an advisor to the king.

The mansa often liked to play the role "father of his people", dispensing justice himself in solemn sessions, and he listened personally to a subject's grievances against a farin. The post of farin was very prestigious, and his descendants could inherit it with the mansa's approval. The mansa could also replace a farin swiftly.

Most of the empire consisted of autonomous kingdoms of communities who recognized the Mansa's ultimate authority and paid tribute. At the local level (village, town and city), kun-tiguis (heads of family) elected a dougou-tigui (village-master) from a bloodline descended from that locality's founder. The county level administrators called kafo-tigui were appointed by the governor of the province. Only at the state or province level was there any real interference from the central authority. Provinces picked their own governors via their own custom (election, inheritance, etc.) and, regardless of their title in the province, were recognised as dyamani-tigui (province-master) by the mansa. Dyamani-tiguis had to be approved by the mansa and were subject to his oversight. If the mansa didn't believe the dyamani-tigui was capable or trustworthy, a farba might be installed to oversee the province or administer it outright.

Conquered territories that had proven quiescent could receive this level of autonomy rather than remain under direct rule, but territories that were crucial to trade or subject to revolt could and did lose this privilege as well and have a farin installed to rule over them.

Mali was densely populated with the Tarikh al-Sudan stating:

"The territory of Jenne is fertile and populated; many markets are held every day of the week. It is said there are 7077 villages [heavily disputed] situated very close to each other. The following will give an idea how close they are. If the Sultan, for example, wishes to summon an inhabitant of a village near Lake Debo, the messenger sent goes to one of the gates of the ram-parts and from there shouts the message he is to transmit. From village to village, people repeat the words and the message arrives almost immediately at its destination and the man in question goes to the meeting place"

=== Great Assembly ===
The Gbara or Great Assembly would serve as the Mandinka deliberative body and council of state until the collapse of the empire in 1645. Its first meeting, at the famous Kouroukan Fouga (Division of the World), had 29 clan delegates presided over by a belen-tigui (master of ceremony). The Kouroukan Fouga put in place social and economic reforms including prohibitions on the maltreatment of prisoners and slaves, installing documents between clans which clearly stated who could say what about whom. Also, Sundiata divided the lands amongst the people assuring everyone had a place in the empire and fixed exchange rates for common products.

The final incarnation of the Gbara, according to the surviving traditions of northern Guinea, held 32 positions occupied by 28 clans. It functioned as the ruler's cabinet, with different dignitaries given different portfolios (war, justice, economy, foreign relations, religion, etc.), and all major social groups of Mande society were represented.

=== Territorial administration ===
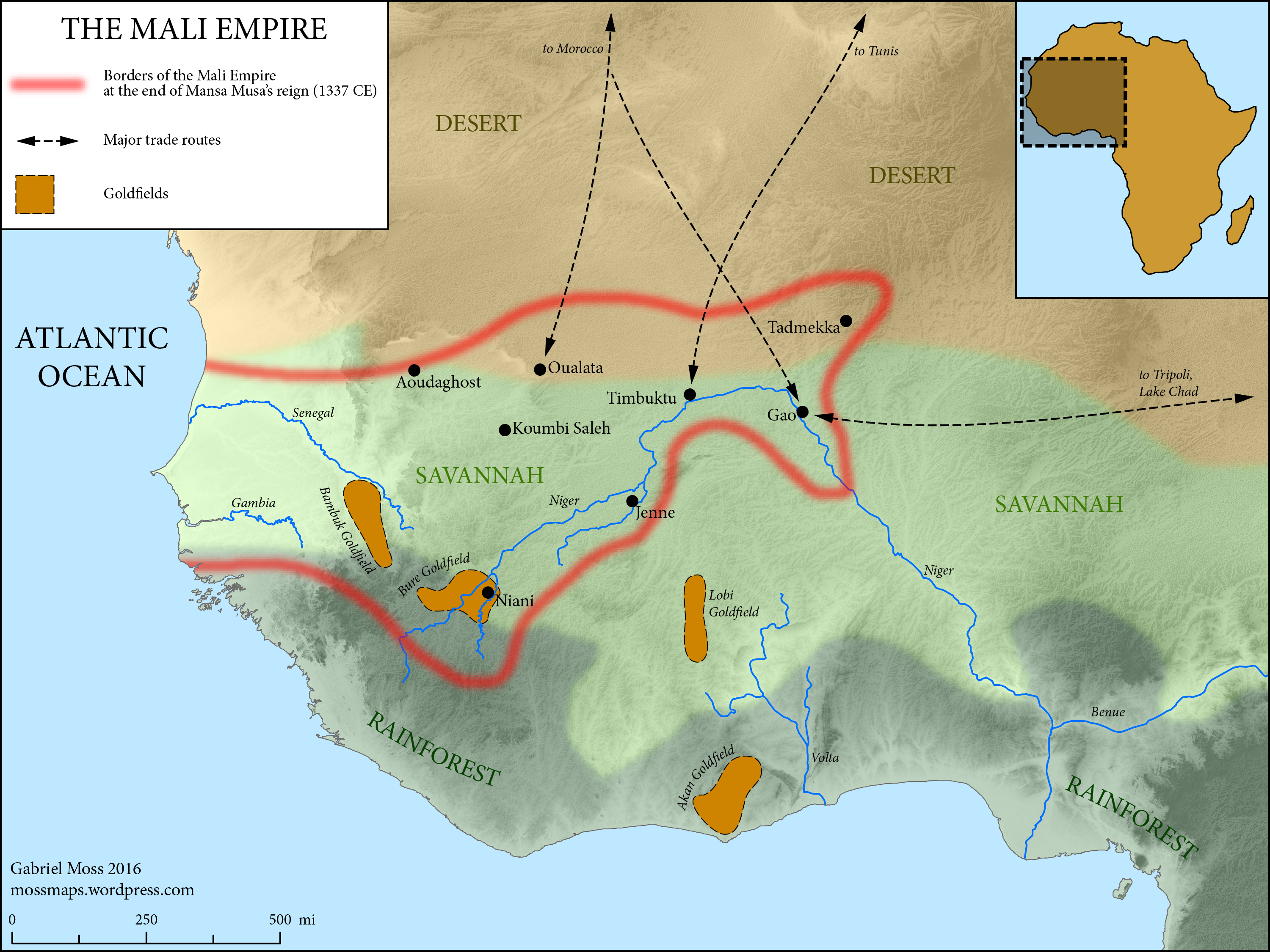
The Mali Empire in 1337, including the location of the Bambuk, Bure, Lobi and Akan Goldfields

The Mali Empire covered a larger area for a longer period of time than any other West African state before or since. What made this possible was the decentralised nature of administration throughout the state. According to Burkinabé writer Joseph Ki-Zerbo, the farther a person travelled from the capital, the more decentralised the mansa's power became. Nevertheless, the mansa managed to keep tax money and nominal control over the area without agitating his subjects into revolt. The Malian state balanced centralization and decentralization by dividing the empire into a series of provinces and vassal states that had been either conquered or annexed, respectively. These were administered in different ways.

The Mali Empire reached its largest area under the Abubakrids, the lineage of Mansa Musa. Al-Umari, who wrote down a description of Mali based on information given to him by Abu Sa’id 'Otman ed Dukkali (who had lived 35 years in the capital), reported the realm as being square and an eight-month journey from its coast at Tura (at the mouth of the Senegal River) to Muli. Umari also describes the empire as being south of Marrakesh and almost entirely inhabited except for few places. Mali's domain also extended into the desert. He describes it as being north of Mali but under its domination implying some sort of vassalage for the Antasar, Yantar'ras, Medussa and Lemtuna Berber tribes, with garrisons kept at Oualata, Timbuktu, Koumbi, and Gao, and responsibility of governing the Sahara given to the military commander (sura farin).

The empire's total area included nearly all the land between the Sahara Desert and coastal forests. It spanned the modern-day countries of Senegal, southern Mauritania, Mali, northern Burkina Faso, western Niger, the Gambia, Guinea-Bissau, Guinea, the Ivory Coast, and northern Ghana. By 1350, the empire covered approximately 478,819 square miles (1,240,140 km^{2}).

Al-ʿUmari reported that Mali had fourteen provinces. His list does not necessarily accurately reflect the actual organization of the Mali Empire, and the identification of the listed provinces is controversial. Several of the names are spelled in a variety of ways in different manuscripts. Al-ʿUmari's list, which is quoted with slight differences by al-Qalqashandi, is as follows:

- Ghana (Ghāna): Corresponds to the former Ghana Empire.
- Zafun (Zāfūn): Diafunu
- Tirafka (Tirafkā): (Note: Variant: Tiranka (Tirankā)) Probably the same as Tiraqqa, a town on the Niger between Timbuktu and Gao mentioned by several other sources. Alternatively, may be Tiringa, between Kayes and Nioro, or the same as trnqh, which may be Futa Toro.
- Takrur (Takrūr): On 3rd cataract of the Senegal River, north of Jolof. By the 14th century, the term Takrur had become commonly misused by Arab writers.
- Sanghana (Sanghāna): A region surrounding the mouth of the Senegal river. The name of the river may be derived from the name Sanghana.
- bānbʿw (Arabic: بانبعو) or bānbġw (Arabic: بانبغو): Possibly the Bambuk region, between the Senegal and Faleme rivers, which was a major source of gold, but identification is uncertain.
- Zarqatabana (Zarqaṭābanā)
- bytrā (Arabic: بيترا): (Note: Included in al-Qalqashandi's quotation of al-'Umari, but not in any manuscript of al-'Umari's text itself, which only list thirteen provinces despite saying there are fourteen.) Possibly a typographical error for Banbarā, referring to the Bambara people.
- Damura (Damūrā)
- Zagha (Zāghā): Dia. Ruled by a sultan who was a vassal of the Mansa of Mali.
- Kabura (Kāburā): Along the Niger upstream of Zagha. Like Zagha, ruled by a sultan who was a vassal of the Mansa of Mali. Identified with Diafarabé by Delafosse and Kaara (south of the Niger, opposite Kokry) by Bazin. Also spelled Kabara or Kabira; not to be confused with Kabara, Timbuktu's port on the Niger.
- Bawaghuri (Bawāghūrī): (Note: Variant spellings include brlġwry (Arabic: برلغوري) and brāġwdy (Arabic: براغودي)) Possibly Zagra (Zāgharī), ten days' travel south of Walata.
- Kawkaw (Kawkaw): The city of Gao, which was called Kawkaw by medieval Arabic sources. Formerly an independent kingdom, it was annexed into the Mali Empire by either Mansa Sakura or Mansa Musa. It later became the capital of the Songhai Empire.
- Mali (Mālī): The capital province, for which the empire gets its name. Al-'Umari reports that the capital itself, located in the province of Mali, was called byty. (Note: Al-Qalqashandi quotes al-'Umari as spelling it banbī, but this is actually how al-'Umari spells the name of the royal dais, not the capital.)

Other regions ruled by Mali included Beledougou, Kala, Bendugu and Sibiridugu. Al-ʿUmari also indicates that four Amazigh tribes were subjects of Mali:

- Yantaṣar or Kel Antasar: Located in the vicinity of the Adrar des Ifoghas.
- Tīn Gharās or Yantar'ras: Correspond to the modern Kel Gres. Located in the vicinity of Tadmekka in medieval times.
- Madūsa: Members of the Sanhaja confederation located on the Niger between Ghana and Tadmekka.
- Lamtūna: Members of the Sanhaja confederation in the vicinity of the Adrar Plateau and Tagant Plateau.

Gomez instead suggests that these tribes would have inhabited territory in the vicinity of Mema, Ghana, and Diafunu.

Ibn Khaldun reported that all the desert area known as the land of the veiled men was subject to Mali, and that Malian authority was adjacent to Ouargla.

=== Capital location ===
The identity of the capital city of the Mali Empire is a matter of dispute among historians. Scholars have located the capital in Niani, Guinea, or somewhere on the Niger, or proposed that it changed several times, that there was no true capital, or even that it lay as far afield as the upper Gambia River in modern-day Senegal. Seemingly contradictory reports written by Arab visitors, a lack of definitive archaeological evidence, and the diversity of oral traditions all contribute to this uncertainty. A particular challenge lies in interpreting early Arabic manuscripts, in which, without vowel markings and diacritics, foreign names can be read in numerous different ways (e.g. Biti, Buti, Yiti, Tati). Ibn Battuta and Leo Africanus both call the capital "Mali."

Early European writers such as Maurice Delafosse believed that Niani, a city on what is now the border between Guinea and Mali, was the capital for most of the empire's history, and this notion has taken hold in the popular imagination. Djibril Tamsir Niane, a Guinean historian, has been a forceful advocate of this position in recent decades. The identification of Niani as imperial capital is rooted in an (possibly erroneous) interpretation of the Arab traveler al Umari's work, as well as some oral histories. Extensive archaeological digs have shown that the area was an important trade and manufacturing center in the 15th century, but no firm evidence of royal residence has come to light.

Niani's reputation as an imperial capital may derive from its importance in the late imperial period, when the Songhai Empire to the northeast pushed Mali back to the Manding heartland. Several 21st century historians have firmly rejected Niani as a capital candidate based on a lack of archaeological evidence of significant trade activity, clearly described by Arab visitors, particularly during the 14th century, Mali's golden age. In fact, there is a conspicuous absence of archaeological samples of any kind from Niani dated to the late 13th through early 15th centuries, suggesting that Niani may have been uninhabited during the heyday of the Mali Empire.

Various sources cite several other cities as capitals of the Mali Empire, some in competition with the Niani hypothesis and others addressing different time periods. A city called Dieriba or Dioliba is sometimes mentioned as the capital or main urban center of the province of Mande in the years before Sundiata, that was later abandoned.

Many oral histories point to a town called Dakajalan as the original home of the Keita clan and Sundiata's childhood home and base of operations during the war against the Soso. It may have been located close to modern Kangaba. Mande bards in the region speak of the Dakajalan site, containing Sundiata's grave, as sacrosanct. Kangaba became the last refuge of the Keita royal family after the collapse of the Mali Empire, and so has for centuries been associated with Sundiata in the cultural imagination of Mande peoples. If Dakajalan was, in fact, situated near Kangaba, this may also have contributed to their conflation, beginning with Delafosse's speculation that the latter may have begun as a suburb of the former.

According to Jules Vidal and Levtzion, citing oral histories from Kangaba and Keyla, another onetime capital was Manikoro or Mali-Kura, founded after the destruction of Niani.

Parallel to this debate, many scholars have argued that the Mali Empire may not have had a permanent "capital" in the sense that the word is used today, and historically was used in the Mediterranean world. Rather, authority would rest with the mansa and his court, wherever he went. Therefore, Arabic visitors may have assigned the "capital" label merely to whatever major city the mansa was based out of at the time of their visit. It has been suggested that the name given in the Arabic sources for the capital of Mali is derived the Manding word "bambi", meaning "dais", and as such refers to the "seat of government" in general rather than being the name of a specific city. Such impermanent capitals are a historically widespread phenomenon, having occurred in other parts of Africa such as Ethiopia, as well as outside Africa, such as in the Holy Roman Empire.

=== Imperial regalia ===
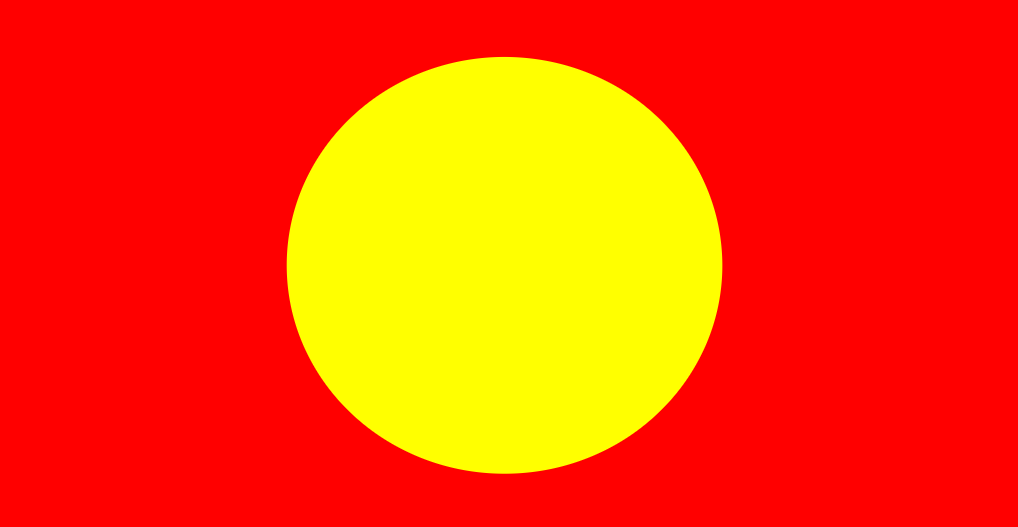
Two possible reconstructions of Malian imperial banners

The Mansas of Mali used several symbols to demonstrate their power and influence. A red banner struck with a golden disc, referred to as the 'Mali djondjon' or the 'Sun Banner' of Sundiata, appears in oral histories of his coronation. Written sources have Mansa Musa using a similar banner, 'with yellow symbols (shi’ār) on a red background', during his visit to Cairo, as well as a parasol.

Ibn Battuta records the Mansa using golden and silver lances as imperial regalia. Other royal items included a ruler's cap, slippers, arrows, and bow. The material of which they were made indicated the rank of the holder: gold was the highest, and reserved for the Mansa, followed in descending order by silver, brass, iron, and wood. The rulers of Kaabu held a silver lance, for example, while the king of Guinala, one of their subordinates, held a bow and arrows of iron.

== Society ==
=== Population ===
The population under Malian rule was very diverse due to its size with some contrast between the more islamiced northerners and the more animist southern inhabitants, though this division was very blurry. Ibn Battuta (1304–1369) praised the safety of the empire noting that "One of their good qualities is their lack of oppression. They are the farthest removed of people from it and their sultan does not permit anyone to practice it. Another is the security embracing the whole country, so that neither traveler there nor dweller has anything to fear from thief to usurper." Its capital city of Niani had at least 100,000 inhabitants in the 14th century during its peak, and 60,000 during the beginning of the 16th century. By which point it was still "one of the most populous cities" in the region. Mali was densely populated with the Tarikh al-Sudan stating:

"The territory of Jenne is fertile and populated; many markets are held every day of the week. It is said there are 7077 villages [heavily disputed] situated very close to each other. The following will give an idea how close they are. If the Sultan, for example, wishes to summon an inhabitant of a village near Lake Debo, the messenger sent goes to one of the gates of the ram-parts and from there shouts the message he is to transmit. From village to village, people repeat the words and the message arrives almost immediately at its destination and the man in question goes to the meeting place."

And Mahmud Kati (1468–1552/93) in his Tarikh al-Fattash also stating that:

"It is said that Malli encompasses a region of four hundred towns and that its soil is extremely rich. Among the kingdoms of the sovereigns of the world, only the lands of Syria surpass it in beauty. It's inhabitants are rich and live comfortably."

Leo Africanus (1494–1554) who visited the region between 1510 and 1513 also wrote of the inhabitants being rich.

=== Intellectual life and education ===
A variety of things were taught ranging from Quranic studies, Arabic language, Belief/theology, mysticism, Hadith, Literature/Poetry, Jurisprudence and law, Ethics, Mathematics, Sciences, Medicine, and History, among other subjects. The education of children was valued with the Manden Charter written in 1235 at the establishment of the empire stating, "Children's education behooves the entire society. The paternal authority in consequence falls to everyone." Dia and Djenné were already major intellectual cities before the rise of Timbuktu, with Djenne having had 4,200 scholars residing in it alone by the year 1200, when the Great Mosque of Djenné was built. As Mali began to decline there were mass migrations of scholars from it who would go on to spread their knowledge and work. Such as 3,636 scholars who left Mali, led by Abd al-Rahmán Jakhite, in 1431 against the wishes of the emperor.

The development of Islamic learning in Timbuktu was officially encouraged by Mansa Musa (r.1312–1337), who is reported to have sent West African ‘ulama’ to study in Fez. This was continued at least until the end of Mali’s rule in Timbuktu in 1433, because Katib Misa, the last imam of the great Friday Mosque in Timbuktu under the rule of Mali, was among those who went to study in Fez. This aim was achieved, and a fagih who came to Timbuktu from the Hejaz (perhaps at the beginning of the fifteenth century) found the city ‘full of Sudanese figaha’, who surpassed him in [the knowledge of] fiqh’. So, he himself decided to travel to Fez to study figh there before he settled in Timbuktu. Leo Africanus made note of their professors and regarded Malians as "the most civilized, most intelligent, and most highly regarded of the blacks." Conte di Ottomano Freducci praised the "excellent mathematicians and men versed in the liberal arts" around 1529.

The Tarikh al-Sudan, retelling Timbuktu during the early 15th century under Malian rule, noted:

"At that time the town was thronged by Sūdāni students, people of the west [ie, the inland delta region] who excelled in scholarship and righteousness. People even say that, interred with him in his mausoleum (rawda), there are thirty men of Kābara, all of whom were righteous scholars."

=== Medical institutions and Medicine ===
André Thevet (1516–1590) who received his information from informants on the West African coast in 1555 made note of the physicians, hospitals, and medicine within Mali, and Timbuktu then under the Songhai Empire:

"Before proceeding further, I shall mention here something worthy of note: in these two kingdoms, Mely and Tobotu, there are the most learned and experienced physicians in the country, whom they call Bifrains and the Arabs of Africa Mtâeânsm Kttabeb, a proper name taken from one of the most excellent of their predecessors, as if one were to say Galenists or Hippocratists. The common Ethiopian and Abyssinian people call them, in their gibberish, Alkandeil, that is, “men who give light to the sick,” because the word Alkan signifies candle and light, or a lamp. And they are so honoured by both the poor and the rich that, after their King, or Almalcq, and the High Priest, called Albagra, they revere no one but these physicians; being, moreover, the people most fond of rare things in all Africa. Now no living man is permitted to practise this profession without being examined by the elders, who question them according to their books. Their interrogations concern the ailments that may affect each particular member, and especially the head, as the principal one, which they call Algofty or Ttafi; the hair, Achar; the forehead, Algoba; the temples, Algibim; and the ears, Almadem. Having questioned them for a month about the human body, both internally and externally, they proceed to simples, which they generally call Alhaixy, that is, herbs; and the flowers, leaves, roots, fruits, and seeds, Alatmardy, Zloadyo, Zlourochy, Alnoard. Once the candidates have answered the aforementioned Bifrains regarding all these matters, those found competent and capable in their responses are accepted. This practice is likewise observed by Persians, Arabs, Moors, and Indians, except in hospitals for men; it is not permitted in those for women and girls. The most common disease in this country is that which they call Borozaiu or Zail in Ethiopian; it stems solely from sexual promiscuity, to which they are highly prone. It affects the private part called Afaby in men and Ajfabor in women. To remedy this, they use various decoctions, particularly the herb illustrated here, called Achanaca..."

== Economy ==
=== Agriculture ===
The majority of the population were farmers, with this being the base of the economy, and food was abundant. Whilst cattle-rearing was a speciality of the Fulani, peoples of the Niger were raising sheep, goats, and cattle by the 14th century. The Bozo, Somono, and Sorko people specialised in fishing.

Mahmud Kati referencing the importance of agriculture to the empire during the 16th century:

“It is said that Malli encompasses a region of four hundred towns and that its soil is extremely rich. Among the kingdoms of sovereigns of the world, only the lands of Syria surpass it in beauty. Its inhabitants are rich and live very well, it suffices, to give some idea of its wealth, to make reference to the gold mines and plantations of the gura, which can be found there and which have no parallel in all of Takrur, except in the lands of Bergo [Borgu].”

=== Technologies ===
Iron was abundant and smiths manufactured farming tools and weapons. Shoemaker clans resided in the south. In the north weaving flourished, owing to cotton fields in regions such as Casamance, and the Soninke and Takrur peoples specially dyed their cloths indigo. Siaki (goldsmiths) were honoured.

Leo Africanus referencing the importance of industry and trade within the capital around 1510/13:

“Mali stretches along a branch of the Niger for a distance of perhaps three hundred miles. It borders on the preceding kingdom in the north, and in the south on a desert with arid mountains. In the west its limits are primitive forests that stretch to the ocean, while in the east it borders the territory of Gao. In this country there is a very large village of nearly six thousand homes, which is called Mali. It is from this village that the whole kingdom takes its name. The king and his court live there. The country has abundant grain, meat and cotton. In this village are a great number of craftsmen and merchants, both local and foreign... The inhabitants are rich on account of their trade, as they furnish Ghana and Timbuktu with many products."

=== Trade ===
Trade was a significant factor to the rise and success of Mali. Its height coincided with the period when Timbuktu came under the Mansa's control. The empire taxed every ounce of gold, copper and salt that entered its borders, with kola nuts also bearing importance. By the 14th century, a pax mandinka reigned in West Africa, allowing trade to flourish.

There was no standard currency throughout the realm, but several forms were used. The Sahelian and Saharan towns of the Mali Empire were staging posts in the long-distance caravan trade and trading centres for various West African products. At Taghaza, for example, salt was exchanged; at Takedda, copper. Ibn Battuta observed the use of slaves in both towns. During most of his journey, Ibn Battuta travelled with a retinue that included slaves, most of whom carried goods for trade. On the return from Takedda to Morocco, his caravan transported 600 female slaves, suggesting that slavery was a substantial part of the commercial activity of the empire.

=== Gold ===
Mali's wealth in gold did not primarily come from direct rule of gold-producing regions, but rather from tribute and trade with the regions where gold was found. Gold nuggets were the exclusive property of the mansa and were illegal to trade within his borders. All gold was immediately handed over to the imperial treasury in return for an equal value of gold dust. Gold dust had been weighed and bagged for use at least since the time of the Ghana Empire. Mali borrowed the practice to stem inflation, since it was so prominent in the region. The most common measure for gold within the realm was the mithqal (4.5 grams of gold). This term was used interchangeably with dinar, though it is unclear if coined currency was used in the empire. Gold dust was used all over the empire, but was not valued equally in all regions.

By the beginning of the 14th century, Mali was the source of almost half the Old World's gold exported from mines in Bambuk, Boure, and Galam. Gold mines in Boure, which is located in present-day Guinea, were discovered sometime near the end of the 12th century. Archeological evidence near the town of Tadmekka shows the Maliens had a unique process of purifying gold not used in other parts of the world. They would mix material with glass and melt it; since gold is inert, impurities would melt with the glass, leaving behind pure gold.

=== Salt ===
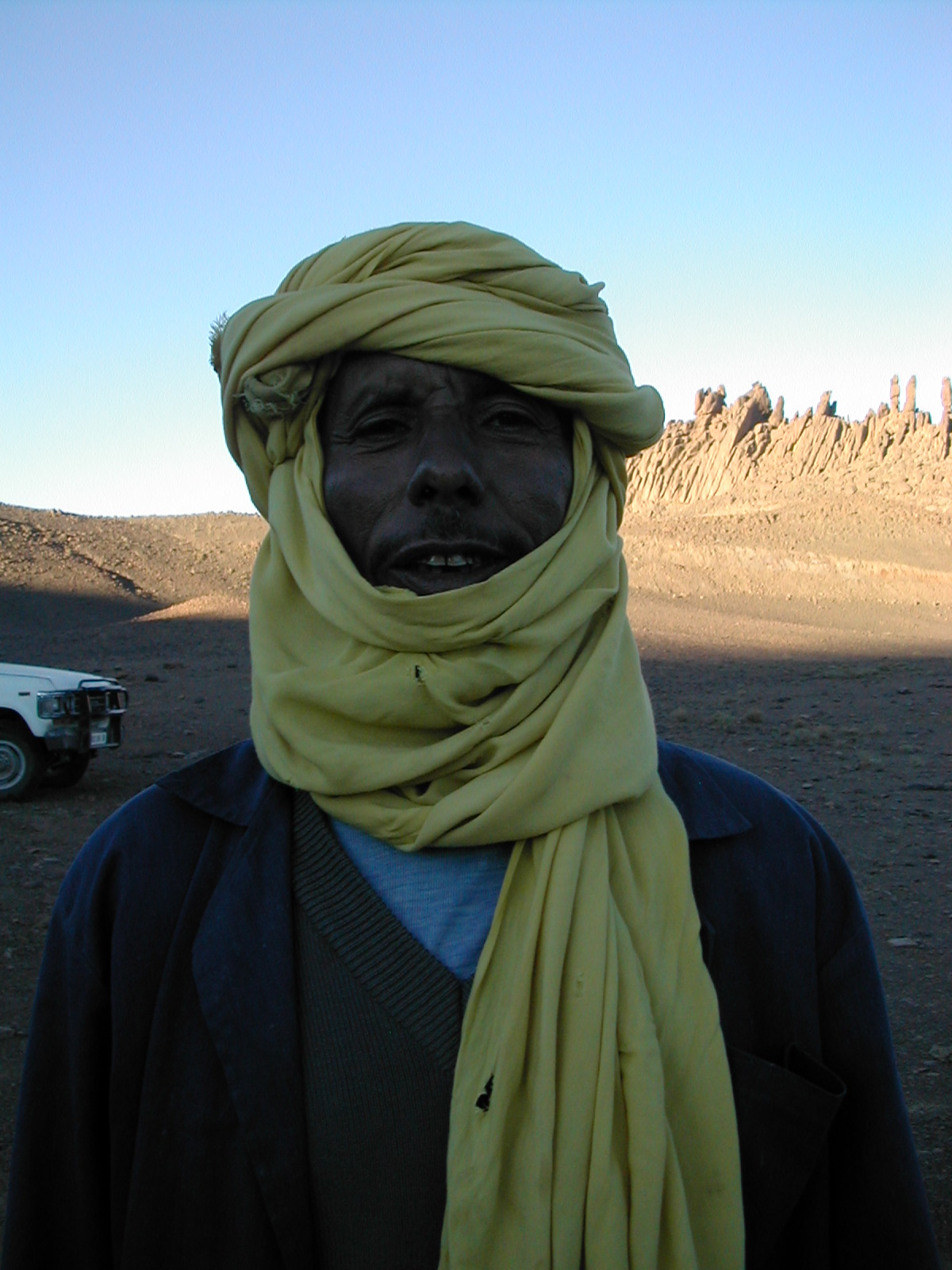
Tuaregs were and still are an integral part of the salt trade across the Sahara.

Salt, another critical trade good, was as valuable, if not more valuable, than gold in sub-Saharan Africa. It was cut into pieces and spent on goods with close to equal buying power throughout the empire. Salt prices rose the further south it was transported, by the time it reached the southern forests of lower West Africa it was worth its weight in gold. Every year merchants entered Mali via Oualata with camel loads of salt to sell in the capital. Ibn Battuta had written that in Taghaza, one of Mali's most important salt mines, there were no trees, only sand and the salt mines. Nobody lived in the area except the Musafa servants who dug the salt and lived on dates imported from Sijilmasa and the Dar'a valley, camel meat and millet imported from the Sudan. The buildings were constructed from slabs of salt and roofed with camel skins. The salt was dug from the ground and cut into thick slabs, two of which were loaded onto each camel where they would be taken south across the desert to Oualata and sold. The value of the salt was chiefly determined by the transport costs. According to Ibn Battuta one camel load of salt sold at Walata for 8–10 mithqals of gold, but in Mali proper it was worth 20–30 ducats and sometimes even 40.

=== Copper ===
Copper was also a valued commodity in imperial Mali. According to Ibn Battuta, copper was mined from Takedda in the north and traded by the bar in the south for gold. Contemporary sources claim 60 copper bars traded for 100 dinars of gold. The Akan would trade gold for two thirds its weight in copper. Copper was also traded to Benin, Ife and Nri.

== Military ==
The number and frequency of conquests in the late 13th century and throughout the 14th century indicate the Kolonkan mansas inherited and/or developed a capable military. Sundjata is credited with at least the initial organisation of the Manding military. However, it went through radical changes before reaching the legendary proportions proclaimed by its subjects. As a result of steady tax revenue and stable government beginning in the last quarter of the 13th century, the Mali Empire was able to project its power throughout its own extensive domain and beyond. It had a well-organised army with an elite corps of horsemen and many foot soldiers in each battalion. An army was required to guard the borders to protect its flourishing trade. Evidence of cavalry in terracotta figures suggest the empire's prosperous economy as horses are not indigenous to Africa.

=== Strength ===
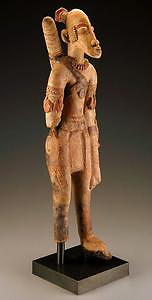
Terracotta archer figure from Mali (13th to 15th centuries)

The Mali Empire maintained a semi-professional, full-time army in order to defend its borders. The entire nation was mobilised, with each clan obligated to provide a quota of fighting-age men. These men had to be of the horon (freemen) caste and appear with their own arms. Historians who lived during the height and decline of the Mali Empire consistently record its standing army peaking at 100,000, with 10,000 of that number being made up of cavalry. With the help of the river clans, this army could be deployed throughout the realm on short notice. Numerous sources attest that the inland waterways of West Africa saw extensive use of war canoes and vessels used for war transport where permitted by the environment. Most West African canoes were of single-log construction, carved and dug out from one massive tree trunk.

=== Order of battle ===
The army of the Mali Empire during the 14th century was divided into northern and southern commands led by the Farim-Soura and Sankar-Zouma, respectively. Both of these men were part of Mali's warrior elite known as the ton-ta-jon-ta-ni-woro ("sixteen carriers of quivers"). Each representative or ton-tigi ("quiver-master") provided counsel to the mansa at the Gbara, but only these two ton-tigi held such wide-ranging power.

The ton-tigi belonged to an elite force of cavalry commanders called the farari ("brave men"). Each individual farariya ("brave") had a number of infantry officers beneath them called kèlè-koun or dùùkùnàsi. A kèlè-koun led free troops into battle alongside a farima ("brave man") during campaign. A dùùkùnàsi performed the same function except with slave troops called sofa ("guardian of the horse") and under the command of a farimba ("great brave man"). The farimba operated from a garrison with an almost entirely slave force, while a farima functioned on field with virtually all freemen.

=== Equipment ===
The army of the Mali Empire used of a wide variety of weapons depending largely on where the troops originated. Only sofa were equipped by the state, using bows and poisoned arrows. Free warriors from the north (Mandekalu or otherwise) were usually equipped with large reed or animal hide shields and a stabbing spear that was called a tamba. Free warriors from the south came armed with bows and poisonous arrows. The bow figured prominently in Mandinka warfare and was a symbol of military force throughout the culture. Bowmen formed a large portion of the field army as well as the garrison. Three bowmen supporting one spearman was the ratio in Kaabu and the Gambia by the mid-16th century. Equipped with two quivers and a knife fastened to the back of their arm, Mandinka bowmen used barbed, iron-tipped arrows that were usually poisoned. They also used flaming arrows for siege warfare. While spears and bows were the mainstay of the infantry, swords and lances of local or foreign manufacture were the choice weapons of the cavalry. Ibn Battuta comments on festival demonstrations of swordplay before the mansa by his retainers including the royal interpreter. Another common weapon of Mandekalu warriors was the poison javelin used in skirmishes. Imperial Mali's horsemen also used iron helmet and mail armour for defence as well as shields similar to those of the infantry.

== Religion ==
Djibril Tamsir Niane has advanced the claim that, based on some griot accounts, the Keita dynasty claims descent from a man called "Lawalo", whom Niane claim was one of the sons of Bilal, the faithful muezzin of Islam's prophet Muhammad. The original epos, however, tends to portray Sundiata as a powerful sorcerer and hunter, rather than a devout Muslim. Griots and Niane also claim that his descendants founded and led the donso-ton, the powerful hunter's brotherhood of Mande that was thoroughly steeped in local animist ritual. This ambiguity and dualistic belief system was a fundamental feature of the Mali Empire, as it was for many other Sahel states up until the 19th century. Religious life in the Mali Empire was divided between animist and Islamic belief systems, but the boundary was blurry and porous, if it existed at all. The northern parts of the empire on the edge of the Sahara desert tended to be more Islamicized, while traditional African religion dominated in the south. The ruling family's traditions reflect this, cultivating an image as both longstanding Muslims and powerful "sorcerers" on the model of the Kòmò society.

Fage notes that, Islam was present in Mande by at least the 10th century. If one is to believe Al-Bakri, a king of Malal was converted to Islam when a marabout produced a miraculous shower of rain that ended a drought, and the ruler's descendants and his nobles kept Islam, although the common people were not converted. Ibn Khaldun named the first Muslim king Barmandana. These conversion stories do not necessarily mean that early Mande was an Islamic state, however. Al-Bakri's story, if true, presumably applied only to one of the local rulers of the balkanized region, and any claims to longstanding Muslim status could be a later invention to give increased prestige to the royal family.

Some historians posit that Sundiata Keita, founder of the Empire, followed the tenets of Traditional African religion just like his subjects. Others claim that he may have been nominally or superficially Muslim. During his reign, Mansa Musa bestowed rewards on a marabout named Mudrik b. Fakkûs in gratitude for his ancestor who had supposedly converted Musa's ancestor 'Sarik Djata', probably Sundiata. But the deeply pagan themes permeating the Epic of Sundiata reflect his times, and his practice of Islam was probably syncretic at best, if he practiced at all. The emperor had to serve as both a pious sultan for his Muslim subjects and as the malimansa, protected by the spirits, for his pagan subjects. Religiously mixed public ceremonies at Mansa Suleyman's court as recorded by ibn Battuta reflect this. The hajj pilgrimage, undertaken by mansas Wali, Sakura, and Musa, mirrored the dali-ma-sigi, a hunter's spiritual quest to forge an alliance with the secret powers of the wild bush. Mansa Musa is generally considered the archetypal Muslim Mansa: besides his famous pilgrimage, he also built numerous mosques and madrasas, and encouraged the practice of Islam at his court. But in oral tradition he is lauded as the king who brought important boliw (sacred objects) from Mecca for use in the Kòmò rituals.

Under Malian rule, towns like Dia and Goundiourou enjoyed a degree of theocratic self-rule, where only Islamic law applied. These were Jakhanke centers following Al-Hajj Salim Suwari's quietist beliefs.

== Legacy ==
The Mali Empire had a massive effect on the development of West Africa societies even well after its peak. Its expansion spread Mande culture and the Mande languages from the mouth of the Gambia River to what is now Burkina Faso and, particularly through Dyula traders, from the Niger loop to the trading centers on the south coast. All across this region, political institutions with Malian structures and terminology survived to the colonial period and beyond.

=== Architecture ===
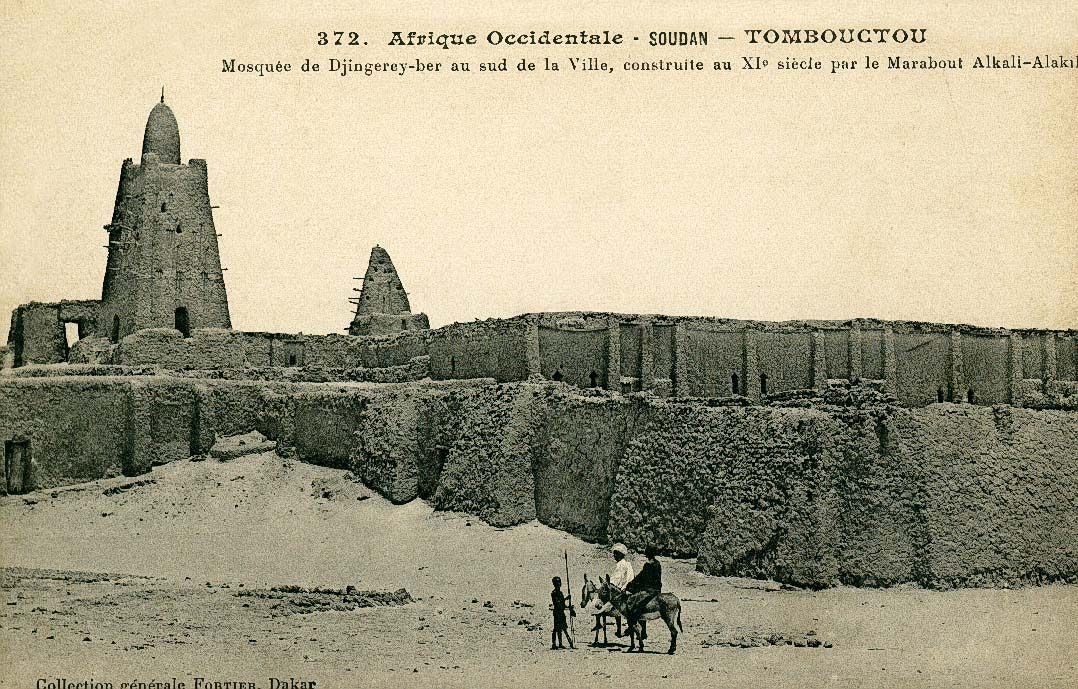
Remains of the Djinguereber Mosque in Timbuktu. The original mosque was built in the 14th century and reconstructed over the following centuries.

Imperial Malian architecture was characterised by Sudano-Sahelian architecture. This style is distinguished by the use of mudbricks and an adobe plaster, with large wooden-log support beams that jut out from the wall face for large buildings such as mosques or palaces.

The dating of the original Great Mosque of Djenné, the most prominent example of this style today, is uncertain but thought to date as early as 1200 to as late as 1330. The current structure, built under French colonial rule by the traditional Djenne masons, dates from 1907 and recreates some of the original's design and on the original plan. The earliest document mentioning the old Djenne mosque is Abd al-Sadi's Tarikh al-Sudan, which gives the early history, presumably from the oral tradition as it existed in the mid seventeenth century. The tarikh states that a Sultan Kunburu became a Muslim and had his palace pulled down and the site turned into a mosque; he then built another palace for himself near the mosque on the east side.

The Sudano-Sahelian influence was particularly widely incorporated during the rule of Mansa Musa I, who constructed many architectural projects, including the Great Mosque of Gao and Royal Palace in Timbuktu, which was built with the assistance of Ishaak al-Tuedjin, an architect brought by Musa from his pilgrimage to Mecca.

== See also ==
- Kouyate family
- Bamana Empire
- List of Sunni dynasties
- List of kingdoms and empires in African history
