= Nehemia Levtzion =

Israeli historian (1935–2003)

- נחמיה לבציון
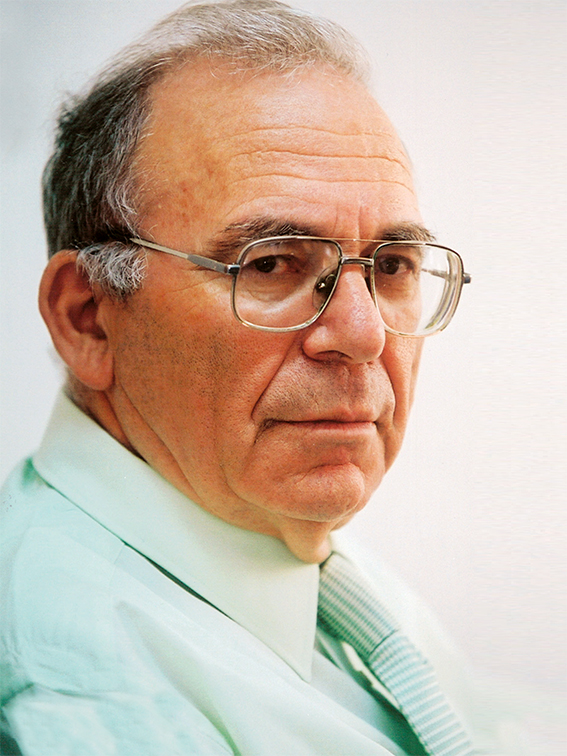
- Nehemia Levtzion
- Born: November 24, 1935; Be'er Tuvia, Mandatory Palestine
- Died: August 15, 2003 (aged 67)
- Title: President of the Open University of Israel (1987-1992); Executive Director of the Van Leer Jerusalem Institute (1994-1997)
- Children: 4

Academic work
- Institutions: Hebrew University of Jerusalem
- Doctoral students: Amalia Levanoni

Nehemia Levtzion (Hebrew: נחמיה לבציון; November 24, 1935 — August 15, 2003) was an Israeli scholar of African history, Near East, Islamic, and African studies, and the President of the Open University of Israel from 1987 to 1992. He was also the Executive Director of the Van Leer Jerusalem Institute from 1994 to 1997.

== Early and personal life ==
Levtzion was born in the moshav of Be'er Tuvia. His parents were Pnina (née Perlow) and Aron Lubetski, who later changed their surname to Levtzion, and he had an older sister named Hanna. He was Jewish, and had four children. His wife Tirtza was a teacher and deputy head of Jerusalem's Gymnasia Rehavia high school in Jerusalem. They lived for a time in Ghana, where he studied the spread of Islam in Africa; the family also lived in Beit Hakerem in Jerusalem. Levtzion completed a dissertation at the University of London in 1965.

== Career ==
Levtzion was a scholar of African history, Near East, Islamic, and African studies, and especially Islam in Africa. He taught at (starting in 1965) and was Professor of History and Asian and African Studies and the Dean of the Faculty of Humanities (1978-1981) at the Hebrew University of Jerusalem, the Director of the Ben-Zvi Institute for the Study of Jewish Communities in the East (1982-1987), the President of the Open University of Israel (1987-1992), the Executive Director of the Van Leer Jerusalem Institute (1994-1997), and the Chairman of the Council for Higher Education in Israel’s Planning and Budgeting Committee (1997-2003).

The Nehemia Levtzion Center for Islamic Studies was established at the Hebrew University of Jerusalem in 2004.

== Selected publications ==
- Levtzion, Nehemia (1969). Muslims and Chiefs in West Africa: A Study of Islam in the Middle Volta Basin in the Pre-Colonial Period. Oxford University Press. p. 228.
- Levtzion, Nehemia (1973). Ancient Ghana and Mali. Methuen and Company. p. 283.
- Levtzion, Nehemia, ed. (1979). Conversion to Islam. Holmes and Meier. p. 272.
- Levtzion, Nehemia; Fisher, Humphrey J., eds. (1987). Rural and Urban Islam in West Africa. Lynne Rienner Publishers. p. 176.
- Levtzion, Nehemia; Voll, James O., eds. (1987). Eighteenth-Century Renewal and Reform in Islam. Syracuse University Press. p. 200.
- Levtzion, Nehemia (1994). Islam in West Africa: Religion, Society and Politics to 1800. Ashgate Publishing. p. 324.
- Levtzion, Nehemia; Pouwels, Randall L. (2000). The History of Islam in Africa. Ohio University Press. p. 592.
- Levtzion, Nehemia (2007). Abitbol, Michel; Nadan, Amos (eds.). Islam in Africa and the Middle East: Studies on Conversion and Renewal. Ashgate/Variorum. p. 336.
