= Mansa (title) =

Royal title in the Mali Empire

Coordinates: 23°25′48″N 72°40′12″E

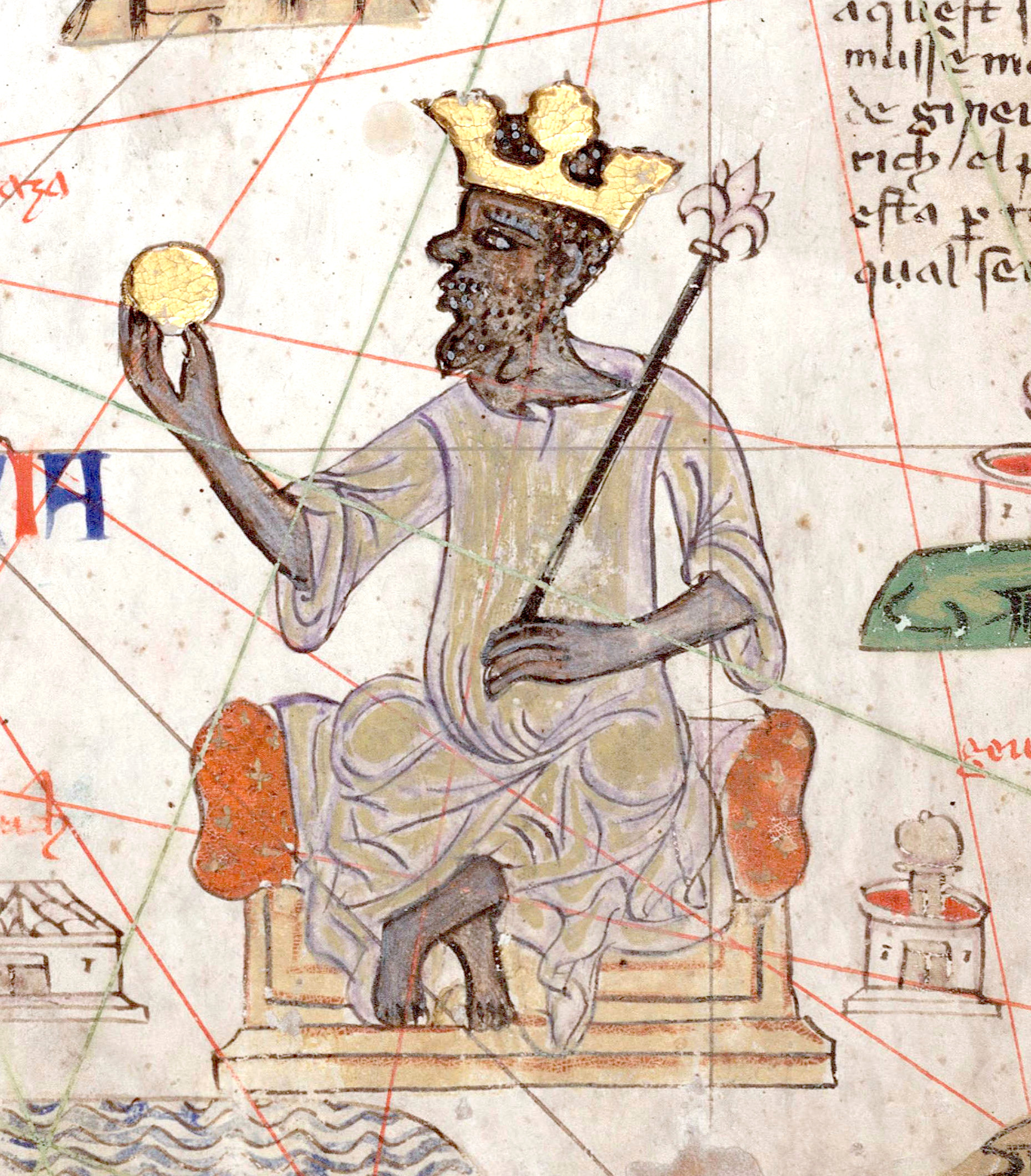
Depiction of Mansa Musa, ruler of the Mali Empire in the 14th century, from a 1375 Catalan Atlas of the known world (mappa mundi), created by Abraham Cresques

Mansa (N'Ko: ߡߊ߲߬ߛߊ; pl. mansaw) is a Maninka and Mandinka word for a hereditary ruler, commonly translated as "king". It is particularly known as the title of the rulers of the Mali Empire, such as Mansa Musa, and in this context is sometimes translated as "emperor". It is also a title held by traditional village rulers, and in this context is translated as "chief".

Mansa contrasts with another Manding word for ruler, faama. Faama emphasizes the military, coercive authority of a ruler, and can be translated as "tyrant", whereas mansa refers to a hereditary ruler whose authority is derived from tradition and mystical power. A ruler can be both a faama and a mansa, but a mansa was not necessarily a faama.

The word mansa (Arabic: منسا, romanized: mansā) was recorded in Arabic during the 14th century by North African writers such as Ibn Battuta and Ibn Khaldun, who explained it as meaning "sultan". Cognates of mansa exist in other Mandé languages, such as Soninke manga, Susu menge, and Bambara masa. Vydrin also compared it to mensey, the Guanche word for their rulers. According to Misiugin and Vydrin, the original meaning of the root word was probably "chief of hunters" or "chief of warriors".

An alternate translation of mansa, which Jansen attributes to the followers of Marcel Griaule, is that mansa means "god", "the divine principle", or "priest-king". Jansen notes that they have not provided their reasoning for choosing this translation.
