= Nonkon =

Coordinates: 13°13′N 7°51′W

- Commune and town
- Interactive map of Nonkon
- Country: Mali
- Region: Koulikoro Region
- Cercle: Kolokani Cercle

Population (2010)
  - Total: 9,987
  - Nonkon village: 3,412
- Time zone: UTC+0 (GMT)

Nonkon is a small town and commune in the Cercle of Kolokani in the Koulikoro Region of south-western Mali. As of 2010 the commune (made of 20 villages) had a population of 9987.

== History ==
The people of Nonkon trace their ancestry to N’Tontji Diarra, originally from Koblé, near Gouni on the right bank of the Niger River, opposite Koulikoro. In a fit of anger, N’Tontji killed the dog of his master and had to flee. He crossed the river with a friend and they were welcomed in Bélédougou by the village chief of Korian. They first established N’Tontjibougou and later settled in a secluded valley founding the village of Nonkon.

In 1875, Nonkon successfully resisted an attack by the Toucouleur warriors of the Ahmadou Tall, son of El Hadj Umar Tall.
