= Kenié Hydroelectric Power Station =

Power station in Mali

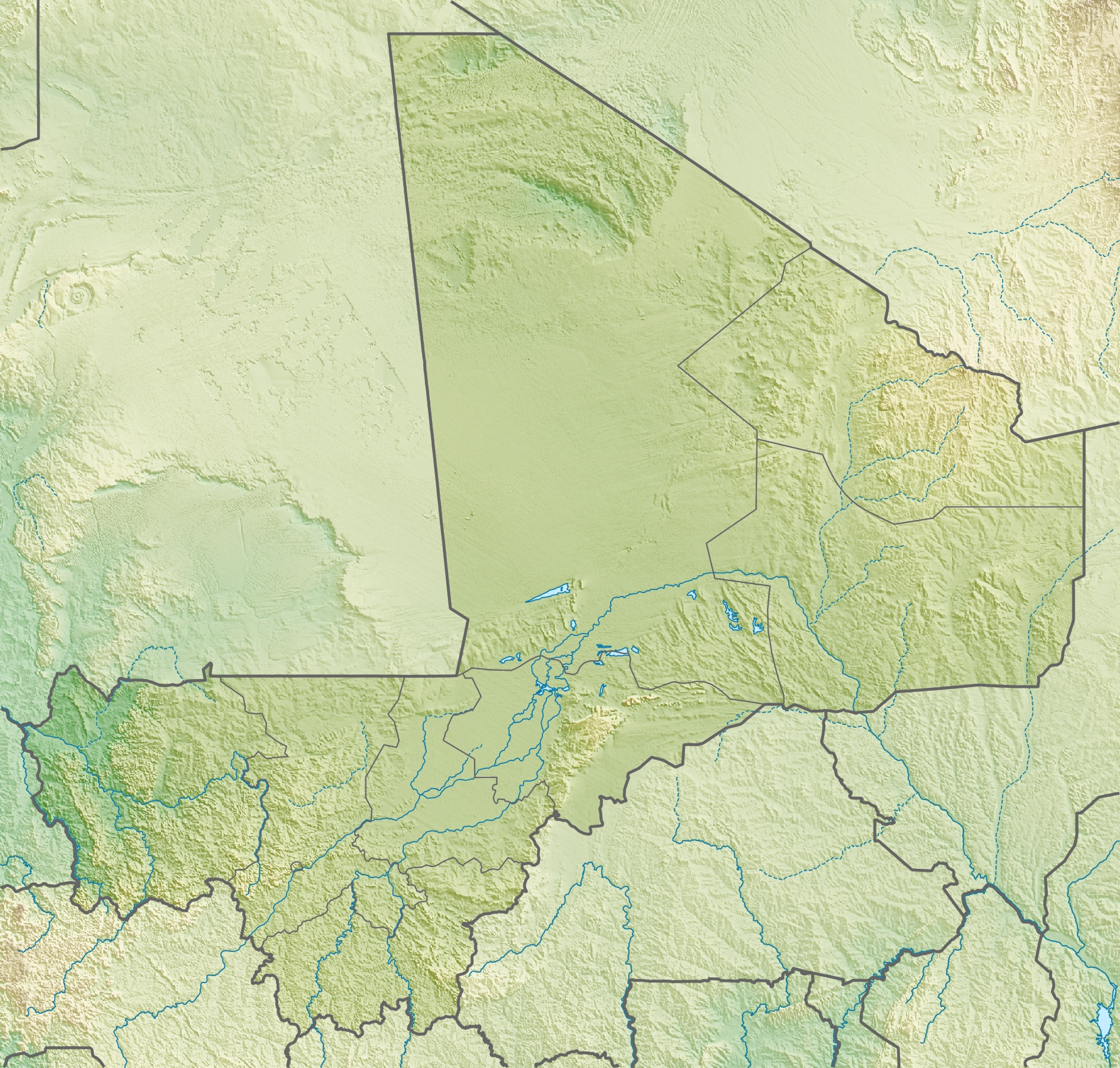
- Map of Mali showing the location of Kenié HPP. Kenié Hydroelectric Power Station (Africa) Kenié Hydroelectric Power Station (Earth)
- Country: Mali
- Location: Baguinéda, Kati Cercle, Koulikoro Region
- Coordinates: 12°38′31″N 07°47′09″W
- Purpose: Power
- Status: Proposed
- Construction cost: €110 million
- Owner: Eranove
- Operator: Kenié Énergie Renouvelable

Dam and spillways
- Impounds: Niger River

Power Station
- Installed capacity: 42 megawatts (56,000 hp)
- Annual generation: 175 GWh

Kenié Hydroelectric Power Station is a 42 megawatts (56,000 hp) hydroelectric power station under development in Mali. The power station is owned by Eranove, a French company that specializes in the supply, distribution and management of electricity and water in Africa. In June 2015, working through its subsidiary, Kenié Énergie Renouvelable (Kénié Renewable Energy), Eranove signed a 30-year concession with the Malian government, to design, finance, build, operate and maintain this power station. Kénié Renewable Energy (KRE) is co-owned by the International Finance Corporation (IFC), a component of the World Bank Group. The energy off-taker for this power station is expected to be Société Energie du Mali (EDM-SA), the Malian public utility parastatal company.

== Location ==
The power station would be located at Baguinéda, along the Niger River, in Kati Cercle, in the Koulikoro Region of southwestern Mali. This is approximately 35 kilometres (22 mi), east of Bamako, the capital and largest city of Mali.

== Overview ==
The design calls for generation capacity of 42 megawatts, equivalent to 175 GWh in annual production, capable of supplying 175,000 Malian homes. The 30-year concession for this power station was awarded to Eranove on a build–own–operate–transfer (BOOT) arrangement. The Malian Council of Ministers approved the award in a cabinet meeting on 15 November 2018.

== Ownership ==
Kenié Energies Revouvelables is the name of the special purpose vehicle company (SPV) that was awarded the concession contract, on behalf of Eranove, its parent company. The table below illustrates the ownership and shareholding in the SPV.

Shareholding In Kenié Energies Revouvelables In 2018
Rank	Shareholder	Domicile	Percentage	Notes
1	Eranove	France	80.0	
2	International Finance Corporation	United States	20.0	
	Total		100.0	

== Construction costs ==
The construction costs were reported as €110 (US$124 million), in 2015 money.

== Other considerations ==
In 2015 the expectation was to reach financial close in 2016, start construction after that and commission the power station in 2020, after four years of construction. Although those plans did not materialize, as of April 2022, Eranove still hopes to develop this renewable energy infrastructure project in the future.

== See also ==
- List of power stations in Mali
- Kandadji Dam
