= List of World Heritage Sites in Mali =

Location of World Heritage Sites in Mali

The United Nations Educational, Scientific and Cultural Organization (UNESCO) World Heritage Sites are places of importance to cultural or natural heritage as described in the UNESCO World Heritage Convention, established in 1972. Cultural heritage consists of monuments (such as architectural works, monumental sculptures, or inscriptions), groups of buildings, and sites (including archaeological sites). Natural features (consisting of physical and biological formations), geological and physiographical formations (including habitats of threatened species of animals and plants), and natural sites which are important from the point of view of science, conservation or natural beauty, are defined as natural heritage. Mali accepted the convention on April 5, 1977, making its historical sites eligible for inclusion on the list. As of 2023, Mali has four World Heritage Sites, however, because of the instability in the country, three of them are listed in the List of World Heritage Sites in Danger. Mali has served on the World Heritage Committee twice.

== World Heritage Sites ==
UNESCO lists sites under ten criteria; each entry must meet at least one of the criteria. Criteria i through vi are cultural, and vii through x are natural.

† In danger

World Heritage Sites
Site	Image	Location (region)	Year listed	UNESCO data	Description
Old Towns of Djenné	A picture of the Great Mosque of Djenné	Mopti Region	1988	116rev; iii, iv (cultural)	Inhabited since 250 B.C., Djenné became a market centre and an important link in the trans-Saharan gold trade. In the 15th and 16th centuries, it was one of the centres for the propagation of Islam. Its traditional houses, of which nearly 2,000 have survived, are built on hillocks (toguere) as protection from the seasonal floods.
Timbuktu		Tomboctou Region	1988	119rev; ii, iv, v (cultural)	Home of the prestigious Koranic Sankore University and other madrasas, Timbuktu was an intellectual and spiritual capital and a centre for the propagation of Islam throughout Africa in the 15th and 16th centuries. Its three great mosques, Djingareyber, Sankore and Sidi Yahia, recall Timbuktu's golden age. Although continuously restored, these monuments are today under threat from desertification.
Cliff of Bandiagara (Land of the Dogons)		Mopti Region	1989	516; v, vii (mixed)	The Bandiagara site is an outstanding landscape of cliffs and sandy plateaux with some beautiful architecture (houses, granaries, altars, sanctuaries and Togu Na, or communal meeting-places). Several age-old social traditions live on in the region (masks, feasts, rituals, and ceremonies involving ancestor worship). The geological, archaeological and ethnological interest, together with the landscape, make the Bandiagara plateau one of West Africa's most impressive sites.
Tomb of Askia		Gao Region	2004	1139; ii, iii, iv (cultural)	The dramatic 17-m pyramidal structure of the Tomb of Askia was built by Askia Mohamed, the Emperor of Songhai, in 1495 in his capital Gao. It bears testimony to the power and riches of the empire that flourished in the 15th and 16th centuries through its control of the trans-Saharan trade, notably in salt and gold. It is also a fine example of the monumental mud-building traditions of the West African Sahel. The complex, including the pyramidal tomb, two flat-roofed mosque buildings, the mosque cemetery and the open-air assembly ground, was built when Gao became the capital of the Songhai Empire and after Askia Mohamed had returned from Mecca and made Islam the official religion of the empire.

== Tentative List ==
In addition to sites inscribed on the World Heritage List, member states can maintain a list of tentative sites that they may consider for nomination. Nominations for the World Heritage List are only accepted if the site was previously listed on the tentative list. As of 2023, Mali has listed fifteen properties on its tentative list.

Tentative sites
Site	Image	Location (region)	Year listed	UNESCO criteria	Description
Boucle du Baoulé		Kayes Region, Koulikoro Region	1999	ii, iv (cultural)	
Es-Souk		Kidal Region	1999	ii, iv (cultural)	
Hamdullahi Historic City		Mopti Region	2009	i, vi (cultural)	
Médine Fort		Kayes Region	2009	iii, iv (cultural)	
Great Friday Mosque of Niono		Ségou Region	2009	iii, iv (cultural)	
Komoguel Mosque		Mopti Region	2009	iii, iv (cultural)	
Tata of Sikasso		Sikasso Region	2009	i, ii, vi (cultural)	
Biosphere Reserve of Bafing Makana Park		Kayes Region	2016	viii, x (natural)	
Lac Magui Nature Reserve		Kayes Region	2016	viii, x (natural)	
Gourma Elephant Biodiversity Reserve		Tomboctou Region	2017	viii, x (natural)	
Niger River Basin (from the Markala threshold to Lake Débo)		Mopti Region, Ségou Region, Tomboctou Region	2017	viii, x (natural)	
Bamako Cathedral		Bamako Region	2017	ii, iv (cultural)	
Mandiakuy Church		Ségou Region	2017	ii, iv (cultural)	
Historical Sites and Cultural Landscapes of Manden		Koulikoro Region	2018	ii, iv, x (mixed)	
Mosque of Kankou Moussa in Gao		Gao Region	2021	ii, iv (cultural)	

== See also ==
- List of Intangible Cultural Heritage elements in Mali
