= Fatoumata Keïta =

Malian writer (born 1977)

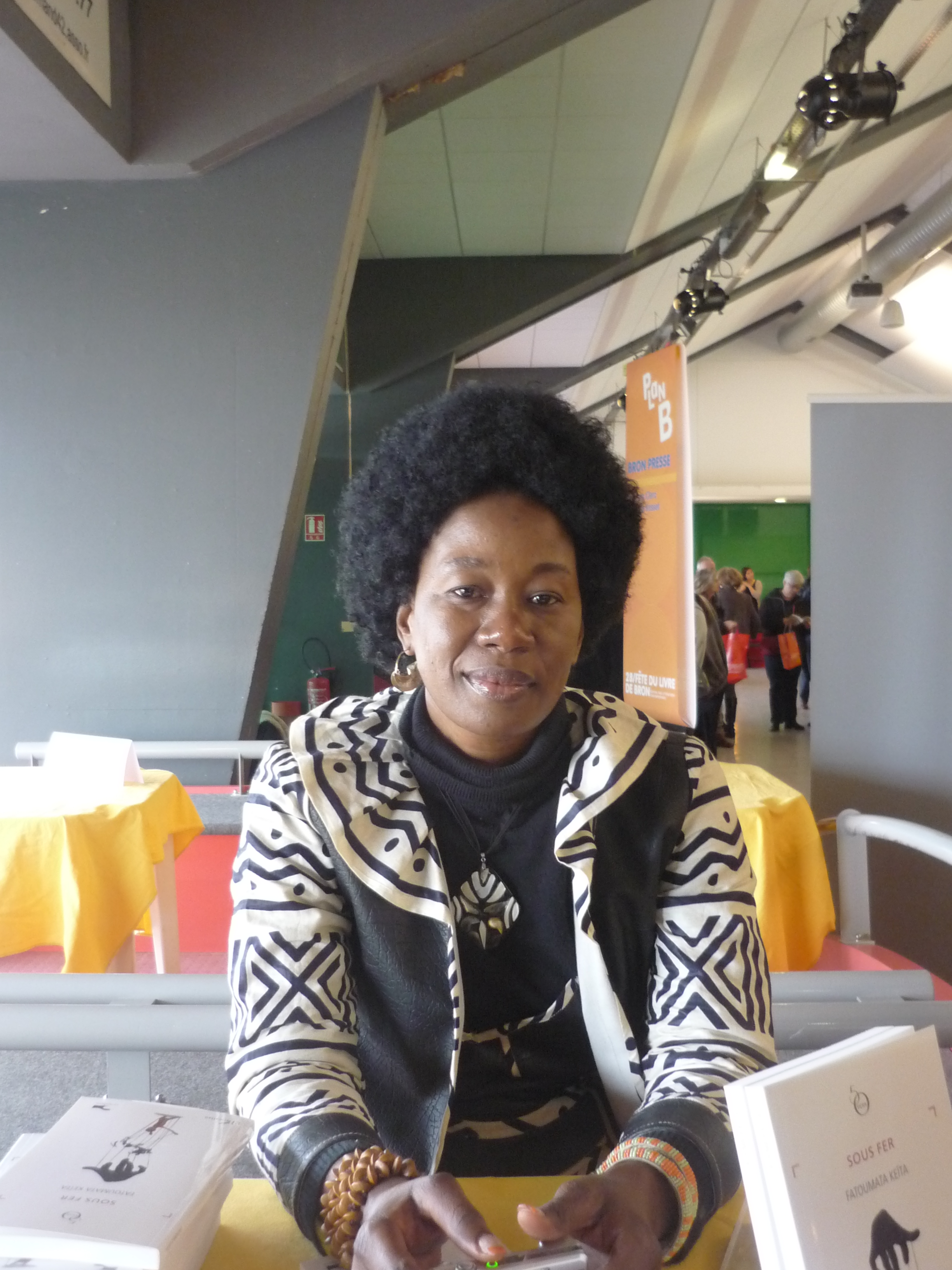
- Born: 1977 (age 48–49); Baguinéda
- Education: University of Bamako, Mandé Bukari University
- Occupations: Novelist, poet, essayist
- Writing career
- Language: French
- Notable awards: Massa Makan Diabaté Prize (2015)

Fatoumata Keïta (born 1977), also known as Fatim Keïta, is a Malian writer of novels, poetry, and essays. Her work deals with contemporary Malian society, both urban and rural.

== Early life and education ==
Keïta was born in 1977 in Baguinéda, near Bamako, Mali. She was one of five children. At the age of 12, she was forced to leave her parents' home to live in Figuira, her father's native village, in Mandé, and then she was sent to live with a host family in Kayes. She worked selling fresh water at the station every night.

She was later able to continue her studies, obtaining a master's degree in social anthropology from the University of Bamako and a master of advanced studies degree in socioeconomics of development from Mandé Bukari University in Bamako.

== Career ==
Keïta's first job after graduating with her master of advanced studies was editing radio scripts for USAID/PHARE.

She also began writing, producing poetry, novels, and essays. Her first work was Polygamie, gangrène du peuple ("Polygamy, Gangrene of the People"), published in 1998 by Nouvelles Éditions Africaines in an anthology that collected works by young West African writers. She went on to produce a collection of short stories, Les Ombres du passé ("The Shadows of the Past"), as well as a poetry collection, À toutes les muses ("To All the Muses"), and some of her poems were set to music by Aba Diop. In 2014, Keïta's essay Crise sécuritaire et violences au Nord du Mali ("Security Crisis and Violence in Northern Mali") was published by Éditions La Sahélienne.

She is also the author of a trilogy of romance novels, starting in 2013 with Sous fer, which won the Massa Makan Diabaté Prize in 2015, followed by the sequels Quand les cauris se taisent and Les Mamelles de l’amour.

In 2016, Keïta released a travel book, J’aimais cet homme qui chantait le fleuve, which combines her poetry with photos of the Niger River taken by Michel Calzat. Her multivolume poetry collection Ce n’est jamais fini was nominated for the 2022 Pan African Writers' Association Poetry Prize.

Her work deals with contemporary Malian society, both in rural Mandé areas and in urban Bamako, including female genital mutilation, polygamy, levirate marriage, etc. Though she writes in French, her writing often incorporates Malinké expressions.
