= Torodo, Mali =

Torodo
- Village
- Location in Mali
- Coordinates: 13°3′25″N 8°12′25″W
- Country: Mali
- Region: Koulikoro Region
- Cercle: Kati Cercle
- Commune: Diédougou
- Time zone: UTC+0 (GMT)

Torodo is a village and seat of the commune of Diédougou in the Cercle of Kati in the Koulikoro Region of south-western Mali. The village is 60 km northwest of Bamako, the Malian capital.
