= Bossofala =

- Commune
- Location in Mali
- Coordinates: 12°51′51″N 8°27′6″W
- Country: Mali
- Region: Koulikoro Region
- Cercle: Koulikoro Cercle

Area
  - Total: 800 km^{2} (310 sq mi)

Population (2009 census)
  - Total: 17,455
  - Density: 22/km^{2} (57/sq mi)
- Time zone: UTC+0 (GMT)

Bossofala is a rural commune in the Cercle of Kati in the Koulikoro Region of south-western Mali. The commune contains the main town, Neguela, and 16 villages. At the time of the 2009 census the commune had a population of 17,455. The commune lies to the northwest of Bamako, the Malian capital, and is bounded to the west by the River Baoulé, a tributary of Bakoy.
