= Kenekou =

- Town
- Country: Mali
- Region: Koulikoro Region
- Cercle: Kangaba Cercle
- Commune: Dinandougou
- Time zone: UTC+0 (GMT)

Kenekou is a small town and seat of the commune of Dinandougou in the Cercle of Kangaba in the Koulikoro Region of south-western Mali.
