= Faladié =

- Village
- Location in Mali
- Coordinates: 13°8′20″N 8°20′16″W
- Country: Mali
- Region: Koulikoro Region
- Cercle: Kati Cercle
- Commune: N'Tjiba
- Elevation: 337 m (1,106 ft)
- Time zone: UTC+0 (GMT)

Faladié is a village and seat of the commune of N'Tjiba in the Cercle of Kati in the Koulikoro Region of south-western Mali. The village lies 77 km northwest of the Malian capital, Bamako.
