= Keliegoue =

- Town
- Country: Mali
- Region: Koulikoro Region
- Cercle: Dioila Cercle
- Commune: Nouga
- Time zone: UTC+0 (GMT)

Keliegoue is a small town and seat of the commune of Nouga in the Cercle of Kangaba in the Koulikoro Region of south-western Mali.
