= Kéniéba, Koulikoro =

Kéniéba
- Town
- Location in Mali
- Coordinates: 12°2′40″N 8°37′41″W
- Country: Mali
- Region: Koulikoro Region
- Cercle: Kangaba Cercle
- Commune: Benkadi Habaladougou
- Time zone: UTC+0 (GMT)

Kéniéba is a small town and seat of the commune of Benkadi Habaladougou in the Cercle of Kangaba in the Koulikoro Region of south-western Mali.
