= Sobra, Mali =

Sobra
- Commune
- Location within Mali
- Coordinates: 12°26′7″N 8°44′25″W
- Country: Mali
- Region: Koulikoro
- Cercle: Kati Cercle

Area
  - Total: 938 km^{2} (362 sq mi)

Population (2009 census)
  - Total: 9,900
  - Density: 11/km^{2} (27/sq mi)
- Time zone: UTC+0 (GMT)

Sobra is a rural commune in the Kati Cercle of the Koulikoro Region of Mali. The commune covers an area of approximately 938 square kilometers and contains 10 villages. In the 2009 census it had a population of 9,900. The administrative centre (chef-lieu) is the village of Sandama.
