= Figuira-Toma =

- Town
- Location in Mali
- Coordinates: 11°55′N 8°22′W
- Country: Mali
- Region: Koulikoro Region
- Cercle: Kangaba Cercle
- Commune: Maramadougou
- Time zone: UTC+0 (GMT)

Figuira-Toma is a small town and seat of the commune of Maramandougou in the Cercle of Kangaba in the Koulikoro Region of south-western Mali.
