= Sandama, Mali =

Sandama
- Village
- Location within Mali
- Coordinates: 12°26′7″N 8°44′25″W
- Country: Mali
- Region: Koulikoro
- Cercle: Kati Cercle
- Commune: Sobra
- Time zone: UTC+0 (GMT)

Sandama is a village and seat (chef-lieu) of the rural commune of Sobra in the Kati Cercle of the Koulikoro Region of Mali.
