= Ouezzindougou =

- Town
- Location in Mali
- Coordinates: 12°32′44″N 8°5′8″W
- Country: Mali
- Region: Koulikoro Region
- Cercle: Kati Cercle
- Commune: Mandé
- Time zone: UTC+0 (GMT)

Ouezzindougou is a small town and seat of the commune of Mandé in the Cercle of Kati in the Koulikoro Region of south-western Mali. The town lies 17 km southwest of Bamako, the Malian capital, and to the north of the Niger River.
