= Tiélé, Mali =

Tiélé
- Commune and village
- Location in Mali
- Coordinates: 12°18′10″N 7°34′05″W
- Country: Mali
- Region: Koulikoro Region
- Cercle: Kati Cercle

Area
  - Total: 586 km^{2} (226 sq mi)

Population (2009 census)
  - Total: 18,696
  - Density: 31.9/km^{2} (82.6/sq mi)
- Time zone: UTC+0 (GMT)

Tiélé is a village and rural commune in the Cercle of Kati in the Koulikoro Region of south-western Mali. The commune has an area of approximately 586 square kilometers and includes 13 villages. In the 2009 census it had a population of 18,696. The village of Tiélé is 70 km southeast of Bamako, the Malian capital.
