= Dombila =

- Commune and village
- Location in Mali
- Coordinates: 12°45′48″N 8°16′29″W
- Country: Mali
- Region: Koulikoro Region
- Cercle: Kati Cercle

Population (2009 census)
  - Total: 3,506
- Time zone: UTC+0 (GMT)

Dombila is a village and rural commune in the Cercle of Kati in the Koulikoro Region of south-western Mali. The commune contains 11 villages and in the 2009 census had a population of 3,506.
