= Kaniogo =

Coordinates: 11°59′21″N 8°36′35″W

- Commune and town
- Interactive map of Kaniogo
- Country: Mali
- Region: Koulikoro Region
- Cercle: Kangaba Cercle

Population (1998)
  - Total: 11,415
- Time zone: UTC+0 (GMT)

Kaniogo is a small town and commune in the Cercle of Kangaba in the Koulikoro Region of south-western Mali. As of 1998 the commune had a population of 11415.

Mamadore Traore being the first democratically elected mayor of Kaniogo in all of Mali.
