= Kolokani Cercle =

Coordinates: 13°45′N 8°10′W

Kolokani
- Cercle
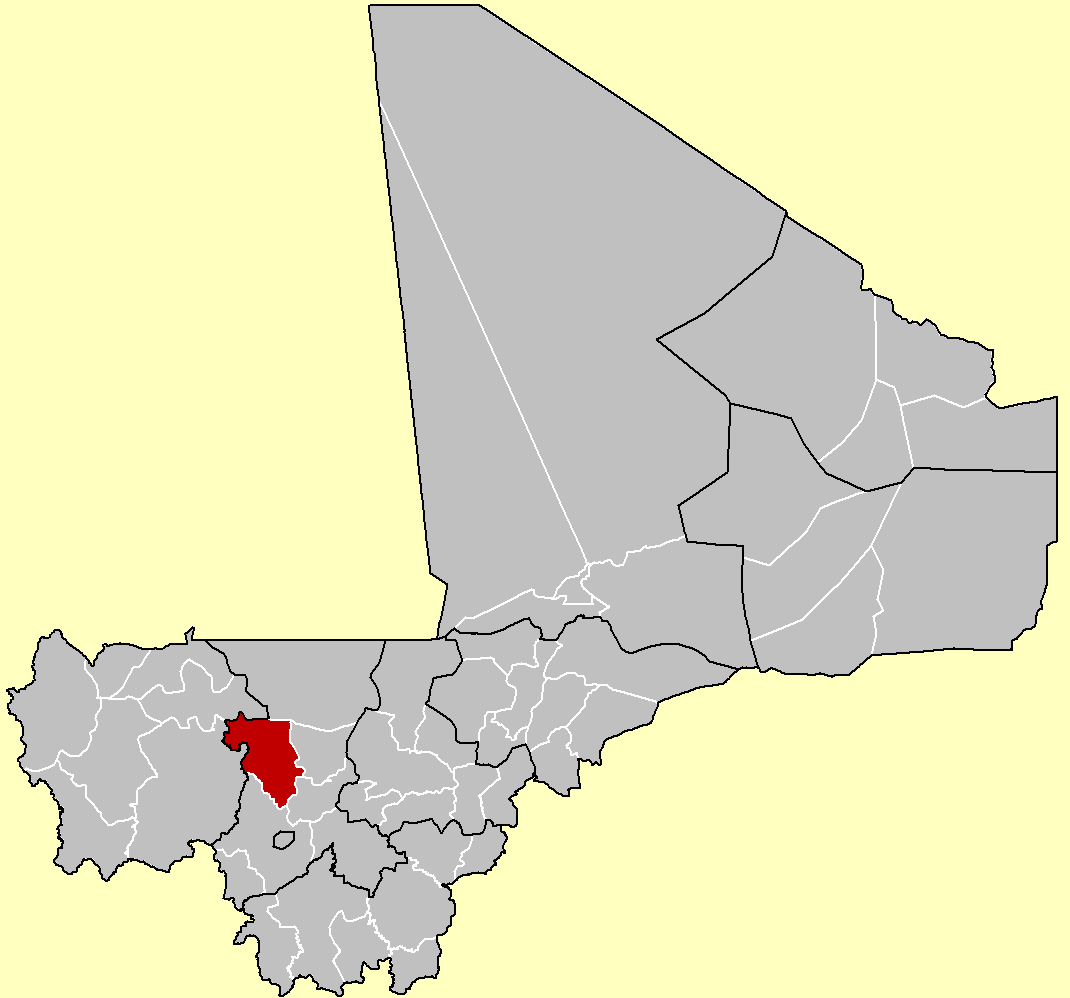
- Location of Kolokani Cercle in Mali
- Country: Mali
- Region: Koulikoro Region
- Admin HQ (Chef-lieu): Kolokani

Area
  - Total: 12,000 km^{2} (4,600 sq mi)

Population (2009 census)
  - Total: 233,919
  - Density: 19/km^{2} (50/sq mi)
- Time zone: UTC+0 (GMT)

Kolokani Cercle is an administrative subdivision of the Koulikoro Region of Mali. Its seat is the town of Kolokani, which is also its largest settlement. It lies directly to the north of Kati Cercle. Also to the south, (surrounded by the Kati Cercle) is the District of Bamako, which after independence was carved out of the middle of the Region. The cercle is further divided into communes.

The Kolokani Cercle is divided into ten communes:

- Didieni
- Guihoyo
- Kolokani
- Massantola
- Nonkon
- Nossombougou
- Ouolodo
- Sagabala
- Sebekoro
- Tioribougou

Kolokani Cercle in the west center of Koulikoro Region, and covers some 12,000 km². It is home to primarily Bambara farmers. Kolokani forms the center of the precolonial Beledougou region, an area which remained staunchly animist after the fall of the Bambara Empire. In 1915, much of the population revolted against French forced conscription in a rising led by Koumi Diosse Traore. The north of the Cercle is dry, Sahel land, primarily used for livestock, and runs along the interface of the wetter Sudan to the south.
