= N'Gabacoro =

- Commune and town
- Location in Mali
- Coordinates: 12°41′36″N 7°50′52″W
- Country: Mali
- Region: Koulikoro Region
- Cercle: Kati Cercle

Area
  - Total: 103 km^{2} (40 sq mi)

Population (2009 census)
  - Total: 15,153
  - Density: 147/km^{2} (381/sq mi)
- Time zone: UTC+0 (GMT)

N'Gabacoro or N'Gabacoro-Droit is a small town and rural commune in the Cercle of Kati in the Koulikoro Region of south-western Mali. The commune covers an area of 103 square kilometers and includes the town and 6 villages. In the 2009 census the commune had a population of 15,153. The town of N'Gabacoro lies 18 km east of the Malian capital, Bamako.
