= Diédougou =

Diedougou may refer to:

- Diédougou, Dioïla, a commune of the Béléko Cercle in the Dioïla Region of Mali
- Diédougou, Kati, a commune of the Néguéla Cercle in the Koulikoro Region of Mali
- Diédougou, Sikasso, a commune of the Konséguéla Cercle in the Koutiala Region of Mali
- Diédougou, Ségou, a commune of the Dioro Cercle in the Ségou Region of Mali
