= Karan, Mali =

Karan
- Commune and town
- Location in Mali
- Coordinates: 12°7′58″N 8°31′35″W
- Country: Mali
- Region: Koulikoro Region
- Cercle: Kangaba Cercle

Population (2009 census)
  - Total: 6,874
- Time zone: UTC+0 (GMT)

Karan is a town and urban commune in the Koulikoro Region of southwestern Mali. The 2009 census recorded the commune as having a population of 6,874.
