= Moribabougou =

- Commune and town
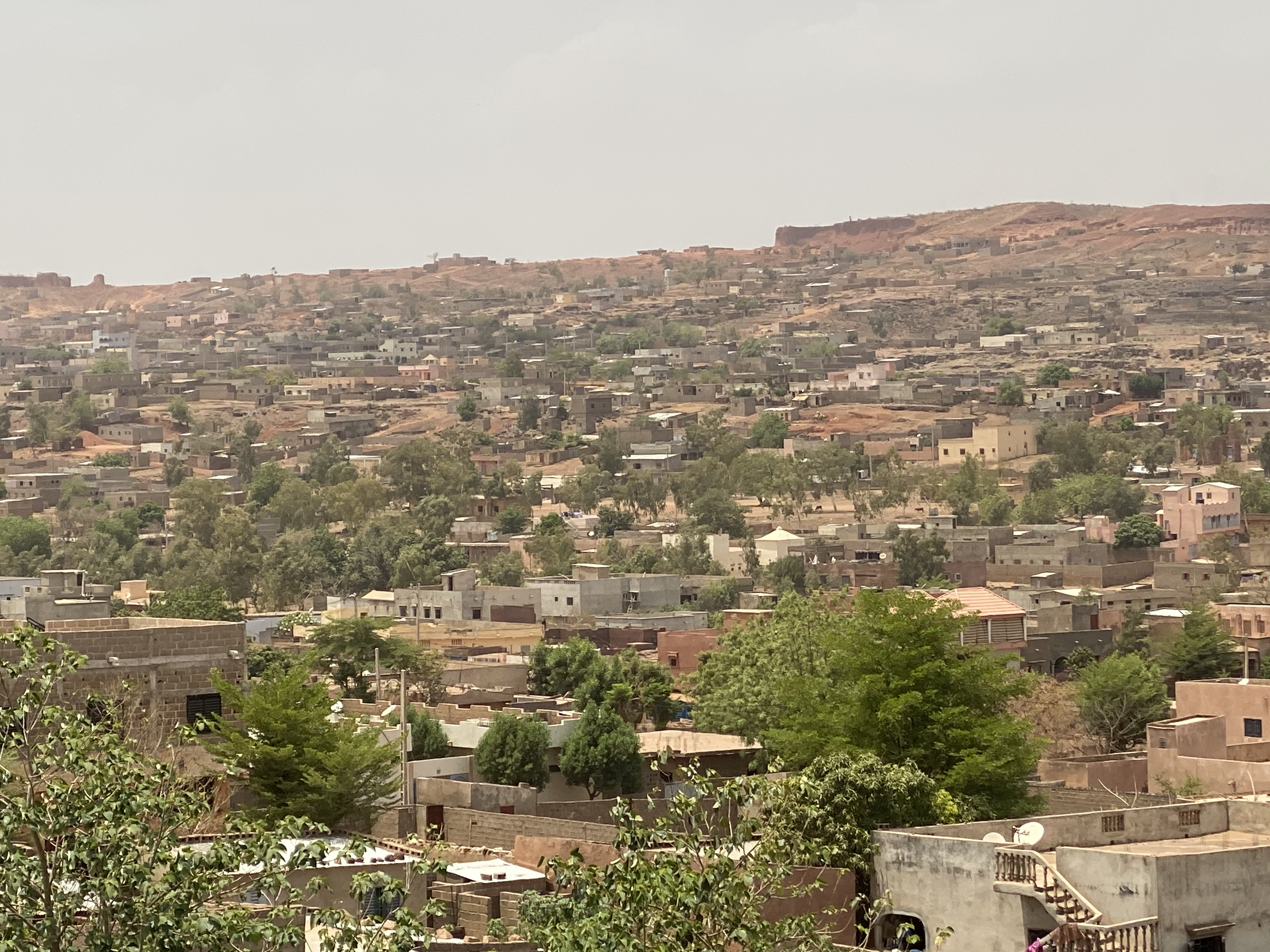
- The town of Moribabougou.

- Location in Mali
- Coordinates: 12°41′30″N 7°51′52″W
- Country: Mali
- Region: Koulikoro Region
- Cercle: Kati Cercle

Area
  - Total: 79 km^{2} (31 sq mi)

Population (2009 census)
  - Total: 28,574
  - Density: 360/km^{2} (940/sq mi)
- Time zone: UTC+0 (GMT)

Moribabougou is a small town and rural commune in the Cercle of Kati in the Koulikoro Region of south-western Mali. It lies on the eastern outskirts of the greater Bamako area. In the 2009 census the commune had a population of 28,574.

== History ==
The name of the town in Bambara refers to the home or hamlet (bugu) of a marabout (moriba).

Moribabougou hosted two pre-service trainings for Peace Corps/Mali volunteers, one in 1981 and the second in 1983. Don Lawder's 1997 Fishing in the Sky: The Education of Namory Keita was in part an account of his experience in the latter.
