= Toupta Boguena =

Chadian scientist and administrator (died 2021)

- Died: 4 August 2021
- Education: University of Arizona, Brigham Young University
- Occupations: Scientist and administrator
- Known for: Minister of Public Health

Toupta Boguena (died 4 August 2021) was a Chadian scientist and administrator. She served as Chad's Minister of Public Health between 2010 and 2011. Since 2016, she had served as the executive secretary of the Niger Basin Authority.

== Early life and education ==
Boguena spent some time in a refugee camp in Congo for people fleeing a civil war in Chad. She was awarded a United Nations funded scholarship to attend the University of Arizona, where she completed a Bachelor of Science degree in agronomy in 1991 and Master of Science in agronomics and plant genetics in 1994. She then moved to Brigham Young University to do doctoral work in botany. Her work there focused on studying ways to control cheatgrass, invasive to Utah, using a locally found fungus. Cheatgrass is considered a problem for its potential to serve as kindling in wildfires.

== Political and administrative work in Chad ==
Boguena returned to Chad after completing her doctorate in 2003, founding a grassroots NGO, the Organization for Community Supported Sustainable Agriculture in Chad, focusing on improving agriculture in local villages.

Boguena was appointed Chad's Minister of Public Health in 2010 in the administration of President Idriss Deby. She was removed from this post in December 2011, and was replaced by Mammouth Nahor.

In 2016, Boguena was appointed the executive secretary of the Niger Basin Authority, an intergovernmental organization that aims to foster cooperation in managing and developing the resources of the basin of the River Niger. In this role, Boguena was working with member states and development organizations such as World Bank and African Development Bank to implement the programme for the Integrated Development and Adaptation to Climate Change - which is an initiative to protect the 130 million people living in the Niger basin from the effects of climate change and ecological degradation.

== Death ==
Boguena died on August 4, 2021, in Tunisia, where she was undergoing treatment for a disease.
