= Doubabougou =

- Commune and town
- Location in Mali
- Coordinates: 12°42′42″N 8°10′30″W
- Country: Mali
- Region: Koulikoro Region
- Cercle: Kati Cercle

Population (2009 census)
  - Total: 5,041
- Time zone: UTC+0 (GMT)

Doubabougou is a village and rural commune in the Cercle of Kati in the Koulikoro Region of south-western Mali. The commune contains 6 villages and had a population of 5,041 at the time of the 2009 census.
