= Gouni =

- Town
- Location in Mali
- Coordinates: 12°52′27″N 7°31′54″W
- Country: Mali
- Region: Koulikoro Region
- Cercle: Kangaba Cercle
- Commune: Meguetan
- Time zone: UTC+0 (GMT)

Gouni is a small town and seat of the commune of Meguetan in the Cercle of Kangaba in the Koulikoro Region of south-western Mali.
