= Nioumamakana =

- Commune and village
- Location in Mali
- Coordinates: 12°24′46″N 8°52′43″W
- Country: Mali
- Region: Koulikoro Region
- Cercle: Kati Cercle

Area
  - Total: 311 km^{2} (120 sq mi)

Population (2009 census)
  - Total: 7,442
  - Density: 23.9/km^{2} (62.0/sq mi)
- Time zone: UTC+0 (GMT)

Nioumamakana or Niouma Makana is a village and rural commune in the Cercle of Kati in the Koulikoro Region of south-western Mali. The commune covers an area of 311 square kilometers and includes 10 villages. In the 2009 census it had a population of 7,442. The administrative centre (chef-lieu) is the village of Nioumamakana.
