= Meguetan =

- Commune
- Location in Mali
- Coordinates: 12°52′27″N 7°31′54″W
- Country: Mali
- Region: Koulikoro Region
- Cercle: Koulikoro Cercle

Population (1998)
  - Total: 15,136
- Time zone: UTC+0 (GMT)

Meguetan is a commune in the Cercle of Koulikoro in the Koulikoro Region of south-western Mali. The principal town lies at Gouni on the Niger River. As of 1998 the commune had a population of 15,136.
