= Dialakorodji =

- Commune and town
- Location in Mali
- Coordinates: 12°42′30″N 7°58′8″W
- Country: Mali
- Region: Koulikoro Region
- Cercle: Kati Cercle

Population (2009 census)
  - Total: 45,740
- Time zone: UTC+0 (GMT)

Dialakorodji is a town and small commune in the Cercle of Kati in the Koulikoro Region of south-western Mali. Although classified as a rural commune, Dialakorodji is now a northern suburb of Bamako, the Malian capital. The population has been increasing very rapidly. In the 2008 census the population was 12,938 but this had increased to 47,740 by 2009, an annual growth of 12%.
