= N'Tjiba =

- Commune
- Location in Mali
- Coordinates: 13°8′20″N 8°20′16″W
- Country: Mali
- Region: Koulikoro Region
- Cercle: Kati Cercle

Area
  - Total: 802 km^{2} (310 sq mi)

Population (2009 census)
  - Total: 23,617
  - Density: 29.4/km^{2} (76.3/sq mi)
- Time zone: UTC+0 (GMT)

N'Tjiba is a rural commune in the Cercle of Kati in the Koulikoro Region of south-western Mali. The commune covers an area of approximately 802 square kilometers and includes 18 villages. The administrative centre is the village of Faladié. In the 2009 census the commune had a population of 23,617.
