= Diago =

- Commune and village
- Location in Mali
- Coordinates: 12°46′39″N 8°9′23″W
- Country: Mali
- Region: Koulikoro Region
- Cercle: Kati Cercle

Population (2009 census)
  - Total: 3,269
- Time zone: UTC+0 (GMT)

Diago is a village and rural commune in the Cercle of Kati in the Koulikoro Region of south-western Mali. The commune contains 7 villages and in the 2009 census had a population of 3,269. The village of Diago is 10 km northwest the town of Kati, the chef-lieu of the cercle.

Diago was founded by the Coulibaly family, descendants of Biton Coulibaly who fled Segou when Ngolo Diarra took power c. 1766. It was part of the Bamako kafo.
