= Maramandougou =

- Commune
- Location in Mali
- Coordinates: 11°55′N 8°22′W
- Country: Mali
- Region: Koulikoro Region
- Cercle: Kangaba Cercle

Population (2009 census)
  - Total: 14,485
- Time zone: UTC+0 (GMT)

Maramandougou is a rural commune in the Cercle of Kangaba in the Koulikoro Region of south-western Mali. The principal village lies at Figuira-Toma.
