= Koula =

Koula may refer to:

== Places ==
- Koula, Koulikoro, Mali
- Koula, Ségou, Mali

== Mountains ==
- Koula Mountains, Greece

== Rivers ==
- Kō'ula River, Kauai, Hawaii

== People ==
- Koula Agagiotou, a Greek actress
