= Dogodouman =

- Commune and town
- Location in Mali
- Coordinates: 12°37′20″N 8°4′6″W
- Country: Mali
- Region: Koulikoro Region
- Cercle: Kati Cercle

Population (2009 census)
  - Total: 8,851
- Time zone: UTC+0 (GMT)

Dogodouman is a small town and commune in the Cercle of Kati in the Koulikoro Region of south-western Mali. The small commune is classified as rural commune but lies close to the western suburbs of Bamako, the Malian capital, at the edge of the Monts Mandigues. In the 2009 census the commune had a population of 8,851.
