= Kandadji attack =

- Part of Islamist insurgency in Niger
Date	September 28, 2023
Location	Kandadji, Tillaberi Region, Niger
Result	Nigerien victory

Belligerents
Niger	Islamic State - Sahel Province (suspected)

Strength
Unknown	Several hundred

Casualties and losses
22+ killed 7 injured	100+ killed (per Niger)

On September 28, 2023, militants attacked a Nigerian army outpost in Kandadji, Tillabéri Region, Niger, killing 22 soldiers and leaving nearly 100 militants dead.

== Background ==
On July 26, 2023, disgruntled Nigerien officers led by Omar Tiani overthrew the democratically elected government of Mohamed Bazoum, decrying him for not effectively combatting the jihadist insurgencies in the country by Jama'at Nasr al-Islam wal-Muslimin, Islamic State in the Greater Sahara, and Boko Haram. Analysts stated that the coup would allow jihadists to expand even more throughout the tri-border region between Mali, Niger, and Burkina Faso. One of the stated reasons for the coup was the multiple deadly attacks in recent weeks, including the massacre of twelve civilians near Anzourou by jihadists on July 22.

Kandadji in Tillaberi is the location of the planned Kandadji Dam, the largest in Niger. Prior to the September 2023 attack, the dam and its workers had not been attacked. On the same week as the Kandadji attack, Islamic State – Sahel Province (ISSP) militants ambushed Nigerien soldiers near Imbalagan along the border with Mali, killing at least 33 soldiers.

== Attack ==
There are differing statements as to what occurred at Kandadji. The Counter Extremism Project said that Nigerien soldiers in the ongoing Operation Almalaou were escorting workers for the dam to Kandadji when they were attacked by unknown militants. Nigerien Defense Minister Salifou Modi said that several hundred jihadists attacked the town of Kandadji. An initial report from Modi said that seven soldiers were killed in the attack, and another five were killed in a "tragic traffic accident" while reinforcing the initial group of soldiers. An anonymous Nigerien official speaking to Reuters said ten soldiers were killed. The CEP said that the initial death toll of seven had increased to 22 soldiers killed by the end of the week. Seven other soldiers were injured.

The Nigerien government claimed to have repelled the attack and killed over 100 militants using ground troops and helicopters. One helicopter was hit, but returned to its base. In the days after the attack, Nigerien soldiers were reportedly conducting counter-offensives. No group claimed responsibility for the Kandadji attack, and the Nigerien government did not accuse any group of it. However, the Islamic State was suspected because it had conducted the Imbalagan attack that same week in the same area.
