= Niagadina =

- Commune and village
- Location in Mali
- Coordinates: 12°8′0″N 8°13′55″W
- Country: Mali
- Region: Koulikoro Region
- Cercle: Kati Cercle

Area
  - Total: 87 km^{2} (34 sq mi)

Population (2009 census)
  - Total: 11,961
  - Density: 140/km^{2} (360/sq mi)
- Time zone: UTC+0 (GMT)

Niagadina is a village and rural commune in the Cercle of Kati in the Koulikoro Region of south-western Mali. The commune has an area of 87 square kilometers and includes five villages. The administrative center is the village of Niagadina which lies on the right bank of the Niger River, 72 km southwest of Bamako, the Malian capital. In the 2009 census the commune had a population of 11,961.
