= Tougouni =

- Commune and town
- Location in Mali
- Coordinates: 13°13′N 7°12′W
- Country: Mali
- Region: Koulikoro Region
- Cercle: Koulikoro Cercle

Population (1998)
  - Total: 8,579
- Time zone: UTC+0 (GMT)

Tougouni is a small town and commune in the Cercle of Koulikoro in the Koulikoro Region of south-western Mali. As of 1998 the commune had a population of 8579.
