= Bougoula =

Bougoula may refer to:

- Bougoula, Koulikoro, Mali
- Bougoula, Sikasso, Mali
