= Daban =

Daban may refer to:

== Places ==
- Three towns of the same name (Chinese: 大板镇; pinyin: Dàbǎn Zhèn) in China:
  - Daban Town (Chifeng), a town in Bairin Right Banner, Inner Mongolia
  - Daban Town (Fuxin), a town in Fuxin, Liaoning
  - Daban Town (Chaoyang), a town in Beipiao, Liaoning
- Daban, Kati Cercle, a village and rural commune in the Kati Cercle in the Koulikoro Region, Mali
- Daban, Russia, a selo in Olyokminsky District of the Sakha Republic, Russia
- Daban (village), a village in Fujian, China
- The Chinese name (Chinese: 大阪; pinyin: Dàbǎn) for Osaka, a city in Japan

== People ==
- Jacques Tisné Daban, mayor of Aast, a commune in the Aquitane region of France, in 1871–1881
