= Dio-Gare =

- Commune and village
- Location in Mali
- Coordinates: 12°48′30″N 8°14′50″W
- Country: Mali
- Region: Koulikoro Region
- Cercle: Kati Cercle

Area
  - Total: 180 km^{2} (69 sq mi)

Population (2009 census)
  - Total: 8,161
  - Density: 45/km^{2} (120/sq mi)
- Time zone: UTC+0 (GMT)

Dio-Gare is a village and rural commune in the Cercle of Kati in the Koulikoro Region of south-western Mali. The commune has an area of 180 km^{2} and contains 7 villages. At the time of the 2009 census the commune had a population of 8,161. The main village, Dio-Gare, is 20 km northwest of Kati, the chef-lieu of the cercle. The Dakar–Niger Railway passes through the village.
