= Didieni =

- Commune and town
- Location in Mali
- Coordinates: 13°53′N 8°6′W
- Country: Mali
- Region: Koulikoro Region
- Cercle: Kolokani Cercle

Population (1998)
  - Total: 29,349
- Time zone: UTC+0 (GMT)

Didieni is a small town and commune in the Cercle of Kolokani in the Koulikoro Region of south-western Mali. As of 1998 the commune had a population of 29,349.
