= Tioribougou =

- Commune and town
- Location in Mali
- Coordinates: 13°23′N 7°59′W
- Country: Mali
- Region: Koulikoro Region
- Cercle: Kolokani Cercle

Population (1998)
  - Total: 12,166
- Time zone: UTC+0 (GMT)

Tioribougou is a small town and commune in the Cercle of Kolokani in the Koulikoro Region of south-western Mali. As of 1998 the commune had a population of 12,166.
