= Selefougou =

- Commune and town
- Location in Mali
- Coordinates: 11°45′N 8°20′W
- Country: Mali
- Region: Koulikoro Region
- Cercle: Kangaba Cercle

Population (1998)
  - Total: 4,102
- Time zone: UTC+0 (GMT)

Selefougou is a small town and commune in the Cercle of Kangaba in the Koulikoro Region of south-western Mali. As of 1998 the commune had a population of 4102.
