= Sagabala =

Coordinates: 14°06′37″N 7°53′17″W

- Commune and town
- Interactive map of Sagabala
- Country: Mali
- Region: Koulikoro Region
- Cercle: Kolokani Cercle

Population (1998)
  - Total: 15,464
- Time zone: UTC+0 (GMT)

Sagabala is a small town and commune in the Cercle of Kolokani in the Koulikoro Region of south-western Mali. As of 1998 the commune had a population of 15,464.
