= Narena =

- Commune and town
- Location in Mali
- Coordinates: 12°22′N 8°22′W
- Country: Mali
- Region: Koulikoro Region
- Cercle: Kangaba Cercle

Population (1998)
  - Total: 8,275
- Time zone: UTC+0 (GMT)

Narena is a small town and commune in the Cercle of Kangaba in the Koulikoro Region of south-western Mali. As of 1998 the commune had a population of 8,275.

Replacing a town called Menimbougou, Narena was founded in the 18th century by Bambara mercenaries who had previously defended the Sendugu region, a northern march of the Kangaba state. It was a center of gold production and iron-working.

== History and etymology ==
Narena is the original of the patronyme Konaté, and It was first named as "Gnonssonbougou". While an army invaded the village, they were forced to contribute to the war and all the houses were given to one person. So Konaté's family forced "Koman" to join the army as he was alone from his mother and was sadly worried about leaving his mother behind.

Since Koman joined the war, he became popular and a well lasting general. As his service finishes, he returns back with a lot of army. On his arrival, he said that he would destroy the city and he was banned from doing it. So people called his mother to beg him and he didn't accept and she said Koman, try to plant a good seed so you will receive good. He said that he would accept in conditions if they change the name of the village after his mother ("Naren"), it was accepted and it was renamed as "'Narena"'. Koman told his enfants who immigrated to "Kounadou" in actual Guinea and most Guinean Konates are his descendants.
