= Doumba =

- Commune and town
- Location in Mali
- Coordinates: 12°1′34″N 8°7′12″W
- Country: Mali
- Region: Koulikoro Region
- Cercle: Koulikoro Cercle

Population (1998)
  - Total: 2,647
- Time zone: UTC+0 (GMT)

Doumba is a small town and commune in the Cercle of Koulikoro in the Koulikoro Region of south-western Mali. It covers a surface of 250 km2 and comprises 7 villages: Doumba, Fani, Babougou, Dombana, Kossaba, Dibaro, and Sinzani. As of 2008 the commune had a population of 7557 inhabitants
