= Dinandougou =

Administrative region in Koulikoro Region, Mali

Coordinates: 13°10′52″N 7°06′22″W

- Commune
- Interactive map of Dinandougou
- Country: Mali
- Region: Koulikoro Region
- Cercle: Koulikoro Cercle

Area
  - Total: 206 sq mi (534 km^{2})

Population (2005)
  - Total: 17,841
  - Density: 85/sq mi (33/km^{2})
- Time zone: UTC+0 (GMT)

Dinandougou is a commune in the Cercle of Koulikoro in the Koulikoro Region of south-western Mali. The principal town lies at Kenekou and it has 28 villages: Banancoro, Bakolé, Bougoukoro, Bouramabougou, Dinan-Marka, Dinan-Bamanan, Diaguinébougou, Diecoungo, Dioni, Doubala, Donéguébougou, Fatiambougou, Gossigo, Goundando, Kakoulé, Kaliabougou, Kamani, Kassa, Mamadibougou, Ourongo, Sassila, Sirimou, Tamato, Tiécourabougou-Est, Tiécorurabougou-Ouest, Tieconungo, Tidiani-Tourébougou, and Tierkéla. As of 2005 the commune had a population of 17841.
