= Mountougoula =

- Commune and village
- Location in Mali
- Coordinates: 12°31′47″N 7°49′20″W
- Country: Mali
- Region: Koulikoro Region
- Cercle: Kati Cercle

Area
  - Total: 369 km^{2} (142 sq mi)

Population (2009 census)
  - Total: 11,814
  - Density: 32.0/km^{2} (82.9/sq mi)
- Time zone: UTC+0 (GMT)

Mountougoula is a village and rural commune in the Cercle of Kati in the Koulikoro Region of south-western Mali. The commune covers an area of 369 square kilometers and includes 16 villages and, in the 2009 census, the commune had a population of 11,814. The village of Mountougoula lies 30 km southeast of Bamako, the Malian capital.
