= Tienfala =

- Commune and town
- Location in Mali
- Coordinates: 12°44′10″N 7°45′1″W
- Country: Mali
- Region: Koulikoro Region
- Cercle: Koulikoro Cercle

Population (1998)
  - Total: 4,128
- Time zone: UTC+0 (GMT)

Tienfala is a small town and commune on the Niger River in the Cercle of Koulikoro in the Koulikoro Region of south-western Mali. As of 1998 the commune had a population of 4128. It is located 30 kilometres from Bamako.
