= Safo, Mali =

Safo
- Commune and village
- Location in Mali
- Coordinates: 12°46′7″N 7°55′43″W
- Country: Mali
- Region: Koulikoro Region
- Cercle: Kati Cercle

Area
  - Total: 307 km^{2} (119 sq mi)

Population (2009 census)
  - Total: 16,066
  - Density: 52.3/km^{2} (136/sq mi)
- Time zone: UTC+0 (GMT)

Safo is a village and rural commune in the Cercle of Kati in the Koulikoro Region of south-western Mali. The commune has an area of approximately 307 square kilometers and includes 14 villages. In the 2009 census the commune had a population of 16,066. The village of Safo is 20 km northeast of Bamako, the Malian capital.
