= Benkadi Habaladougou =

- Commune
- Location in Mali
- Coordinates: 12°2′40″N 8°37′41″W
- Country: Mali
- Region: Koulikoro Region
- Cercle: Kangaba Cercle

Population (1998)
  - Total: 22,949
- Time zone: UTC+0 (GMT)

Benkadi Habaladougou is a commune in the Cercle of Kangaba in the Koulikoro Region of south-western Mali. The principal town lies at Kéniéba. As of 1998 the commune had a population of 22,949.
