= Neguela =

- Town
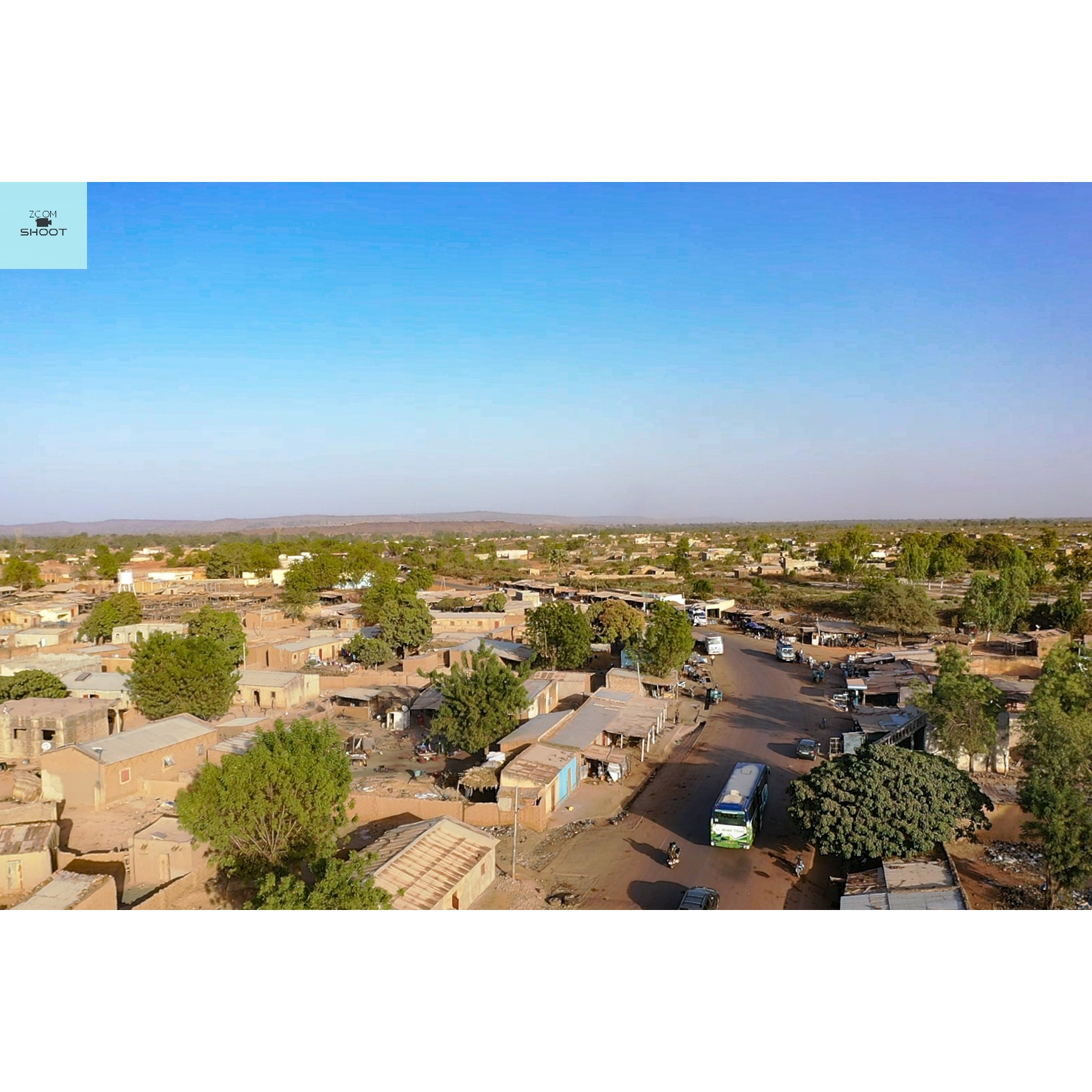

- Location in Mali
- Coordinates: 12°51′51″N 8°27′6″W
- Country: Mali
- Region: Koulikoro Region
- Cercle: Neguela
- Commune: Bossofala
- Elevation: 350 m (1,150 ft)
- Time zone: UTC+0 (GMT)

Neguela is a town in the Koulikoro Region of south-western Mali. Its part of the municipality of Bossofala and main town of the Circle of Neguela. It lies 61 km northwest of Bamako, the Malian capital.

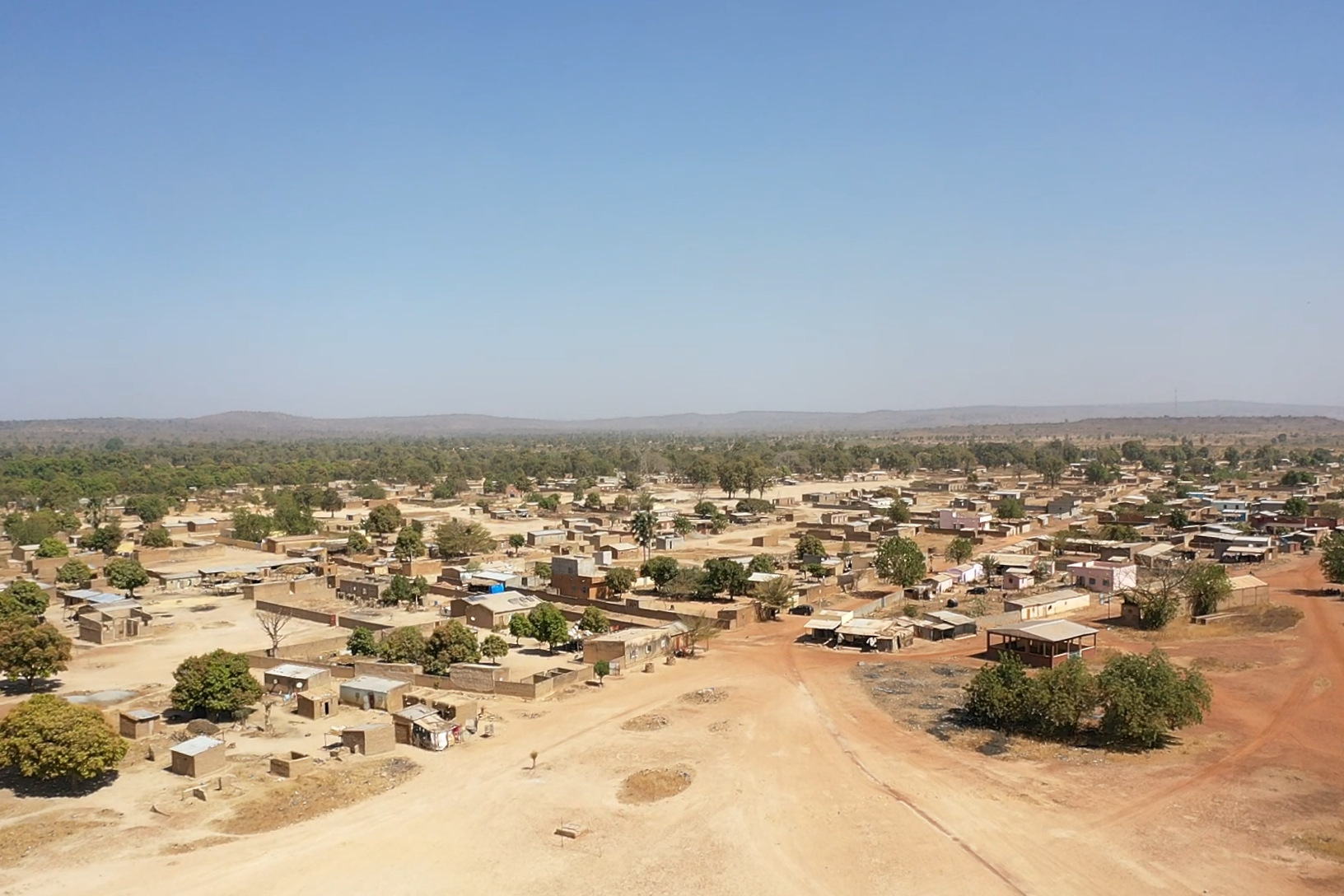
Neguela vue de ciel
