= Ouolodo =

- Commune and town
- Location in Mali
- Coordinates: 13°12′N 7°56′W
- Country: Mali
- Region: Koulikoro Region
- Cercle: Kolokani Cercle

Population (1998)
  - Total: 10,483
- Time zone: UTC+0 (GMT)

Ouolodo is a small town and commune in the Cercle of Kolokani in the Koulikoro Region of south-western Mali. As of 1998 the commune had a population of 10,483.
