= N'Gouraba =

- Commune and village
- Location in Mali
- Coordinates: 12°25′30″N 7°29′25″W
- Country: Mali
- Region: Koulikoro Region
- Cercle: Kati Cercle

Area
  - Total: 579 km^{2} (224 sq mi)

Population (2009 census)
  - Total: 15,474
  - Density: 26.7/km^{2} (69.2/sq mi)
- Time zone: UTC+0 (GMT)

N'Gouraba is a village and rural commune in the Cercle of Kati in the Koulikoro Region of south-western Mali. The commune covers an area of 579 square kilometers and includes 13 villages. In the 2009 census the commune had a population of 15,474. The village of N'Gouraba is 75 km southeast of the Malian capital, Bamako.
