= Dialakoroba =

- Commune and village
- Location in Mali
- Coordinates: 12°15′46″N 7°55′37″W
- Country: Mali
- Region: Koulikoro Region
- Cercle: Kati Cercle

Population (2009 census)
  - Total: 22,907
- Time zone: UTC+0 (GMT)

Dialakoroba is a village and rural commune in the Cercle of Kati in the Koulikoro Region of south-western Mali. The commune contains 24 villages and in the 2009 census had a population of 22,907. The village of Dialakoroba lies on the Route Nationale 7 (RN7) 50 km south of Bamako, the Malian capital.
