= Oumou Sall Seck =

Malian politician and diplomat (born 1968)

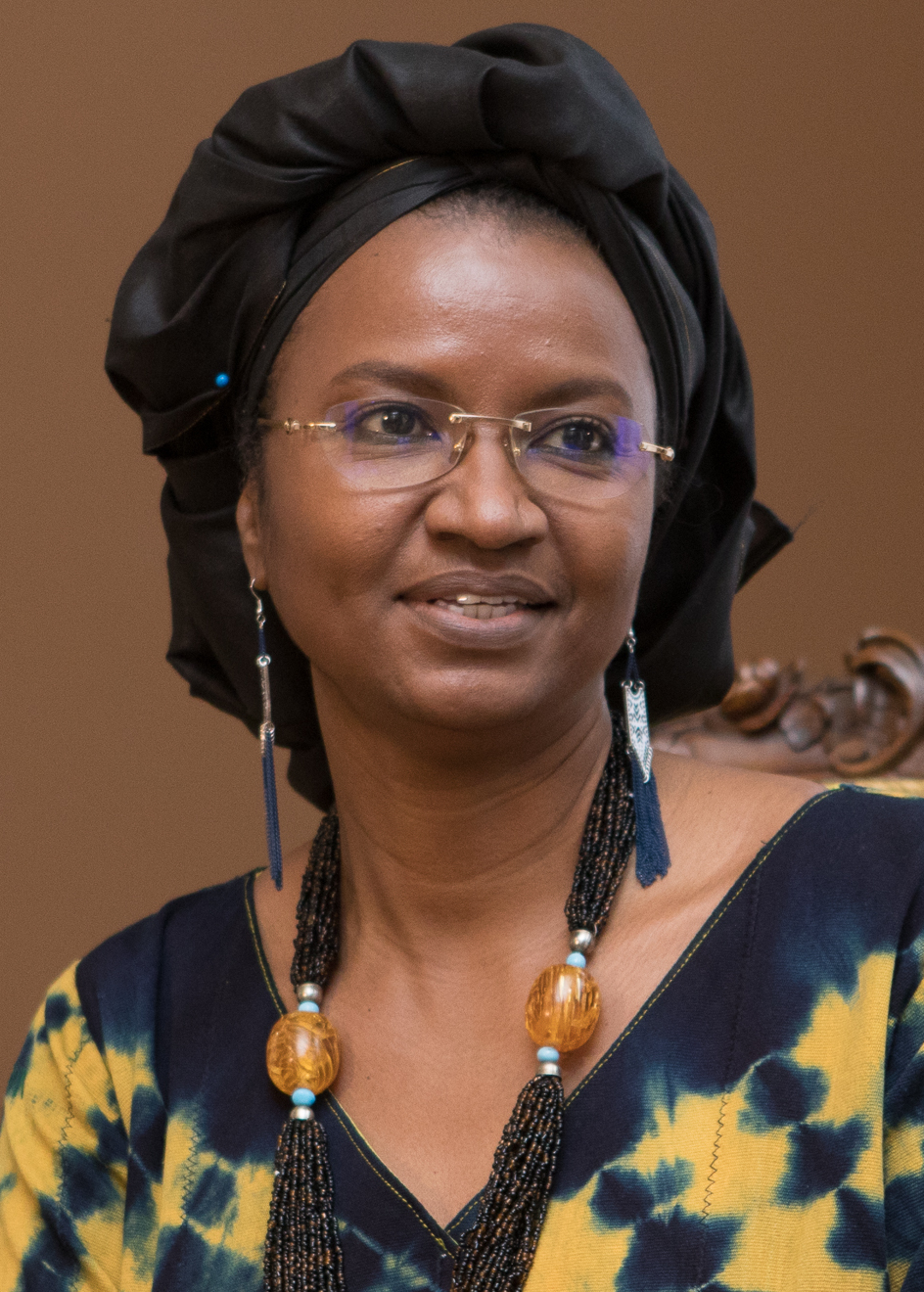
- Oumou in 2020

Ambassador of Mali to Germany
- In office 31 May 2018 – 2023
- President: Ibrahim Boubacar Keïta; Assimi Goïta; Bah Ndaw; Assimi Goïta
- Preceded by: Toumani Djimé Diallo
- Succeeded by: Cheick Mahamadou Chérif Keïta

Mayor of Goundam
- In office June 2004 – 31 May 2018

Personal details
- Born: 19 August 1968
- Party: PDES (until 2011); URD (2011–2016)
- Education: Mandé Bukari University

Oumou Sall Seck (born 19 August 1968) is a Malian politician and ambassador.

== Early life, education, and career ==
Oumou was born on 19 August 1968 to a Songhai father and a Tuareg mother. Before she became mayor, she worked as a businesswoman selling cosmetic products. She studied Cooperation and Development in Mandé Bukari University and graduated in 2013 and earned a certificate in International Law and Comparative Human Rights Law from International Institute of Human Rights in 2017. In 2002, Oumou supported Amadou Toumani Touré's candidacy during the 2002 Malian presidential election.

== Mayor of Goundam ==
Oumou ran for the 2004 Goundam mayoral election after her male colleague persuaded her to participate. During the election campaign, she promised to build the town's health center and women's multifunctional spaces and assist FGM victims. In June 2004, she won the election, making her the first woman mayor in northern Mali. On 23 May 2009, she was reelected as the mayor of Goundam for the second term. Shortly before the 2016 mayoral election, Oumou left the URD party for disagreements on several issues, causing the URD to ally with RPM and APR to defeat her. Nevertheless, she won again the Goundam mayoral election as an independent candidate in November 2016 for the third term.

During his tenure as Mayor of Goundam from 2004 to 2018, she built a women's community service, health center, water supply, basketball court, local product transformation, schools, kindergarten, independence square, public lighting, and a bridge. She also constructed the town municipal building that replaced the poor-condition town hall, which was completed in 2017. Alongside this infrastructure improvement work, she also campaigned against female genital mutilation in Goundam. Due to her work, Goundam became the example for other municipalities in the Tombouctou Region in terms of education, health, economic development, public lighting, women's rights, training, and retraining of FGM victims. She was named the most popular Malian female politician in 2013.

While serving as the mayor of Goundam, she also held various positions such as First Secretary of “Communication of the Association of Municipalities of Mali” (2005–2010), Director of the board of Directors of the National Agency for Territorial Communities Investments” ANICT (2005–2011), 8th vice-president of the “National Executive Committee” (CENA) of the Citizen Movement (2009–2010), 8th Vice President of URD party (2011–2016), and Member of the Office of the Commissioner for Security Sector Reform CSSR (2017–present). Apart from that, she joined PDES and left the party on 28 September 2011. In 2012, she founded the Movement “Trait-d'Union” in response to the 2012 conflict.

In 2012, Northern Mali faced a conflict between the government forces and MNLA and Ansar Dine. Oumou was forced to flee for her life from Goundam to Bamako on 13 April. The next day, Goundam fell to MNLA. During her exile, she wrote an opinion piece in the New York Times demanding the US and France intervention to assist Mali in capturing the jihadist-controlled territories in northern Mali. She only returned to Goundam in May 2013 after the gendarmes and Burkinabe contingent of AFISMA arrived and stationed at the town.

In 2015, Oumou took part in the Algiers Talks. At the same year, she also became the mediator in Ber for the release of ten hostages.

== Diplomatic career ==
On 26 December 2017, Ibrahim Boubacar Keïta announced that Oumou would be the Ambassador of Mali to Germany, replacing Toumani Djime Djallo. She was officially became the Ambassador of Mali to Germany on 31 May 2018, thus ending her mayoral career. On 19 July 2018, she presented her credentials as an ambassador to Frank-Walter Steinmeier at Bellevue Palace. Other than Germany, she is also accredited to Austria, Denmark, Finland, Iceland, Norway, Poland, Czech Republic, Sweden, Lithuania, Estonia, and Latvia.

She stepped down from her position as an ambassador of Mali to Germany in 2023 and Cheick Mahamadou Chérif Keïta replaced her.

== Post-diplomatic career ==
Assimi Goïta appointed Oumou as the member of the steering committee for Inter-Malian dialogue on 31 January 2024.

== Personal life ==
Oumou speaks English and French.

== Awards ==
- Oumou received the Peace Prize of the Paul Litzer Foundation for fighting against female circumcisions and Initiative Trophy from Airness Group in 2008.
- The Embassy of the United States of America in Mali awarded Oumou "Women In Excellence" in 2010.
- Oumou gained a medal from the Crans Montana Forum Foundation for her commitment to the promotion and protection of women, the strengthening of resilience and well-being of women, peace, and reconciliation in Mali.
- In 2016, Oumou received Mano Dayak Foundation Prize for her commitment to peace in West Africa, especially in Mali.
- On 27 October 2017, the Tumast Cultural Center awarded Oumou the Peace Prize.
- Oumou was honoured as a knight of the National Order of Mali in late 2018.
- On 20 November 2018, the Government of Navarre awarded her the XVI International Solidarity Prize.
