= Kambila =

- Commune and village
- Location in Mali
- Coordinates: 12°47′48″N 8°6′12″W
- Country: Mali
- Region: Koulikoro Region
- Cercle: Kati Cercle

Area
  - Total: 429 km^{2} (166 sq mi)

Population (2009 census)
  - Total: 13,974
  - Density: 32.6/km^{2} (84.4/sq mi)
- Time zone: UTC+0 (GMT)

Kambila is a village and rural commune in the Cercle of Kati in the Koulikoro Region of south-western Mali. The commune has an area of 429 km^{2} and contains 15 villages. In the 2009 census the commune had a population of 13,974. The village of Kambila lies just to the east of the Route Nationale 1 (RN1) and 9 km north of Kati, the chef-lieu of the cercle.
