= Balan Bakama =

Coordinates: 11°53′20″N 8°21′43″W

- Commune
- Interactive map of Balan Bakama
- Country: Mali
- Region: Koulikoro Region
- Cercle: Kangaba Cercle

Population (1998)
  - Total: 4,767
- Time zone: UTC+0 (GMT)

Balan Bakama is a commune in the Cercle of Kangaba in the Koulikoro Region of south-western Mali. The principal town lies at Namakama. As of 1998 the commune had a population of 4767.
