= Kalifabougou =

- Commune and town
- Location in Mali
- Coordinates: 12°57′8″N 8°10′23″W
- Country: Mali
- Region: Koulikoro Region
- Cercle: Kati Cercle

Area
  - Total: 241 km^{2} (93 sq mi)

Population (2009 census)
  - Total: 4,796
  - Density: 19.9/km^{2} (51.5/sq mi)
- Time zone: UTC+0 (GMT)

Kalifabougou is a small town and rural commune in the Cercle of Kati in the Koulikoro Region of south-western Mali. The commune includes 12 villages and covers an area of 241 km^{2}. In the 2009 census the population of the commune was 4,796. The village of Kalifabougou is 30 km northwest of Kati, the chef-lieu of the cercle.

Kalifabougou was the center of a Kafo, a vassal to Bamako, in the 18th and 19th centuries. The kafo-tigi was elected from among the local Konate family, but had to be approved in Bamako, and was obliged to send troops when war was declared.
