= Nouga =

Coordinates: 12°00′55″N 8°43′44″W

- Commune
- Interactive map of Nouga
- Country: Mali
- Region: Koulikoro Region
- Cercle: Kangaba Cercle

Population (1998)
  - Total: 7,736
- Time zone: UTC+0 (GMT)

Nouga is a commune in the Cercle of Kangaba in the Koulikoro Region of south-western Mali. The principal town lies at Keliegoue. As of 1998 the commune had a population of 7736.
