= Bancoumana =

Bancoumana ߓߊ߲߬ߞߎ߬ߡߊ߲߬ߠߊ߫
- Commune and town
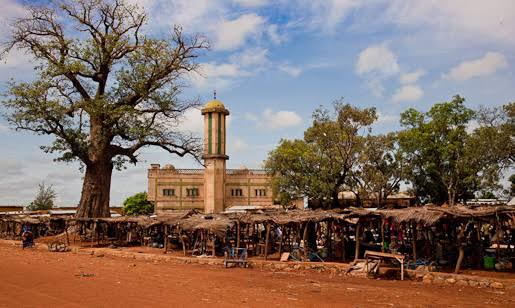
- The Bancoumana market and mosque

- Location in Mali
- Coordinates: 12°12′17″N 8°16′0″W
- Country: Mali
- Region: Koulikoro Region
- Cercle: Kati Cercle

Population (2009)
  - Total: 21,714
- Time zone: UTC+0 (GMT)

Bancoumana or Bankoumana (Bambara: ߓߊ߲߬ߞߎ߬ߡߊ߲߬ߠߊ߫) is a small town and rural commune in the Cercle of Kati in the Koulikoro Region of southwestern Mali. The commune includes the town and 13 villages. At the time of the 2009 census it had a population of 21,714. The town lies on the left bank of the River Niger 60 km southwest of Bamako, the Malian capital.
