= Yélékébougou =

- Commune and village
- Location in Mali
- Coordinates: 12°58′25″N 8°2′25″W
- Country: Mali
- Region: Koulikoro Region
- Cercle: Kati Cercle

Area
  - Total: 288 km^{2} (111 sq mi)

Population (2009 census)
  - Total: 7,257
  - Density: 25.2/km^{2} (65.3/sq mi)
- Time zone: UTC+0 (GMT)

Yélékébougou is a village and rural commune in the Cercle of Kati in the Koulikoro Region of south-western Mali. The commune has an area of approximately 288 square kilometers and includes 16 villages. In the 2009 census the commune had a population of 7,257. The village of Yélékébougou is 30 km north of the town of Kati, the chef-lieu of the cercle.
