= Sirakorola =

Coordinates: 13°17′N 7°34′W

- Commune and town
- Interactive map of Sirakorola
- Country: Mali
- Region: Koulikoro Region
- Cercle: Koulikoro Cercle

Population (1998)
  - Total: 27,859
- Time zone: UTC+0 (GMT)

Sirakorola is a small town and commune in the Cercle of Koulikoro in the Koulikoro Region of south-western Mali. As of 1998 the commune had a population of 27859. It is located 18 kilometres from Koulikoro city.
