= Sangarébougou =

- Commune and town
- Location in Mali
- Coordinates: 12°41′3″N 7°55′40″W
- Country: Mali
- Region: Koulikoro Region
- Cercle: Kati Cercle

Area
  - Total: 20 km^{2} (7.7 sq mi)

Population (2009 census)
  - Total: 45,518
- Time zone: UTC+0 (GMT)

Sangarébougou is a suburb of Bamako, the capital of Mali, and a commune in the Cercle of Kati in the Koulikoro Region of south-western Mali. The commune lies to the northeast of Commune I of Bamako and around 10 km from the city center. The commune covers and area of 20 square kilometers and in the 2009 census had a population of 45,518.
