= Sanankoro Djitoumou =

- Commune and village
- Location in Mali
- Coordinates: 12°3′18″N 7°42′22″W
- Country: Mali
- Region: Koulikoro Region
- Cercle: Kati Cercle

Area
  - Total: 630 km^{2} (240 sq mi)

Population (2009 census)
  - Total: 13,382
  - Density: 21/km^{2} (55/sq mi)
- Time zone: UTC+0 (GMT)

Sanankoro Djitoumou is a village and rural commune in the Cercle of Kati in the Koulikoro Region of southern Mali. The commune covers an area of approximately 630 square kilometers and includes 27 villages. In the 2009 census it had a population of 13,382. The village lies 75 km south of the Malian capital, Bamako.
