= Boucle du Baoulé National Park =

National park in Mali

- Boucle du Baoulé National Park
- IUCN category II (national park)
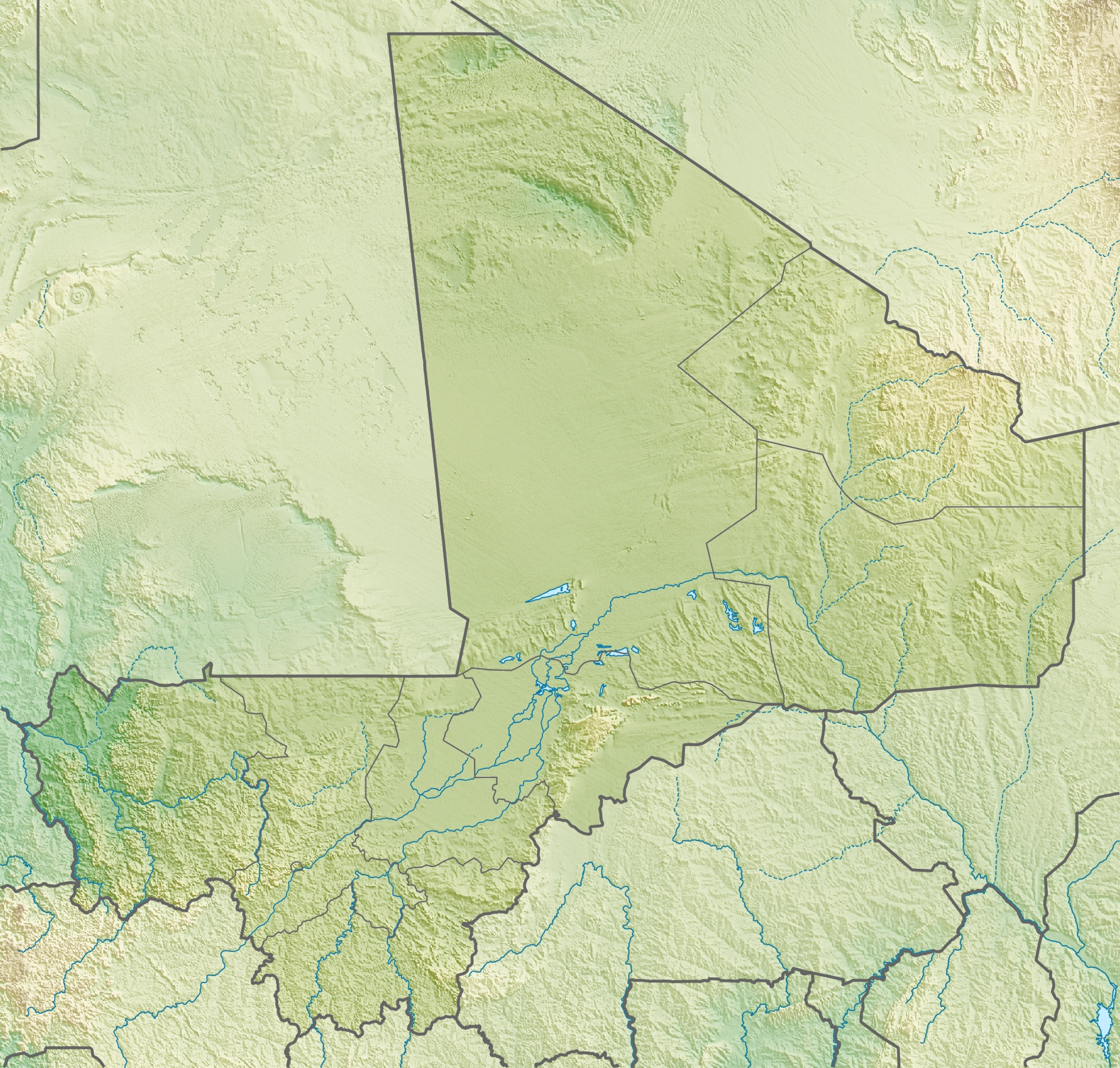
- Location within Mali
- Coordinates: 14°0′N 9°0′W
- Area: 25,330 km^{2} (9,780 sq mi)
- Established: 1982

The Boucle du Baoulé National Park (French: Parc National de la Boucle du Baoulé) lies in western Mali, in Kayes Region and Koulikoro Region, set up in 1982. It covers an area of 25,330 km^{2} (9,780 sq mi) but has little large wildlife. The park is known for its prehistoric rock art and tombs. It is part of the UNESCO Boucle du Baoulé Biosphere Reserve, along with Badinko Faunal Reserve to the southwest, Fina Faunal Reserve to the south, and Kongossambougou Faunal Reserve to the northeast.

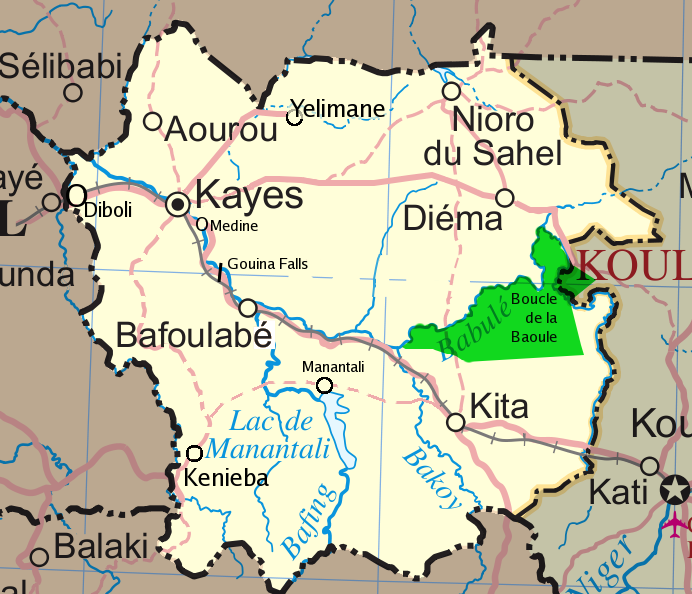
Park (green shading) in the east of Kayes Region of southwestern Mali.

== The park ==
Mali is one of the sub-Saharan countries most affected by drought and over-grazing by livestock, putting its ecology and biodiversity under pressure. The Boucle du Baoulé National Park was created to try to address this issue. It is part of a complex which also includes the Badinko Faunal Reserve, the Fina Faunal Reserve, the Kongossambougou Faunal Reserve and the Bossofola Forest Reserve. These preserved areas consist of desert and semi-desert areas, and include dry, lightly-wooded savannah, riverine forest and thorn scrub. Much of the large animal population in the country occurs in these types of habitat.

Management of the park comes under the National Parks Department of the Ministry of Natural Resources and Animal Husbandry. However the International Union for Conservation of Nature considers that the control of protected areas within the country has been ineffective, with continuing illegal hunting and encroachment on the reserves by villagers for pastoralism and agriculture.

A population of the critically endangered Western chimpanzee is present in the park, where it faces threats from poaching and habitat destruction.

The park has been designated an Important Bird Area by BirdLife International because it supports significant populations of many bird species.

== World Heritage status ==
This site was added to the UNESCO World Heritage Tentative List on September 8, 1999, as a biosphere reserve in the Cultural category.
