= Beledougou =

Beledougou (fr. Bélédougou) is an historic region of the pre-colonial Bambara Empire in today's central Mali. In the Bambara language the name literally means "County of the gravel".

A dry land on the interface of the Sahel and the wetter Sudan, it was populated by a loose confederation Bambara farming communities. Its area falls in today's Koulikoro Region, primarily in Kolokani Cercle, Koulikoro Cercle, Banamba Cercle, and parts of Nara Cercle. Much of pre-colonial Beledougou remained staunchly animist after the fall of the Bambara Empire. In 1915, it was the scene of a major revolt against French forced conscription, in a rising led by Koumi Diosse Traore.

== See also ==
- Kala (province)
- Bendugu (province)
