= Bougoula, Koulikoro =

Bougoula
- Commune and village
- Location in Mali
- Coordinates: 12°18′29″N 7°47′32″W
- Country: Mali
- Region: Koulikoro Region
- Cercle: Kati Cercle
- Elevation: 348 m (1,142 ft)

Population (2009)
  - Total: 10,780
- Time zone: UTC+0 (GMT)

Bougoula is a village and rural commune in the Cercle of Kati in the Koulikoro Region of south-western Mali. The commune contains 11 villages and at the time of the 2009 census had a population of 10,780. The village of Bougoula is 50 km south of the Malian capital, Bamako.
