= Mandé, Mali =

Mandé
- Commune
- Location in Mali
- Coordinates: 12°32′44″N 8°5′8″W
- Country: Mali
- Region: Koulikoro Region
- Cercle: Koulikoro Cercle

Area
  - Total: 730 km^{2} (280 sq mi)

Population (2009 census)
  - Total: 59,352
  - Density: 81/km^{2} (210/sq mi)
- Time zone: UTC+0 (GMT)

Map of Mali showing Koulikoro Region

Mandé is a commune in the Cercle of Kati in the Koulikoro Region of south-western Mali The commune lies to the southwest of Bamako, the Malian capital, along the left bank of the Niger River. It covers for an area of 730 km^{2} and includes the small town of Ouezzindougou, the administrative centre, and 24 villages. In the 2009 census the commune had a population of 59,352.
