= Koula, Koulikoro =

Koula
- Commune and town
- Location in Mali
- Coordinates: 13°7′N 7°39′W
- Country: Mali
- Region: Koulikoro Region
- Cercle: Koulikoro Cercle

Area
  - Total: 48 sq mi (125 km^{2})

Population (2008)
  - Total: 17,953
  - Density: 372.0/sq mi (143.62/km^{2})
- Time zone: UTC+0 (GMT)

Koula is a small town and commune in the Cercle of Koulikoro in the Koulikoro Region of north-western Mali. As of 2008 the commune had a population of 17953. It is located 18 kilometres from Koulikoro city.
