= Organization for Community Supported Sustainable Agriculture in Chad =

Organization for Community Supported Sustainable Agriculture in Chad is a non-profit organization founded in 2003 by 40-year-old, Chadian scholar and graduate of Brigham Young University, Toupta Boguena. OCSSAC, which has about 100 members, most of whom are from Utah, United States, provides clothes, medical and farming supplies, and helps build local infrastructure. The organization has drilled two wells, established a computer training center, donated two incubators to a hospital, gave out birthing kits to a clinic in the capital N'Djamena, loaned $1500 to 86 women to help them start small businesses and teach them the benefit of long-term saving.

The organization plans to dig wells in the remaining six villages, plant a 5,000 acre (20 km²) community garden, and set up their own clinic.
