= Badinko Faunal Reserve =

Protected area in Mali

- Réserve du Badinko
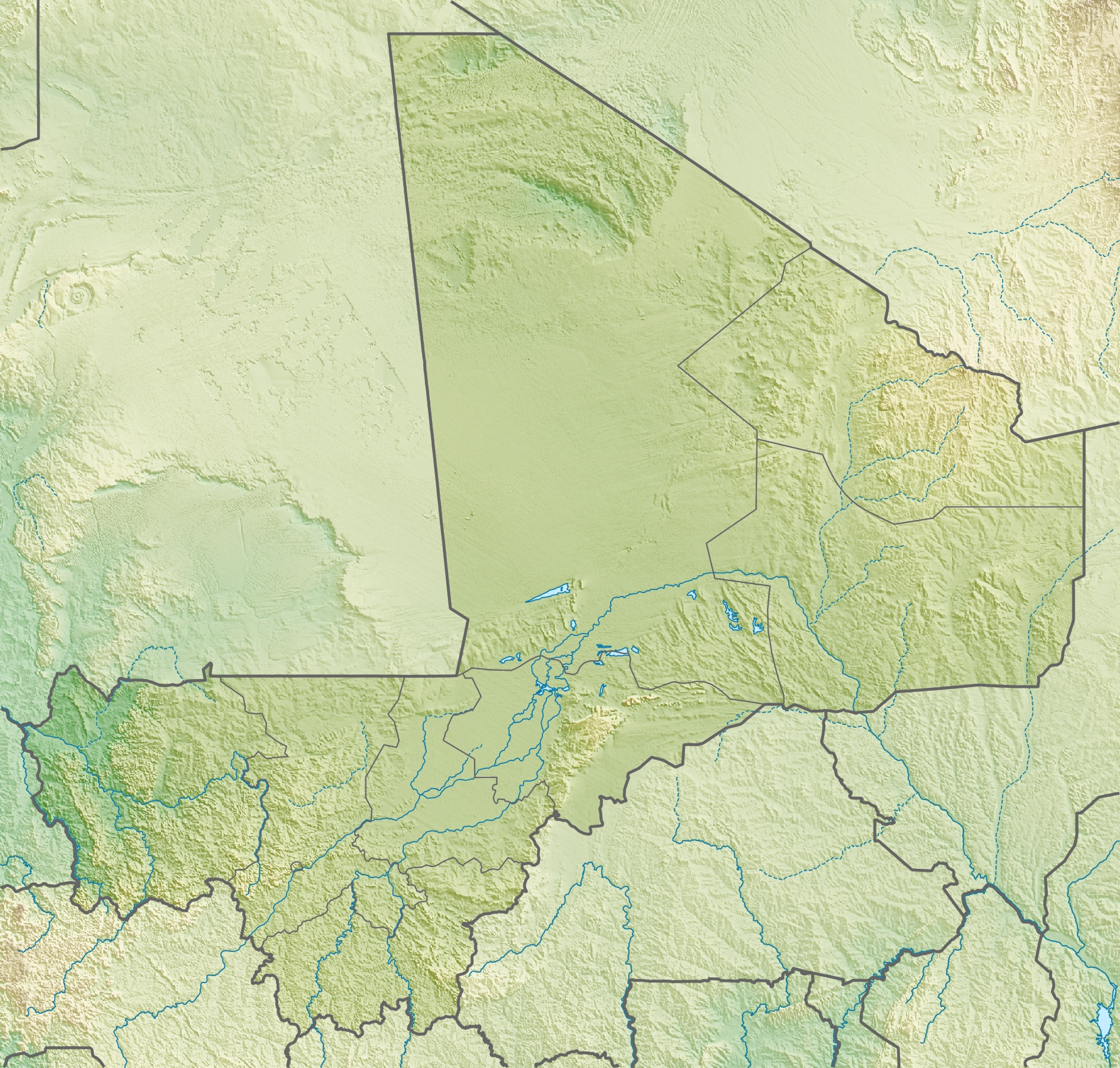
- Location within Mali
- Nearest city: Bamako
- Coordinates: 13.494°N 10.018°W
- Area: 1,377 square kilometres (532 sq mi)
- Established: January 1, 1951

The Badinko Faunal Reserve (French: Réserve du Badinko) is on the West African savanna in southwestern Mali. It is part of the UNESCO Boucle du Baoulé Biosphere Reserve, along with Boucle du Baoulé National Park, which is immediately to the northeast of Badinko. The reserve is about 140 km northwest of the capital city of Bamako. It is in Kita Cercle of Kayes Region.

The area is heavily disturbed by human pressures, particularly pastoral grazing, hunting and woodcutting; few large mammals remain. The vegetation is West Sudanian savanna, with some dense woodlands along the Baoule River. Established in 1951, the reserve's boundaries redefined periodically thereafter to accommodate human settlement.

Although it occupies a relatively large area (25,330 km^{2}), it is sparsely populated by large wild animals. The park is famous for its prehistoric tombs and rock art.
