= List of Intangible Cultural Heritage elements in Mali =

Location of Mali

The United Nations Educational, Scientific and Cultural Organization (UNESCO) defines intangible cultural heritage elements as non-physical traditions and practices performed by a people. As part of a country's cultural heritage, they include celebrations, festivals, performances, oral traditions, music, and the making of handicrafts. The term intangible cultural heritage is formally established by the Convention for the Safeguarding of the Intangible Cultural Heritage, which was drafted in 2003 and took effect in 2006. The inscription of new heritage elements on UNESCO's Intangible Cultural Heritage Lists for protection and safeguarding is determined by the Intergovernmental Committee for the Safeguarding of Intangible Cultural Heritage, an organization established by the convention. Mali ratified the convention on 3 June 2005. It served on the Intangible Cultural Heritage Committee from 2006 to 2010.

National lists are required by the convention for the further nomination of elements to the UNESCO lists.

== Intangible Cultural Heritage of Humanity ==
UNESCO's Intangible Cultural Heritage of Humanity consists of three lists: the Representative List of the Intangible Cultural Heritage of Humanity, the List of Intangible Cultural Heritage in Need of Urgent Safeguarding, and the Register of Good Safeguarding Practices. Mali has elements inscribed on the Representative and Urgent Safeguarding lists.

† Transnational element

=== Representative List ===
This list aims to represent the intangible cultural heritage of Mali worldwide and bring awareness to its significance.

Intangible Cultural Heritage elements recognized by UNESCO
Name	Media	Year	No.	Description
Cultural space of the Yaaral and Degal		2008	00132	
Septennial re-roofing ceremony of the Kamablon, sacred house of Kangaba		2009	00190	
Manden Charter, proclaimed in Kurukan Fuga	The door of the Kouroukan Fouga, in actual Kangaba, Mali: it has a sign and wooden doors with design on them.	2009	00290	
Practices and knowledge linked to the Imzad of the Tuareg communities of Algeria, Mali and Niger † (Note: Shared with Algeria and Niger.)	An Imzad from the 20th century: it resembles a bowed lute.	2013	00891	
Coming forth of the masks and puppets in Markala		2014	01004	
Cultural practices and expressions linked to Balafon and Kolintang in Mali, Burkina Faso, Côte d'Ivoire and Indonesia † (Note: Shared with Burkina Faso, Ivory Coast, and Indonesia.)	A fixed-key balafon, showing resonators with membrane	2024	02131	

=== Need of Urgent Safeguarding ===
This list covers elements that are endangered and thus require appropriate safeguarding.

Endangered elements recognized by UNESCO
Name	Media	Year	No.	Description
Sanké mon, collective fishing rite of the Sanké		2009	00289	
Secret society of the Kôrêdugaw, the rite of wisdom in Mali		2011	00520	
Cultural practices and expressions linked to the 'M'Bolon', a traditional musical percussion instrument		2021	01689	

== See also ==
- List of World Heritage Sites in Mali
- Culture of Mali
- Tourism in Mali
