= Diédougou, Kati =

Diédougou
- Commune
- Location in Mali
- Coordinates: 13°3′25″N 8°12′25″W
- Country: Mali
- Region: Koulikoro Region
- Cercle: Kati Cercle

Population (2009 census)
  - Total: 9,381
- Time zone: UTC+0 (GMT)

Diédougou is a rural commune in the Cercle of Kati in the Koulikoro Region of western Mali. The commune includes 16 villages. The main village (chef-lieu) is Torodo. In the 2009 census the commune had a population of 9,381.
