= Daban, Kati Cercle =

Daban
- Commune and village
- Location in Mali
- Coordinates: 13°13′18″N 8°18′38″W
- Country: Mali
- Region: Koulikoro Region
- Cercle: Kati Cercle

Area
  - Total: 737 km^{2} (285 sq mi)

Population (2009 census)
  - Total: 9,435
  - Density: 12.8/km^{2} (33.2/sq mi)
- Time zone: UTC+0 (GMT)

Daban is a village and rural commune in the Cercle of Kati in the Koulikoro Region of south-western Mali. The commune is the most northerly of the cercle. It contains 11 villages in an area of 737 square kilometers and at the time of 2009 census had a population of 9,435. The village of Daban is 80 km northwest of Kati, the chef-lieu of the cercle.
