= Mahmud IV =

Mahamud Hawadane محمود
- Sultan of the Majeerteen Sultanate
- Reign: ?–1815
- Predecessor: —
- Successor: `Uthman II
- Dynasty: Majeerteen dynasty
- Religion: Islam

Mahmud IV (Somali: Maxamuud IV, Arabic: محمود), also known as Mahamud Hawadane (Xawadane), was a Somali ruler. He was among the earliest Sultans of the Majeerteen Sultanate.

== Reign ==
The Majeerteen Sultanate was established around 1800 CE by Somalis from the Majeerteen Harti Darod clan. It reached prominence during the 19th century, under the reign of the resourceful Boqor (King) Osman Mahamuud.

Mahmud IV reigned from an unknown date of accession to 1815. He was succeeded atop the throne by `Uthman II.

== See also ==
- Somali aristocratic and court titles

Preceded by ?	Majeerteen Sultanate	Succeeded by `Uthman II
