= Kandadji Dam =

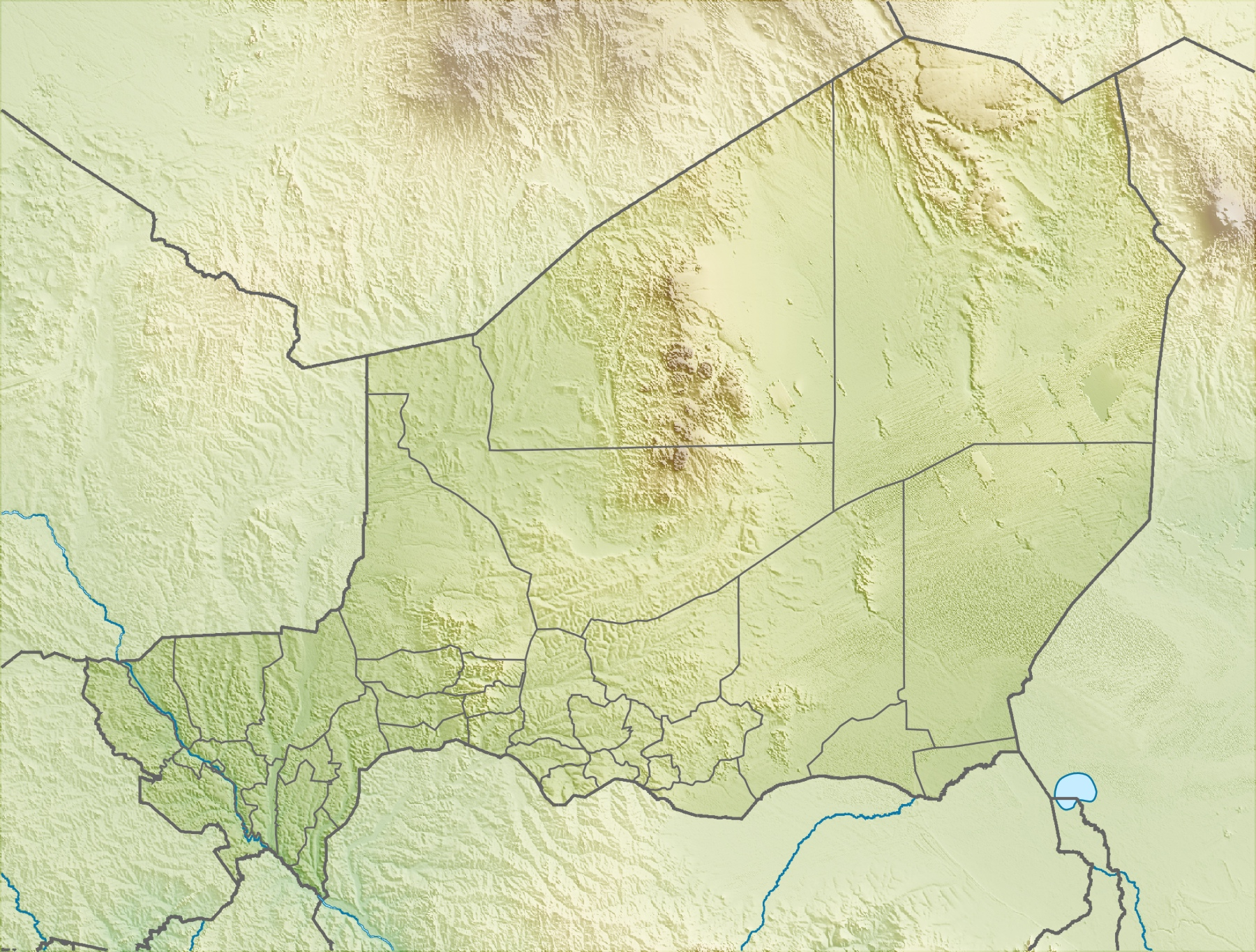
- Location within Niger
- Location: Tillabéri Department, Niger
- Coordinates: 14.6089°N 0.9872°E
- Construction began: March 2019
- Opening date: 2025 (est.)
- Construction cost: €1.2 billion
- Operator: Haut Commissariat à l'Aménagement de la Vallée du Niger (High Commission for Niger Valley)

Dam and spillways
- Impounds: Niger River
- Height: 28 m (92 ft)
- Length: 8,780 metres (9,600 yd)
- Spillway capacity: 3,150 m^{3} (111,000 cu ft)

Reservoir
- Total capacity: 1,596,000 megalitres (1,294,000 acre⋅ft)
- Surface area: 282 km^{2} (109 sq mi)
- Maximum water depth: 5.67 m (18.6 ft)

Power Station
- Commission date: 2025 (est.)
- Turbines: 4
- Installed capacity: 130 MW (170,000 hp)

The Kandadji Dam, is a large multipurpose dam under construction on the Niger River. The site is situated near the small town of Kandadji, Tillabéri Department, Tillabéri Region, Niger, 180 km northwest of the capital Niamey. It is being built by the Haut Commissariat à l'Aménagement de la Vallée du Niger (High Commission for Niger Valley), a public body under the Primer Minister's Office.

The dam will generate hydropower and is control the flow of the Niger River, holding water during the dry season to maintain a minimum flow and making downstream irrigation possible. The project is formally named the Kandadji Programme for Ecosystem Regeneration and Niger River Development (Programme Kandadji de Régénération des Ecosystèmes et de Mise en Valeur du Fleuve Niger).

== History ==
The project was first proposed in the 1970s, when a larger dam had been considered. In 1998 the African Development Bank approved funding for a feasibility study that was conducted by the German consulting firm Lahmeyer. Under the study, an environmental and social diagnosis and an initial environmental and social assessment were conducted. The findings were presented in 2002. In August 2002 the government decided by Decree to go ahead with the project, which was from that time called the Kandadji Ecosystems Regeneration and Niger Valley Development Programme. Subsequently, a detailed assessment of environmental and social impact, including a Population Resettlement Plan and a Local Development Plan, was conducted. The Local Development Plan was designed to facilitate the economic transition of displaced persons in order to restore their standard of living or even enhance it, beyond mere resettlement. The final design of the dam was prepared with financing from the Islamic Development Bank, and that of a 2,000 hectares (4,900 acres) irrigation project with financing from the West African Development Bank. In 2005 and 2006 consultations were undertaken as part of the environmental and social assessment, which included participants from the World Wide Fund for Nature and International Union for Conservation of Nature. According to one source, construction of the dam was begun in August 2008. In April 2009 a workshop on benefit sharing from dams in West Africa was held in Niamey organized by the Niger Basin Authority, the International Institute for Environment and Development and the International Union for Conservation of Nature. The workshop recommended to improve the communication towards the people affected by the dam and to pay particular attention to legal processes related to resettlement, and to continue to reflect on a future management structure to equitably share the benefits of the dam. In November 2009 a process to select consultants to accompany the resettlement has been initiated.

According to the World Bank, the entire Kandadji Program will be implemented in three phases:

- Phase I, which started in 2009 and is expected to be completed in 2016, comprises the Kandadji dam and its reservoir, the hydro-mechanical equipment for the 18 gates, economic and local community development, and implementation of environmental and social mitigation measures for resettled people;
- Phase II comprises construction of the hydropower plant, transmission lines, road, irrigated agricultural development, and expanded local and community development in the reservoir area and downstream, and
- Phase III focuses on the development of irrigated agriculture and the scaling-up of the economy and local community development of the region (including fisheries, livestock, agribusiness and trade.

Construction of the dam itself was contracted to Russian company Zarubezhvodstroy, which signed the construction contract in September 2010. Construction of the dam was relaunched at a ceremony on 23 May 2011, following the election of President Mahamadou Issoufou. The Kandaji Dam is the first object being constructed by a Russian company in Niger. In May 2011, the Director General of Zarubezhvodstroy, OJSC E.V. Gudzenchuk, announced "For the first time a Russian company is involved in building such a large project in West Africa at the expense of foreign investors. Zarubezhvodstroy has vast experience in the field that would allow us to meet the challenges with confidence and with great professionalism."

Plans were announced in June 2011 to relocate 5383 individuals and 770 families who will be displaced by the dam.

Construction of the dam was begun in August 2008. The first brick of the dam was laid by the President of Niger, Mamadou Tandja. In 2008, the dam itself was expected to be completed in 2013. By 2012, the completion date had moved to September 2015. Construction has been slower than expected, with interruptions due to financing problems; as of 2019, completion is expected in 2025. Construction works were 12% complete as of September 2019.

== Technical features ==
The earth dyke dam will be 8.4 km dam long, creating a reservoir of 1.6 billion m^{3} and a regulated discharge of 120 m^{3}/s (3.8 km^{3}/year) in Niamey. The hydroelectric plant will have a capacity of 130 megawatt, and a 132 kilovolt high voltage line will be built over 188 km to Niamey. Irrigation development will consist of a first phase of 6,000 hectares mainly for the benefit of resettled communities, with a medium-term target in 2034 of 45,000 hectares out of an irrigable potential of 122,000 hectares.

== Benefits ==
The project is a very high-profile project for Niger. According to the Prime Minister at the time of initiating construction, Seyni Oumarou, "no other development project will have sparked so much long term interest or such high expectations". The expected benefits include increased agricultural production and hydropower generation. Niger imports almost half of its electricity consumption of 440 million kilowatt-hours (1.6×10^{9} MJ) (2007) from neighboring Nigeria, which itself suffers frequent power cuts. The plant would increase installed capacity in Niger from 240 Megawatt (MW) in 2007 to 370 MW (+55%). Other expected benefits are related to "drinking water supply, sanitation, improved flood recession cropping, grazing and fishery".

== Financial costs ==
The financial costs of the broader project, including the infrastructure for irrigation and drinking water supply, were estimated at US$670 million by one source in 2007. Another source mentions US$942 million in 2011. The contract to build the dam itself, however, is apparently only worth Euro 130 million. According to the World Bank, the Kandadji Program (Phase I and Phase II) is expected to cost US$785 million.

== Financing ==
Financing comes from ten sources: the African Development Bank, the Islamic Development Bank, the West African Development Bank, the Saudi Fund for Development, the Kuwait Fund for Arab Economic Development, the OPEC Fund for International Development, the Arab Bank for Economic Development in Africa, the Bank for Investment and Development of the Economic Community of West African States (ECOWAS), the French Development Agency (AFD) and the Government of Niger.

Specific amounts are as follows, as far as known:

- US$236 million was pledged by the Islamic Development Bank.
- US$15 million was pledged by the OPEC Fund for International Development in February 2009.
- US$62 million were approved in October 2008 by the African Development Bank through a combined loan and grant.
- US$20 million were approved in January 2010 by the Saudi Development Fund.
- US$200 million from the World Bank.
- EUR50 million from the French Development Agency

Financing for the hydropower station itself is due to come from a public-private partnership.

== Environmental, social and downstream impact ==
Negative social impacts include the resettlement of almost 35,000 people from 15 villages, loss of infrastructure (a national road, boreholes, clinics, schools, mosques, slaughterhouses, markets and grain mills) and loss of about 7,000 ha of agricultural land. According to a 2007 report by UNEP's Dams and Development Project, which itself was a follow-up activity to a report by the World Commission on Dams, the Kandadji project "serves as a useful example of the projection and estimation of social effects, which appears to have been widely encompassing, covering both negative impacts and benefits". These impacts were "projected at an early stage in project planning, enabling issues and potential impacts to be addressed in subsequent planning phases".

The project is expected to improve the river's ecology, which has suffered from a 30% decline in river flows since the 1970s. The dam would regulate flows. According to press reports from Nigeria, the project would reduce the river flow to Nigeria by at least 10 percent, thus jeopardizing power production from two existing dams in Nigeria and meaning a "colossal loss (...) to the agricultural capacity of (Nigerian) states that border the River Niger". However, according to the 2008 environmental assessment of the project, the "modifications of the quantities of water flowing into the Niger River as a result of the Kandadji dam will be minimal in Nigeria". The average loss through evaporation and modification of the Niger River water flows in Nigeria will be low (2.3% at Jebba) and there will be positive impacts by improving the minimum water level in Nigeria.

== Developments ==
In August 2023 Afrik21.africa reported that China Gezhouba Group Company (CGGC), the then engineering, procurement and construction (EPC) contractor had suspend construction work on the project, following the 2023 Nigerien coup d'état. The resultant economic sanctions imposed by the European Union, the World Bank and ECOWAS made it impossible for CGGC to pay its subcontractors and its workers. Construction may resume if and when those sanctions are lifted.

== See also ==
- Kenié Hydroelectric Power Station

== Further sources ==
- Multi-purpose Projects: Kandadji Dam Niger. Lahmeyer International (2008). (Link broken)
- Assessment of the environmental impacts of the Kandadji dam project: an energy choice identified under the National Energy and Sustainable Development Program. Hassane Kimba / Nigerian Association of Environmental Impact Assessment Professionals. AJEAM-RAGEE Volume 5 April 2003; 46-54 (Link broken)
- Haut Commissariat au Barrage de Kandadji (official site). Republique du Niger: Cabinet du Premier Ministre. Retrieved 2009-02-01. (Link broken)
- Niger - Evaluation de l'effet du barrage de Kandadji sur les pêcheries du fleuve Niger. Un rapport préparé pour le projet assistance a l'Autorité du Barrage de Kandadji (ABK); Document de travail 1. (French) Welcomme, R.L., / FAO, Rome (Italy). Fisheries Dept., 1981, 7 p. Report No: FAO-FI—TCP/NER/0103(MA)
- Jamie Skinner:Niger: Tough questions posed by the Kandadji dam development, International Institute for Environment and Development, 19 April 2013
