= Fina Faunal Reserve =

Nature reserve in West Africa

The Fina Faunal Reserve is located in Mali in Africa. It was established in 1954, and is 1086 km^{2} in area.

A 2015 study found "bare land and Savannah woodland" were being "gradually replaced by agricultural land" in the reserve.
