= Niger Basin Authority =

Intergovernmental organization in West Africa

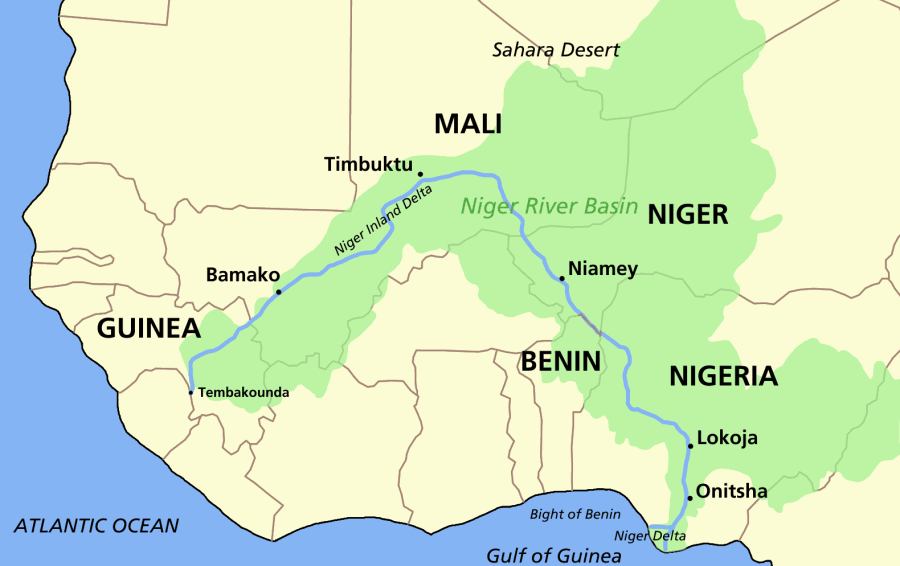
Map of the Niger River with the Niger River Basin in green

The Niger Basin Authority (French: Autorité du Bassin du Niger) is an intergovernmental organization in West Africa aiming to foster co-operation in managing and developing the resources of the basin of the Niger River. The group is referred to by both the French and English initialisms, NBA or ABN.

== Formation ==
Inspired by the Tennessee Valley Authority, the organisation was founded in 1964 as the River Niger Commission. On 21 November 1980, it was refounded as the Niger Basin Authority.

== Purpose ==
The Niger Basin Authority defines its purpose as the promotion of cooperation among member countries to ensure integrated development of resources. The organisation originally defined its mission as the cooperative management of water resources, most notably, but not limited to, the Niger River. While centering of water and hydroelectric resources, the NBA nations use the organisation to harmonise the development of energy, agriculture, forestry, transport, communications, and industrial resources of the member nations. The NBA has worked to create an "Integrated Development Plan of the Basin", especially focusing on cross boundary projects. The NBA itself has been ceded no sovereign power over resources or management, and therefore all regulation must be imposed by individual sovereign governments. While not the original focus of the NBA, environmental protection from the threats of desertification, deforestation and pollution of the rivers by agriculture and industry have become a major theme of their work.

== Structure ==
Member states of the Niger Basin Authority

Nine countries which have some of their territories in the Niger Basin are member states of the NBA: Benin, Burkina Faso, Cameroon, Chad, Côte d'Ivoire, Guinea, Mali, Niger and Nigeria. Although a small area of Algeria falls within the Niger Basin, it is not a member state of the NBA. It is based in Niamey and works in both French and English.

=== Meetings ===
Ministers representing the Authority's members meet in yearly sessions at the headquarters in Niamey, as well as locations in the member states. Additionally, the NBA heads of states and foreign contributors meet at a regular Conference of the Heads of State of the Niger Basin Authority and Partners. The 8th "Summit of the Niger Basin Authority Heads of State and Government" took place in Niamey in April 2008, and agreed on the implementation of several documents. These included the "2008-2027 Investment Programme of the River Niger Basin", the "Water Charter of the River Niger Basin", the creation of a donors' meeting for the implementation of the 2008–2012 priority five-year plan, acceleration of the Taoussa Dam project in Mali and the Kandadji Dam project in Niger.

The Authority derives funds both from member states and from international donors. The NBA participates in cooperative projects with organisations such as the World Wildlife Fund, Wetlands International, Ramsar and foreign donor governments.

== See also ==
- Azawagh – Dry basin that once carried a northern tributary of the Niger River
