= Baguinéda-Camp =

- Commune and town
- Location in Mali
- Coordinates: 12°36′55″N 7°46′36″W
- Country: Mali
- Region: Koulikoro Region
- Cercle: Kati Cercle

Area
  - Total: 987 km^{2} (381 sq mi)

Population (2009 census)
  - Total: 58,661
  - Density: 59.4/km^{2} (154/sq mi)
- Time zone: UTC+0 (GMT)

Baguinéda-Camp is a small town and rural commune in the Cercle of Kati in the Koulikoro Region of southern Mali. The commune contains 32 villages and in the 2009 census had a population of 58,661. The town lies to the south of the Niger River.
