= Mandé Bukari University =

- Université Mandé Bukari
- Type: Private university
- Established: 1999
- Founders: Chéibane Coulibaly
- President: Chéibane Coulibaly
- Location: Bamako, Mali
- Language: French

Mandé Bukari University (French: Université Mandé Bukari, abbreviated UMB) is a private institution of higher learning and research in Bamako, the capital of Mali.

== History ==
Mandé Bukari University was created in 1999 by the professor Chéibane Coulibaly. It was recognized by the Malian authorities on October 27, 2008. It was previously a member of the Agence universitaire de la Francophonie.

== Degrees offered ==
UMB provides degrees in the following subjects:

- Legal, Economic, and Political Science
- Organizational Management
- Marketing
- Accounting and Finance
- Human Resource Management
- Audit and Management Control
- IT Management
- Statistics
- Cooperations
- Development
- Law and Development
- Socioeconomics of Development
- Sociology/Anthropology
- Processing of Agro-Food Products
- Agricultural Policies and Peasant Economies
- Rural Development
- Environmental Management
- Rural Engineering
