= Koulikoro Cercle =

Coordinates: 13°05′N 7°20′W

Koulikoro
- Cercle
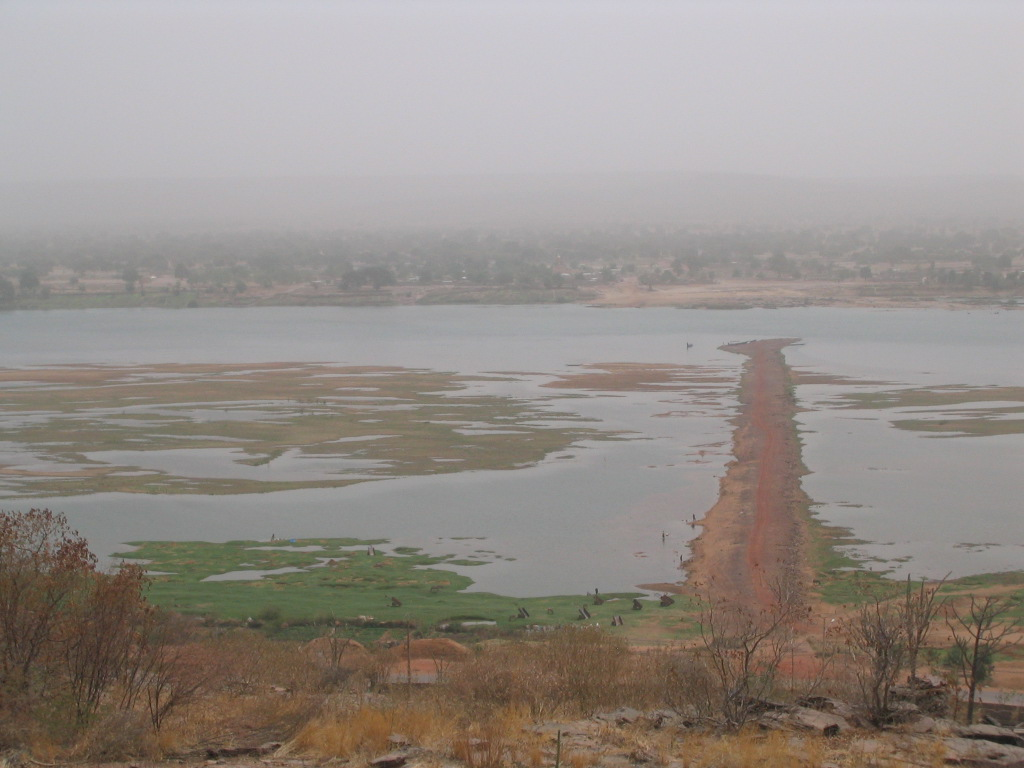
- Niger river at Koulikoro

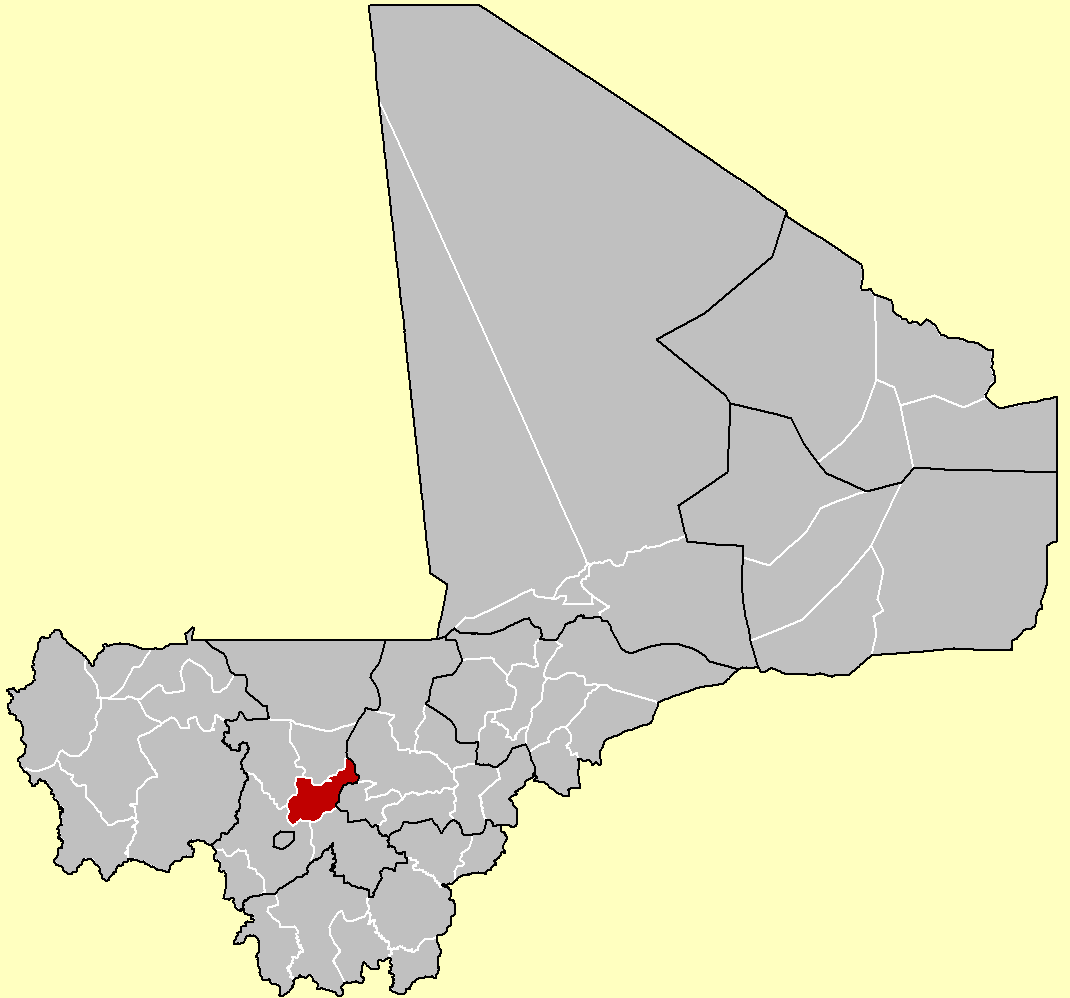
- Location of Koulikoro Cercle in Mali
- Country: Mali
- Region: Koulikoro Region
- Admin HQ (Chef-lieu): Koulikoro

Area
  - Total: 7,260 km^{2} (2,800 sq mi)

Population (2009 census)
  - Total: 211,103
  - Density: 29.1/km^{2} (75.3/sq mi)
- Time zone: UTC+0 (GMT)

Koulikoro Cercle is an administrative subdivision of the Koulikoro Region of Mali. Its seat is the town of Koulikoro, which is also the capital of the region. A major trade and industrial town on the Niger River, Koulikoro has been surpassed by Kati to the west as the largest town in the region. Also to the southwest, lying entirely within Kati Cercle but administratively separate, is the District of Bamako, which after independence was carved out of the middle of the region.

The Koulikoro Cercle is divided into nine communes:

- Dinandougou
- Doumba
- Koula
- Koulikoro
- Meguetan
- Nyamina
- Sirakorola
- Tienfala
- Tougouni

Koulikoro Cercle in the east center of Koulikoro Region, and covers over 7,000 km². It is home to primarily Bambara and Malinke farmers, including large export Mango plantations along the river. Other farm products include groundnuts, cotton, tobacco and Shea butter. The north of the Cercle is dry, Sahel land, primarily used for livestock.
