= Kangaba Cercle =

Coordinates: 11°55′N 8°35′W

Kangaba
- Cercle
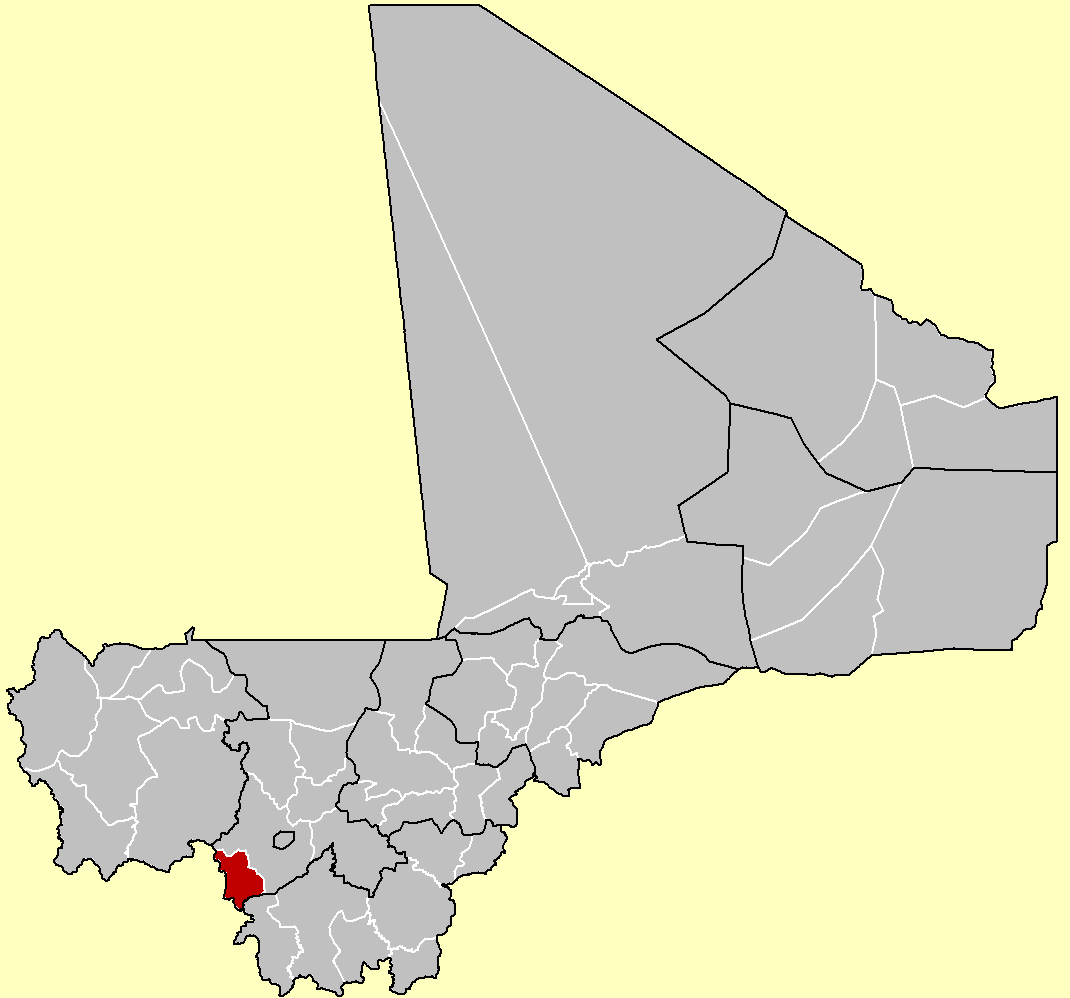
- Location of Kangaba Cercle in Mali
- Country: Mali
- Region: Koulikoro Region
- Capital: Kangaba

Area
  - Total: 5,500 km^{2} (2,100 sq mi)

Population (2009 census)
  - Total: 100,720
  - Density: 18/km^{2} (47/sq mi)
- Time zone: UTC+0 (GMT)

The Kangaba Cercle is an administrative subdivision of the Koulikoro Region of Mali. Its seat is the town and commune of Benkadi Habaladougou (Kenieba), also known as Kangaba. It lies at the southwest corner of the region, along the Guinean border, with the Niger River forming its southern edge.

The Kangaba Cercle is the smallest cercle in the Koulikoro Region, both in surface area and population. It is divided into nine communes.

- Balan Bakama
- Benkadi
- Kaniogo
- Karan
- Maramandougou
- Minidian
- Naréna
- Nouga
- Séléfougou

== History ==
The Kangaba Cercle is home to primarily Malinké farmers, and formed part of the precolonial Mali Empire as well as (first) the Ghana and Mali Empires back to the 8th century.

It was the center of Kangaba Province of the Mali Empire, and for a period after 1559, was the capital of the empire. In 1599 it became the last center for Mansa Mahmud IV after his defeat at Djenné, and a Kangaba city state survived after the empire's fall in 1610. Prior to the Mali Empire, the Manden city-state of Ka-ba (present-day Kangaba) served as the capital and name of this province. From at least the beginning of the 11th century, Mandinka kings known as faamas ruled Manden from Ka-ba in the name of the Ghanas. Sundiata Keita began his revolt against the remnants of the Ghana Empire there, and it remained the heartland of the Mali state.

The town of Habaladougou Kenieba remains an important Malinké cultural center and home to their sacred Kamablo house, traditionally rebuilt every seven years.

== Economy ==
The Cercle falls in the more fertile Sudan climate region, and forms some of the best farmland in the nation, much devoted to tobacco farming for export.

Artisanal mining has become more common in recent years due to growing demand for metals and rising prices.
