= Kati Cercle =

Coordinates: 12°30′N 8°20′W

Kati
- Cercle
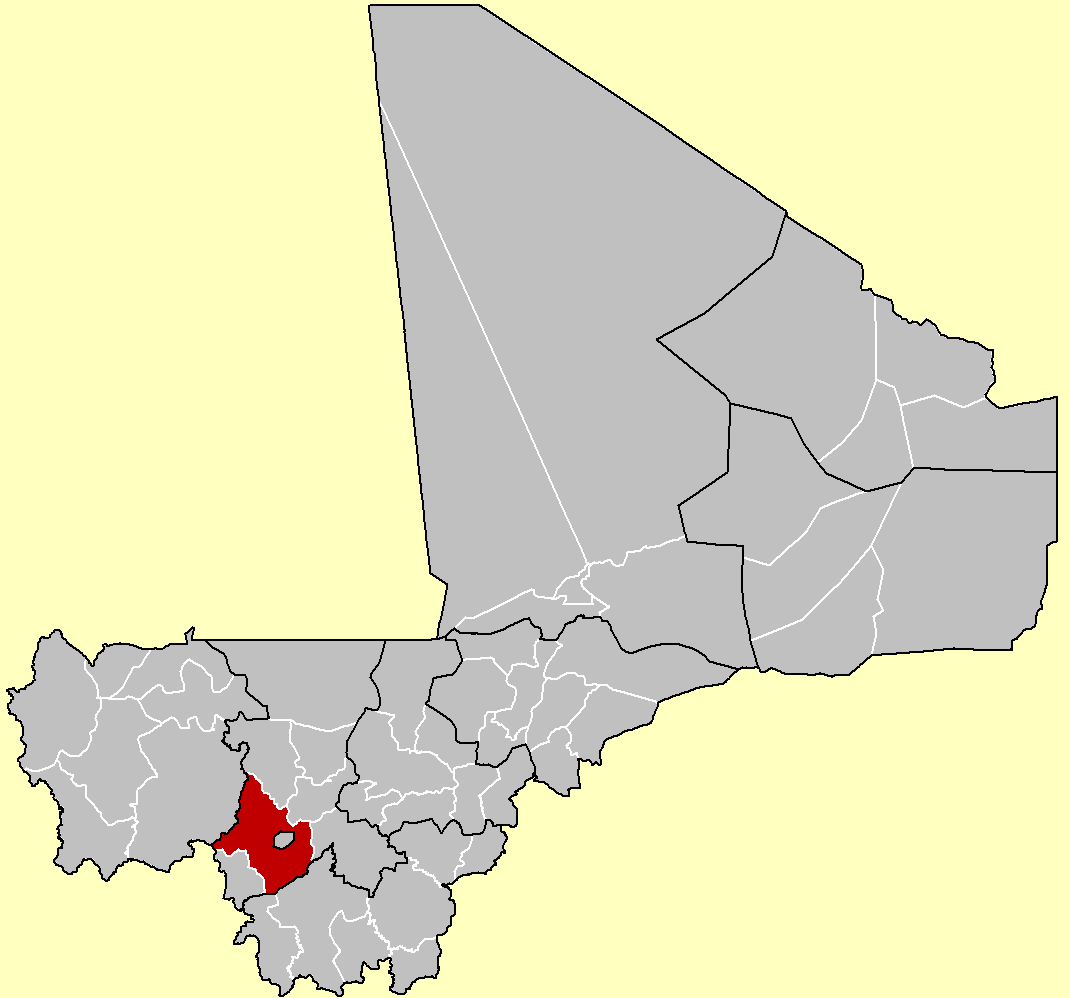
- Location of Kati Cercle in Mali
- Country: Mali
- Region: Koulikoro Region
- Admin HQ (Chef-lieu): Kati

Area
  - Total: 16,896.61 km^{2} (6,523.82 sq mi)

Population (2023 estimate (Note: Based on corrected 2022 census results))
  - Total: 901,069
  - Density: 56.11/km^{2} (145.3/sq mi)
- Time zone: UTC+0 (GMT)

Kati Cercle is an administrative subdivision of the Koulikoro Region of Mali. Its seat is the town of Kati, which is also its largest town. It lies at the southwest corner of the region, and completely surrounds the Bamako Capital District. Until the capital was hived off in 1977, the combined Cercle was called Bamako Cercle, with the capital city as its seat.

== Demographics ==
The 2009 census recorded a population of 948,128 people. In 2023 the population was estimated to be 901,069, based on corrected data from the 2022 census.

Kati Cercle is home to primarily Bambara and Malinke farmers, as well as Bozo and Fula populations. The Kati area formed part of the pre-colonial Beledougou region of the Mali Empire, Bambara Empire, and was amongst the first places colonised by the French in the last decade of the 19th century.

The Cercle falls largely south of the dryer Sahel land, in the wetter Sudan. Through it runs the fertile valley of the Niger River, home to groundnut, cotton, and tobacco farms, as well as being a major transportation and fishing resource.

== Administrative subdivisions ==
Following an administrative reorganisation of the country in 2023, the Kati Cercle is divided into the following communes: (Note: Previously, Kati included the following communes as well: Bancoumana; Bossofala; Daban; Dialakorodji; Diédougou; Dogodouman; Faraba; Kalabancoro; Kourouba; Moribabougou; N'Gabacoro; N'Tjiba; Niagadina; Nioumamakana; Ouélessébougou; Sanankoro Djitoumou; Sangarébougou; Siby; Sobra; Tiakadougou-Dialakoro)

- Baguinéda-Camp
- Bougoula
- Diago
- Dialakoroba
- Dio-Gare
- Dombila
- Doubabougou
- Kalifabougou
- Kambila
- Kati urban commune
- Mandé
- Mountougoula
- N'Gouraba
- Safo
- Sanankoroba
- Tiélé
- Yélékébougou
