= Koulikoro Region =

Region of Mali

- Region
- Location within Mali
- Interactive map of Koulikoro Region
- Coordinates: 13°56′41″N 7°37′28″W
- Country: Mali
- Capital: Koulikoro

Government
  - Governor: Lamine Kapory Sanogo

Area
  - Total: 43,290 km^{2} (16,710 sq mi)

Population (2023)
  - Total: 2,224,418
  - Density: 51.38/km^{2} (133.1/sq mi)
- Time zone: UTC±0 (UTC)
- HDI (2017): 0.437 low · 2nd

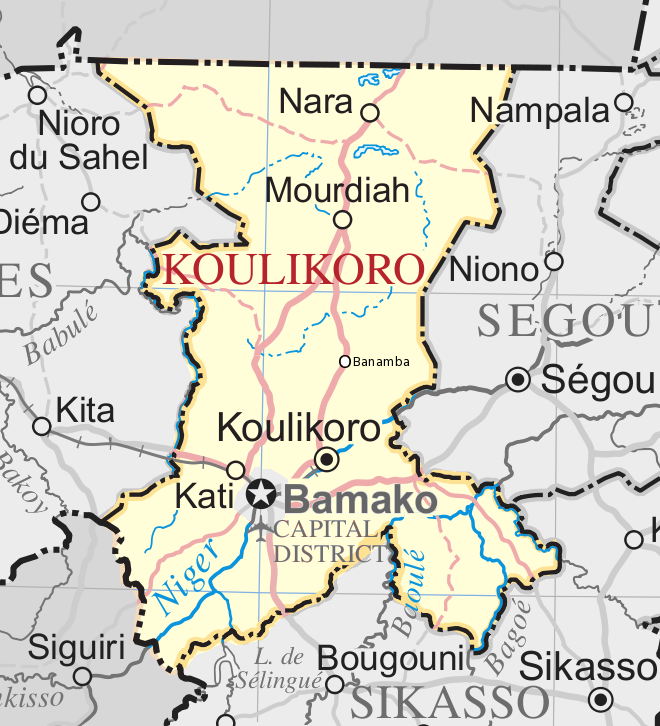
Map of Koulikoro Region (borders before 2023).

Koulikoro Region (Bambara: ߞߎߟߌߞߏߙߏ ߘߌߣߋߖߊ tr. Kulikoro Dineja) is a region in western Mali. It is the second administrative area of Mali and covers an area of 43,290 km^{2} (16,710 sq mi). Its capital city is Koulikoro.

== Geography ==
The region of Koulikoro is bordered by the regions of Nara and Nioro on the north, the region of Kita on the west, by Guinea and the region of Sikasso on the south, and by the regions of Ségou, Bougouni and Dioïla to the east. In 2023 the Koulikoro Region had a population of 2,224,418. These were mainly Bambaras, Malinkés, Soninkes and Somono around the Niger River.

The region is irrigated by several rivers, including the Niger, Baoulé, Sankarani, Baogé, Bani and Bafing. The climate of the region's south has the high rainfall typical of the Sudan, while north of the Kita-Bamako axis, it tends to a Sahelian aridity.

The largest cities of the region are Kati, Koulikoro, Kolokani, and Banamba; however the most populous commune is Kalabancoro. The Boucle du Baoulé National Park and the natural reserves of Fina, Kongossambougou and Badinko shelter a diversity of wildlife.

== History ==
The region of Koulikoro is the seat of several great empires which followed one another in Mali: the Ghana Empire, the Sosso Empire and the Mali Empire.

== Demographics ==
Ethnicity in Koulikoro region (2022)
1. Bambara (58.8%)
2. Malinké (14.1%)
3. Fula (10.0%)
4. Soninke (6.43%)
5. Dogon (2.35%)
6. Senufo (1.89%)
7. Songhai (1.15%)
8. Bobo / Bwa (1.00%)
9. Other (4.24%)

The Koulikoro region had a population of 2,236,334 in the 2022 census. This region is the heartland of the Bambara people.

Mother tongues in Koulikoro region (2022 census)
1. Bambara (68.78%)
2. Malinke (13.08%)
3. Fula (7.41%)
4. Maraka / Soninké (4.76%)
5. Dogon (1.93%)
6. Other Malian (3.86%)
7. Other African (0.12%)
8. Other foreign (0.06%)

Religions in Koulikoro region (2022)
Religion	Percent
Islam	95.32%
Christianity	2.14%
Traditional faiths	0.74%
Other or not stated	1.80%

== Culture ==
The land of the Mandé is located in this area. It is the cradle of the Empire of Mali, and known for preserving its traditional culture, with its griots and its hunters. Like much of Mali, the area is strongly Islamized, but the practices of animists remain very present in the villages. Bambara serves as the area's most common language.

Koulikoro is famous for its traditional puppet theater, showcased in many festivals such as in the village of Diarabougou. Several musicians are natives of the region, including Salif Keita and Rokia Traoré.

== Transport and economy ==
Koulikoro is the terminus of the Dakar-Niger railway. It is also an important port on the Niger River which makes it possible to serve the towns of Ségou, Mopti, Tombouctou, and Gao. The area is served by the airport of Bamako-sénou.

Agriculture remains the dominant economic activity, although several industries are present in the district, such as the Hydroelectric dam of Sélingué, gold-bearing industries around Kangaba, and the cotton production site in Fana, Mali's second largest.

== Administrative subdivisions ==
As of 2012 the Koulikoro Region is divided into eight cercles, encompassing 29 arrondissements, 61 communes, and 1,218 villages.

The eight cercles are:

- Koulikoro Cercle
- Banamba Cercle
- Kangaba Cercle
- Kati Cercle
- Kolokani Cercle
- Nyamina Cercle
- Siby Cercle
- Néguéla Cercle

Mali's capital (Bamako) is located in the heart of the region, but forms a separate administrative entity called the Bamako Capital District; it is entirely surrounded by Kati Cercle.

== See also ==
- Regions of Mali
- Cercles of Mali
