= AMEA Power =

Dubai-based renewable energy company

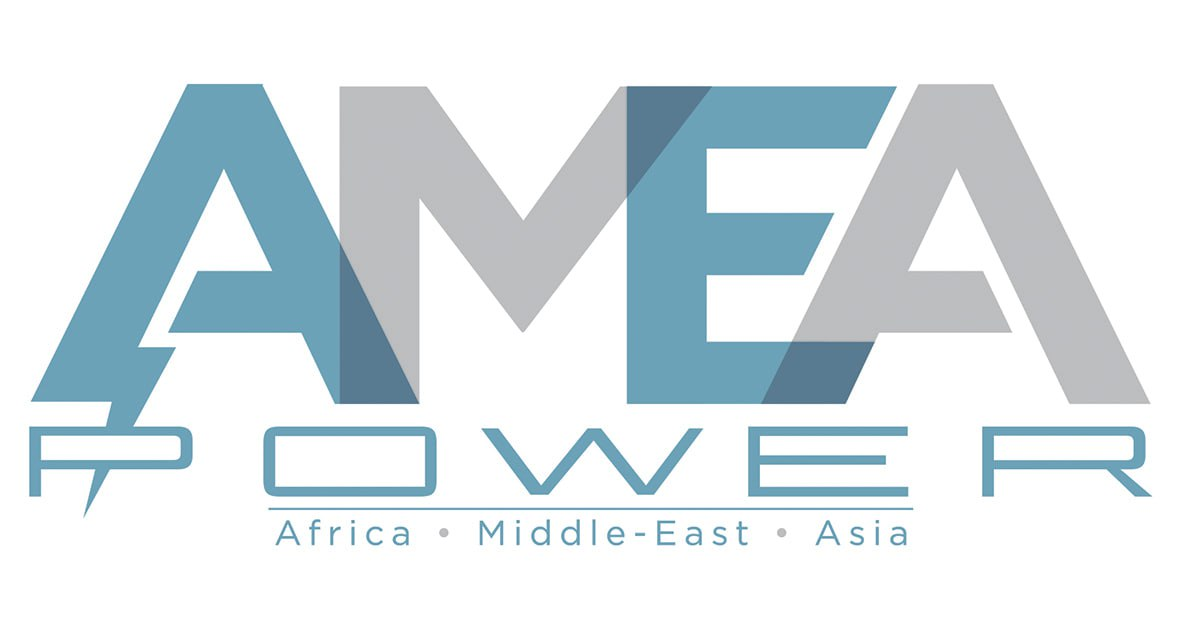
- Type: Subsidiary
- Industry: Renewable energy
- Founded: 2014
- Headquarters: Dubai, UAE
- Area served: Middle East; Asia; Africa
- Key people: Hussain Al Nowais, Chairman; Mohamed Al Nowais, Managing Director; Yousef Al Nowais, Non Executive Director
- Parent: Al Nowais Investments
- Website: ameapower.com

AMEA Power is a developer, investor, owner, and operator of renewable energy projects in the Middle East, Asia and Africa. It is based in Dubai, UAE, and is a subsidiary of Al Nowais Investments.

AMEA Power operates in more than 20 countries, with a renewable energy project pipeline exceeding 6 GW. The company has over 2,600 MW currently in operation or under construction. It was included in TIME Magazine's list of the World's Top Greentech Companies.

== Key projects ==
=== Operational ===
==== Jordan ====
In April 2019, AMEA Power collaborated with Philadelphia Solar on a 50 MW solar energy project in Jordan. The project, known as Al Husainiyah, is located in the Ma'an Governorate and involved the installation of approximately 200,000 photovoltaic (PV) solar modules, each with a capacity of 330 watts. It reached commercial operation in September 2021 and is currently operational.

In July 2021, the company, through a joint venture with Xenel Industries of Saudi Arabia, commissioned a 52 MW wind power project in Jordan. The project, located in the Tafila Governorate, reached commercial operation in the same month and is currently operational.

==== Togo ====
In June 2021, AMEA Power commissioned a 50 MW Sheikh Mohamed Bin Zayed PV solar power plant in Togo in West Africa. The plant has been operational since June 2021. In November 2022, the company announced to expand the facility to 70 MW and include a 4 MWh BESS.

==== Burkina Faso ====
In May 2024, AMEA Power commissioned the 26.6 MW Zina solar plant in Mouhoun Province, Burkina Faso. The plant is currently operational.

=== Advanced development ===
==== Chad ====
In February 2019, AMEA Power signed a Memorandum of Understanding (MoU) with the government of Chad to develop a 120 MW solar PV project near N'Djamena. The facility is planned to be built in two phases and supply electricity to the state-owned utility, Société Nationale d'Électricité (SNE).

==== Mali ====
In February 2020, AMEA Power was awarded a contract for the construction and operation of a 50 MW PV solar power plant near Tiakadougou-Dialakoro, a village close to Bamako, Mali.

==== Egypt ====
In December 2019, AMEA Power signed a power purchase agreement (PPA) with the Egyptian Electricity Transmission Company (EETC) for a 500 MW Amunet wind power project in Ras Ghareb on the Red Sea coast.

In February 2025, the company signed capacity purchase agreements with EETC to develop two battery storage facilities with a combined capacity of up to 1,500 MWh. The projects include a 1,000 MWh station at Benban in southern Egypt and a 500 MWh facility at Zafarana on the Red Sea coast.

==== South Africa ====
In April 2023, the company signed a PPA with GreenCo Power Services for the offtake of energy from an 85 MW PV solar plant in South Africa’s North West Province.

In January 2025, the company secured two BESS projects in South Africa. Located in the North West Province, the Gainfar and Boitekong projects, each with a capacity exceeding 300 MW, were awarded under Bid Window 2 of the Battery Energy Storage Independent Power Producer Procurement Programme, organized by South Africa’s Department of Electricity and Energy.

==== Uzbekistan ====
In January 2025, AMEA Power signed separate investment agreements for a 1 GW wind project and a 300 MW BESS in Karakalpakstan, Uzbekistan.

In November 2025, the company signed an agreement to develop new energy storage systems in Uzbekistan during the ENACT Majlis and ADIPEC-2025 forums on artificial intelligence and energy, held in Abu Dhabi.

==== Morocco ====
In August 2025, AMEA Power participated in the expansion of the Agadir plant in Morocco, marking its first water desalination project in North Africa. It also plans a 150 MW wind project in Laayoune, which is being co-developed with Cox.

==== Angola ====
In August 2025, the company signed a cooperation agreement with Angola's Ministry of Energy and Water to develop a seawater desalination plant. The planned facility is expected to have a capacity of 100,000 cubic meters per day and to provide water to the Mussulo Peninsula and the neighboring Futungo district, serving an estimated population of more than 800,000 people.

=== Under construction ===
==== Egypt ====
In 2019, as part of the agreement, Abydos Solar Power Company (ASPC), a wholly owned subsidiary of AMEA Power, was designated to build, own, and operate a 200 MW solar power project in the Kom Ombo region of Aswan. The International Finance Corporation, along with the Dutch Entrepreneurial Development Bank and the Japan International Cooperation Agency, financed the PV project.

In September 2024, the company was awarded two major projects in Egypt: a 1,000 MW solar plant with a 600 MWh battery energy storage system (BESS) and a 300 MWh expansion of the Abydos solar plant.

==== Togo ====
In December 2023, a MoU was signed for the expansion of the plant by 30 MW, including the addition of a BESS with a minimum capacity of 10 MWh.

==== South Africa ====
In December 2022, AMEA Power awarded the 120 MW Doornhoek solar power station through Bid Window 6 of the Renewable Energy Independent Power Producer Procurement Programme.

==== Ivory Coast ====
In January 2023, AMEA Power signed agreements for a 50 MW Bondoukou PV solar project under an independent power producer (IPP) scheme. Construction began in March 2025 in Gontougo, northeastern Ivory Coast.

== Awards and recognition ==
- 2023: Global ESG Deal of the Year at the PFI Awards for 1GW Abydos Solar and Amunet Wind in Egypt.
- 2023: ECA, DFI, IFI Deal of the Year at the Bonds, Loans and Sukuk Awards for combined solar and wind projects.
- 2024: IJGlobal Renewables Solar Deal of the Year – Africa for the Doornhoek Solar PV Plant in South Africa.
- 2025: Ranked #172 on TIME Magazine's list of the World's Top Greentech Companies.

== See also ==
- Tiakadougou–Dialakoro Solar Power Station
- Kairouan Solar Power Station
- N'Djamena Amea Solar Power Station
- Oyem Solar Power Station
