= List of power stations in Mali =

This article lists all power stations in Mali.

== Hydroelectric ==
Hydroelectric station	Community	Coordinates	Type	Capacity (MW)	Completed	Name of reservoir	River
Félou Hydroelectric Plant		14°21′04″N 11°20′53″W	Run of river	63	2014		Senegal River
Gouina Hydroelectric Plant				140	2017		Senegal River
Manantali Dam		13°11′44″N 10°25′44″W	Reservoir	200	2002	Manantali Reservoir	Bafing River
Sélingué Dam		11°38′17″N 08°13′47″W	Reservoir	44	1982	Lake Sélingué	Sankarani River
Sotuba Hydroelectric Plant	Bamako	12°38′16″N 07°55′31″W	Run of river	5.2	1960		Niger River

== Solar ==
Solar power station	Community	Coordinates	Fuel type	Capacity	Year completed	Name of owner	Notes
Diéma Solar Power Station	Diéma	14°34′16″N 09°11′35″W	Solar	100 MW	2018	Pal 4 Solar Energy	
Fana Solar Power Station	Fana	12°49′40″N 06°56′56″W	Solar	50 MW	2026 Expected	Legendre Energie	
Kita Solar Power Station	Kita	13°01′42″N 09°31′10″W	Solar	50 MW	2020	Akuo Kita Solar	
Ségou Solar Power Station	Ségou	13°36′41″N 06°21′37″W	Solar	33 MW	2024	Scatec	
Sikasso Solar Power Station	Sikasso	11°18′28″N 05°36′25″W	Solar	50 MW	2024	PowerPro	
Tiakadougou–Dialakoro Solar Power Station	Tiakadougou-Dialakoro	11°35′34″N 06°57′07″W	Solar	50 MW	TBA	Amea Power Group	
Touna Solar Power Station	Touna	13°07′15″N 05°50′03″W	Solar	93 MW	2023	Phanes Energy Mali-SA	
Sanankoroba Solar Power Station	Sanankoroba	12°23′37″N 07°56′45″W	Solar	200 MW	2025 Expected	NovaWind	

== See also ==
- List of power stations in Africa
- List of largest power stations in the world
