= Diéma Solar Power Station =

Solar power station in Mali

- Country: Mali
- Location: Diéma
- Coordinates: 14°31′31″N 09°11′19″W
- Status: Proposed
- Construction began: 2021 (Expected)
- Commission date: 2023 (Expected)
- Owner: Pal 4 Solar Energy
- Operator: Pal 4 Solar Energy

Solar farm
- Type: Flat-panel PV

Power generation
- Nameplate capacity: 100 MW (130,000 hp)

Diéma Solar Power Station is a planned 100 MW (130,000 hp) solar power plant in Mali. The privately owned power plant is expected to sell the energy produced to the national electric utility, Energie du Mali (EDM-SA), under a 25-year power purchase agreement.

== Location ==
The development would be located in the municipality of Diéma, in Diéma Cercle, in the Kayes Region of Mali. This is close to the international border with southern Mauritania, approximately 276 kilometres (171 mi), east of the city of Kayes, where the regional headquarters are located. Diéma is located about 347 kilometres (216 mi), by road, northwest of Bamako, the capital city of Mali.

== Overview ==
The power station is under development by Pal 4 Solar Energy, an independent power producer (IPP), based out of the United Arab Emirates. The power station will produce 100 megawatts of power, which EDM-SA will purchase for 25 years from the date of commissioning, according to a concession agreement, signed between Pal 4 Solar Energy and Mali's Minister of Energy and Water.

The agreement between the two parties also stipulates that in addition to the solar power station, Pal 4 Solar Energy will build high voltage transmission lines from Diéma to Bamako, where the energy will be integrated into the national electricity grid. Also a number of Malian towns will receive grid electricity for the first time, as part of this project. These communities include Nara, Nioro and Banamba.

== Ownership ==
Diema Solar Power Station is owned by the entity that is developing it, Pal 4 Solar Energy.

== Timeline ==
Once construction begins, the erection of the solar farm is expected to take 1.0 to 1.2 years to complete.

== Other considerations ==
Mali's is in the process of increasing electricity access to its population, (26 percent in 2012, 35 percent in 2016). The target is to supply 87 percent of the population, with grid electricity by 2035. In that regard, the country is increasingly turning to solar energy. Current and future solar power plants include (a) the 50 megawatts Kita Solar Power Station, which came online in 2020 (b) the 100 megawatts Diéma Solar Power Station, in the planning phase and (c) the 93 megawatts Touna Solar Power Station, expected online in late 2022.

== See also ==
- List of power stations in Mali
