= Muhammad Najib =

Indonesian politician, diplomat and academician (born 1960)

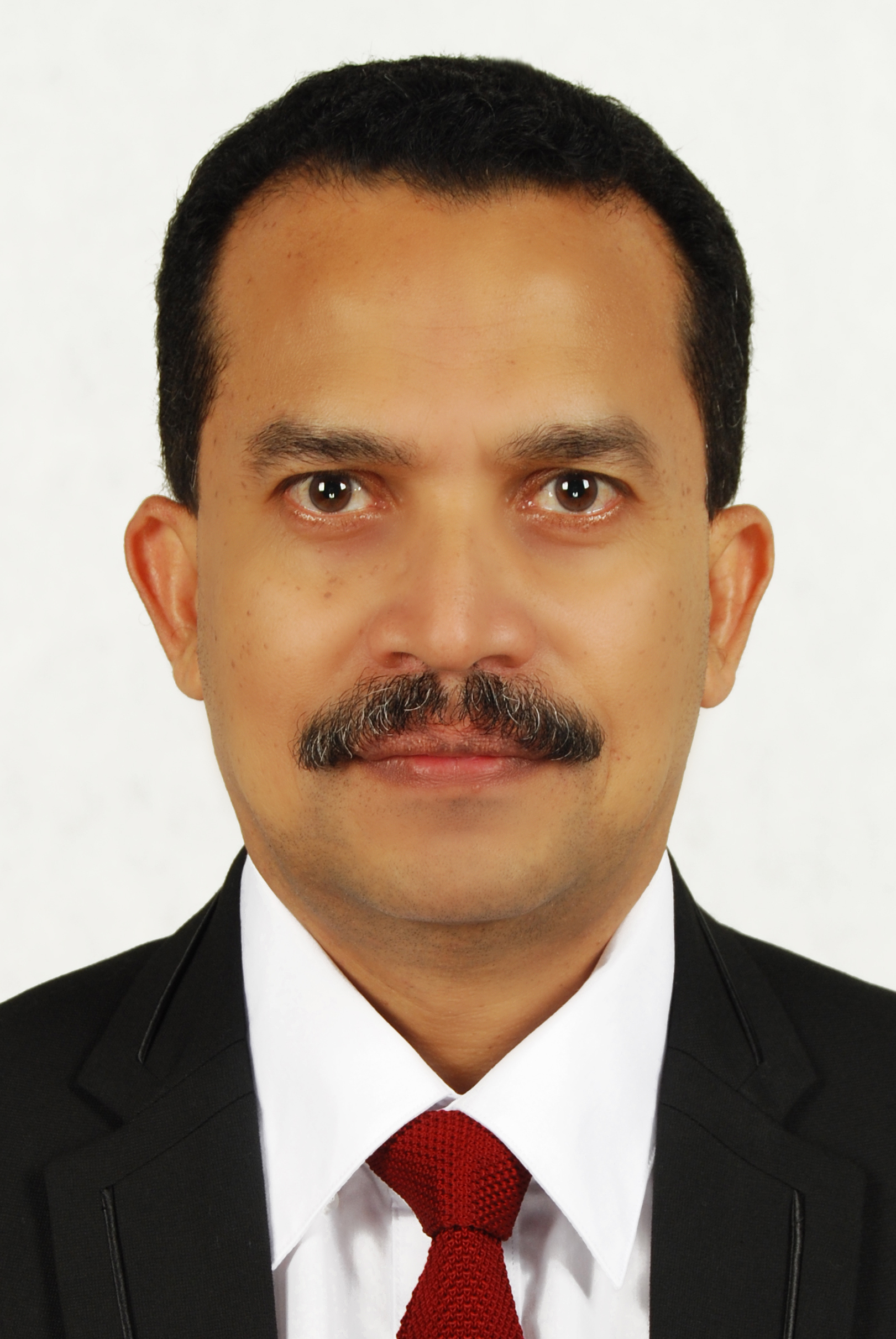

Ambassador of Indonesia to Spain
- Incumbent
- Assumed office 25 October 2021
- President: Joko Widodo; Prabowo Subianto
- Preceded by: Hermono

Member of the House of Representatives
- In office 1 October 2004 – 1 October 2014
- Constituency: East Java IX

Personal details
- Born: 9 August 1960 (age 65) Singaraja, Bali, Indonesia
- Party: National Mandate Party
- Spouse: Hafizah Syammach
- Children: 4
- Education: Sepuluh Nopember Institute of Technology; Bandung Institute of Technology; National University
- Website: mnajib.com

Muhammad Najib (born 9 August 1960) is an Indonesian politician, diplomat, and academician. He is serving as the ambassador to Spain since 2021. He co-founded the National Mandate Party (PAN) and serve on its Central Executive Board since its inception. He also held a tenure as a member of the House of Representatives from 2004 to 2014.

== Early life and education ==
Born in Singaraja, Bali, on 9 August 1960, Muhammad Najib is the second of nine siblings. His early education began at Madrasah Ibtidaiyah Islamiyah, followed by Muhammadiyah Junior High School, and he completed his high school education at Taman Pendidikan "45," all within his hometown. He later pursued higher education in Electrical Engineering, undertaking undergraduate studies at Sepuluh Nopember Institute of Technology. During his bachelor's studies, Najib joined the Muslim Students' Association.

He then obtained his master's degree in the same field from Bandung Institute of Technology or ITB Bandung. Subsequently, he earned a doctorate in political science from the postgraduate program at National University.

== Career ==
Najib began his career as an engineering lecturer at his almamater and the Muhammadiyah University of Surabaya. He also taught at the 45 Bekasi Islamic University and became the university's faculty of engineering dean. He was also active in the Muhammadiyah Youth organization, where he held leading roles in the organization's branch in Surabaya, eventually becoming the organization's secretary general from 1993 to 1997. He also joined the central executive board of Muhammadiyah as the head of its international relations department under chairman Amien Rais. During his tenure as international relations head, he visited at least twenty nations and maintained close relations with foreign diplomats.

With the fall of Suharto in 1998, Najib followed Amien Rais footsteps and co-founded the National Mandate Party. He joined the party's central executive board and became one of its deputy secretary general. In the 2004 legislative election, Najib ran as a candidate for the House of Representatives from the East Java IX electoral district, where he was elected. He received 54,704 votes, while the party received 242,166 votes in the electoral district. He was re-elected in 2009 with 26,253 votes.

During his first term in the house of representatives, Najib was a member of the Commission VII of the house of representatives, which focuses on energy, mineral resources, research, technology, and environment. He was the secretary of the PAN fraction from 2004 to 2007 and the deputy chairman from 2006 until 2009. During his time in the DPR RI, he was also active in several special committees and working groups, such as the sale of tankers belonging to Pertamina, draft bills on hajj pilgrimage organization, mineral and coal mining, and national defense reserve components, the government's proposal on fuel price hike, the Lapindo mudflow case, and the ASEAN Agreement on Transboundary Haze Pollution.

Upon serving as member of the House of Representatives, from 2015 to 2020, he served as the head of foreign affairs and diaspora at PAN's central executive board. In February 2021, Najib was nominated by President Joko Widodo as ambassador to Tunisia. After passing an assessment by the House of Representative's first commission in July 2021, he was officially installed as ambassador to Spain and the UN Tourism on 25 October 2021. He presented his credentials to King Felipe VI of Spain on 13 January 2022 and to the Secretary-General of the World Tourism Organization Zurab Pololikashvili on 17 February 2022. In an interview, Najib stated that he aimed to boost exports of core products like palm oil and seafood, promote positive campaigns for palm oil, explore collaboration in renewable energy, manufacturing, creative economy, automotive, fashion, and textiles, and encourage Spanish companies to relocate industries to Indonesia to strengthen global value chains.
