= Fana Solar Power Station =

Solar power station in Mali

- Country: Mali
- Location: Fana, Guegneka, Koulikoro Region
- Coordinates: 12°49′40″N 06°56′56″W
- Status: Proposed
- Construction cost: €92.7 million
- Owner: Fana Solar Power
- Operator: Legendre Energie

Solar farm
- Type: Flat-panel PV

Power generation
- Nameplate capacity: 50 MW (67,000 hp)

The Fana Solar Power Station is a planned 50 MW (67,000 hp) solar power plant in Mali. The power station is in the development stage, under concessional terms by the company Legendre Energy, a subsidiary of the Legendre Group, a French conglomerate, under a public private partnership arrangement.

== Location ==
The power station is located near the town of Fana, in Guegneka in Mali's Koulikoro Region. Fana lies approximately 127 kilometres (79 mi), by road, east of Bamako, the country's capital city.

== Overview ==
The power station is designed to have a 50 megawatt capacity. Its output is intended to be sold directly to the Énergie du Mali (EDM-SA), the national electricity utility monopoly company, for integration into the national grid, under a long-term power purchase agreement. In April 2021, the government of Mali, granted the special purpose vehicle company of the PPP consortium, Fana Solar Power, a 30-year window to design, fund, build and operate this 50 megawatt solar power station.

In July 2021, Legendre Energie, the owner/developer of the solar farm signed a concession contract for this project with the Malian Ministry of Energy and the Ministry of the Economy and Finance. The agreement is to last 25 years. The parties agreed to use the build-own-operate-transfer (BOOT) model for this Public–private partnership (PPP) infrastructure project.

== Construction costs ==
The construction costs for this project were reported to be €92.7 million (US$108 million). The initial agreements were signed in 2016. In 2019, it was reported that Legendre Energy had won the contract to build this power station. In April 2021, the Malian Cabinet approved the agreements between the parties, therefore allowing the project to proceed.

== Benefits ==
The energy generated by this power station is expected to increase the number of people inside Mali, who are connected to grid electricity and to reduce the country's electricity deficit.

== See also ==
- Kita Solar Power Station
- Ségou Solar Power Station
- List of power stations in Mali
