= DSPS =

DSPS may refer to:

- Defense Support Program Satellite, a system for detecting ballistic missile launch and nuclear warhead detonation.
- Delayed sleep phase disorder, a circadian rhythm disorder, formerly named DSPS
- Died without surviving issue, (Latin: d.s.p. suivre)
- D'jermaya Solar Power Station, a solar power plant in Chad

== See also ==
- DSP (disambiguation)
