= Touna Solar Power Station =

Solar power station in Mali

- Country: Mali
- Location: Touna
- Coordinates: 13°07′15″N 05°50′03″W
- Status: Proposed
- Construction began: 2021 (Expected)
- Commission date: 2023 (Expected)
- Construction cost: €106.4 million
- Owner: Phanes Energy Mali-SA
- Operator: Phanes Energy Mali-SA

Solar farm
- Type: Flat-panel PV

Power generation
- Nameplate capacity: 93 MW (125,000 hp)

Touna Solar Power Station, is a planned 93 MW (125,000 hp) solar power plant in Mali. The privately owned power plant is expected to sell the power produced to the national electric utility, Energie du Mali (EDM-SA), under a power purchase agreement, which has already been signed, as of December 2020.

== Location ==
The development would be located in the community called Touna, in Bla Cercle, in the Ségou Region of Mali. This is approximately 61 kilometres (38 mi), southeast of Ségou, the regional capital. Touna is located about 294 kilometres (183 mi), by road, northeast of Bamako, the capital city of Mali.

== Overview ==
The power station is under development by Phanes Energy Mali-SA, a subsidiary of Phanes Group of United Arab Emirates. The power station will produce 93 megawatts of power, which EDM-SA will purchase for 25 years from the date of commissioning, according to the power-purchase agreement, signed between Phanes Energy Mali-SA and EDM-SA.

This power plant will boost power supply in the country and "increase the share of renewable energy in Mali’s electricity mix". The government of Mali plans to increase the country's share of renewable energy in the national electricity mix to 25 percent by 2033.

== Ownership ==
Touna Solar Power Station is owned by the entity that is developing it, Phanes Energy Mali-SA.

== Funding ==
The cost of construction is reported to be 69.8 billion CFA francs (€106.4 million) “excluding taxes and customs duties”.

== Timeline ==
The owner/developers of the solar power station received approval of the government of Mali in November 2020. Construction is expected o take eighteen months, followed by commercial commissioning.

== Other considerations ==
In Mali's quest to increase electricity access to its population, (26 percent in 2012, 35 percent in 2016), to 87 percent by 2035, the country is increasingly turning to solar energy. Current and future solar power plants include (a) the 50 megawatts Kita Solar Power Station, which came online in 2020 (b) the 93 megawatts Touna Solar Power Station, expected online in late 2022 or early 2023 and (c) the 100 megawatts Diéma Solar Power Station, in the planning phase.

== See also ==
- List of power stations in Mali
