= Hussain Al Nowais =

Emirati businessman

- حسين جاسم النويس
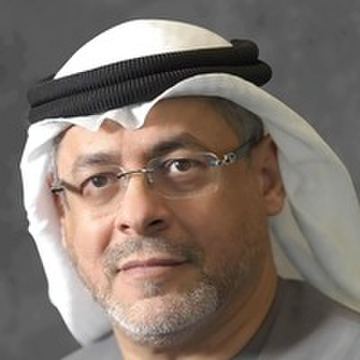
- Born: 1956 (age 69–70)
- Education: Lewis & Clark College
- Employer: Al Nowais Investments
- Title: Chairman of Al Nowais Investments and AMEA Power; and Vice Chairman of Abu Dhabi Commercial Bank

Hussain Jasim Al Nowais (Arabic: حسين جاسم النويس) is an Emirati businessman who is chairman of Al Nowais Investments and AMEA Power; and vice chairman of Abu Dhabi Commercial Bank. He is a co-founder and board member of Sandooq Al Watan and board member of Rotana Hotels.

== Early life ==
Hussain Al Nowais was born in Abu Dhabi, United Arab Emirates in 1956. He graduated from Lewis & Clark College in Portland, Oregon in 1978 with a bachelor's degree in Business Administration, with an emphasis on finance. He has attended various executive management courses at INSEAD in France and London Business School.

== Career ==
He is the chairman of Al Nowais Investments LLC, listed on the Forbes Top 100 Arab Family Businesses in the Middle East in 2020 and 2021.

He is also the chairman of AMEA Power, which develops thermal and renewable energy in Africa, the Middle East, and Asia. He is a director of Rotana Hotel Management Corporation and is vice chairman of Abu Dhabi Commercial Bank. He is a founding board member of Sandooq Al Watan (Nation's Fund) and a founding board of trustees of Khalifa University in the UAE. Al Nowais served as Chairman of Waha Capital from 2006 to 2018.

== Recognition ==
In 2013 MF International Gulf Italy magazine named him among "The people who count in Dubai." In 2011 and in 2013, Arabian Business included him in their "2013 Construction Week Power 100" list.

In June 2021, Faure Gnassingbé, President of Togo, awarded Al Nowais the Order of Mono, the highest Togolese order of chivalry, in recognition of his contributions to Togo’s development process.
