= N'Djamena Amea Solar Power Station =

Solar farm in Chad

- Country: Chad
- Location: N'Djamena
- Coordinates: 12°08′41″N 15°01′51″E
- Status: Proposed
- Commission date: 2024 Expected

Solar farm
- Type: Flat-panel PV

Power generation
- Nameplate capacity: 120 MW (160,000 hp)

The N'Djamena Amea Solar Power Station is a planned 120 MW (160,000 hp) solar power plant in Chad. This renewable energy infrastructure project will be developed by Amea Power, an independent power producer (IPP), based in Dubai, United Arab Emirates. The solar farm will be built in phases.

== Location ==
The solar farm will be located near N'Djamena, the largest city and capital of Chad.

== Overview ==
According to the United States Agency for International Development (USAID), as of May 2021, Chad's national generation capacity was 314 megawatts, nearly all of it derived from expensive "fossil fuels". At that time, the national electrification rate was 9 percent (38 percent Urban and less than 5 percent Rural).

The N'Djamena Amea Solar Power Station represents one of the first grid-ready renewable energy sources in the country. The electricity generated at this power station will be sold to Société Nationale d'Électricité du Tchad (SNE) (Chad National Electricity Company), under a long-term power purchase agreement (PPA).

== Developers ==
This power station is under development and is owned by Amea Power, an independent power producer, active in Asia, Middle East and Africa. The Amea Power Group is headquartered in Dubai, United Arab Emirates.

== See also ==
- List of power stations in Chad
- D'jermaya Solar Power Station
