= Arshad Wali Muhammad SI =

Pakistani businessman and former caretaker Minister for Tourism

Arshad Wali Muhammad is a Pakistani businessman and former caretaker Minister for Tourism, Environment, Climate Change and Coastal Development of Sindh. He was appointed to the provincial caretaker cabinet in 2023 and held the portfolio until the formation of the new provincial government in 2024. Arshad is associated with Gerry’s Group and has worked in the travel and business sectors. In 2025, he was named among the recipients of the Sitara-i-Imtiaz, a civilian honor of Pakistan. Arshad was associated with a World Tourism Day event held at Karachi’s historic Mohatta Palace on 27 September. He has also attended award ceremonies for graduates and young advocates.
