= Mali and the World Bank =

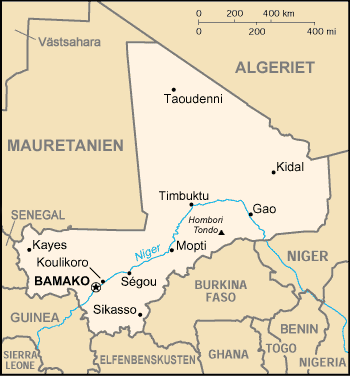
Map of Mali

Mali joined the World Bank Group in 1963 after they gained their independence from France in 1960. They are a low-income country with 41.3% of their population living under the poverty line in 2019. Additionally, Mali is a landlocked country whose economy is vulnerable to changes in climate. Thus, Mali has relationships with the International Bank for Reconstruction and Development (IBRD), International Development Association (IDA), International Finance Corporations (IFC), and the Multilateral Investment Guarantee Agency (MIGA). In 2019, the IBRD and IDA committed to lending 500 million US dollars to projects in Mali, a large jump from 2018, where only US$178 million was lent. The bank group is currently involved in 30 projects in the region.These projects focused on areas such as mining, cotton, climate change, good governance, and health. Since 2013, the World Bank Group has worked alongside their UN mission counterpart, MINUSMA (U.N. Multidimensional Integrated Stabilization Mission in Mali) to create stability and growth in the region. The current World Bank Country Director for Mali is Soukeyna Kane.

== Resource Projects ==
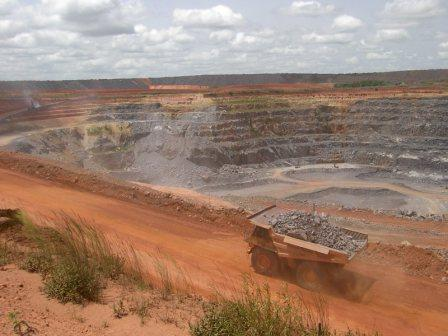
Gold Mine in Mali

=== Mining Projects ===
Since the late 1990s, Mali’s economy has mainly been focused on gold mining. Consequently, since this time the World Bank has funded projects to increase foreign investors in this sector.The IDA has funded structural and good governance projects for the mines, including a recent US$40 million in June 2019. The IFC is invested in the Sadiola mine as a shareholder. Given the World Banks involvement, the mine is required to follow certain IFC guidelines. In terms of the environmental impacts of mines, the World Bank provides required norms be followed. However they are self tested and reported by companies.

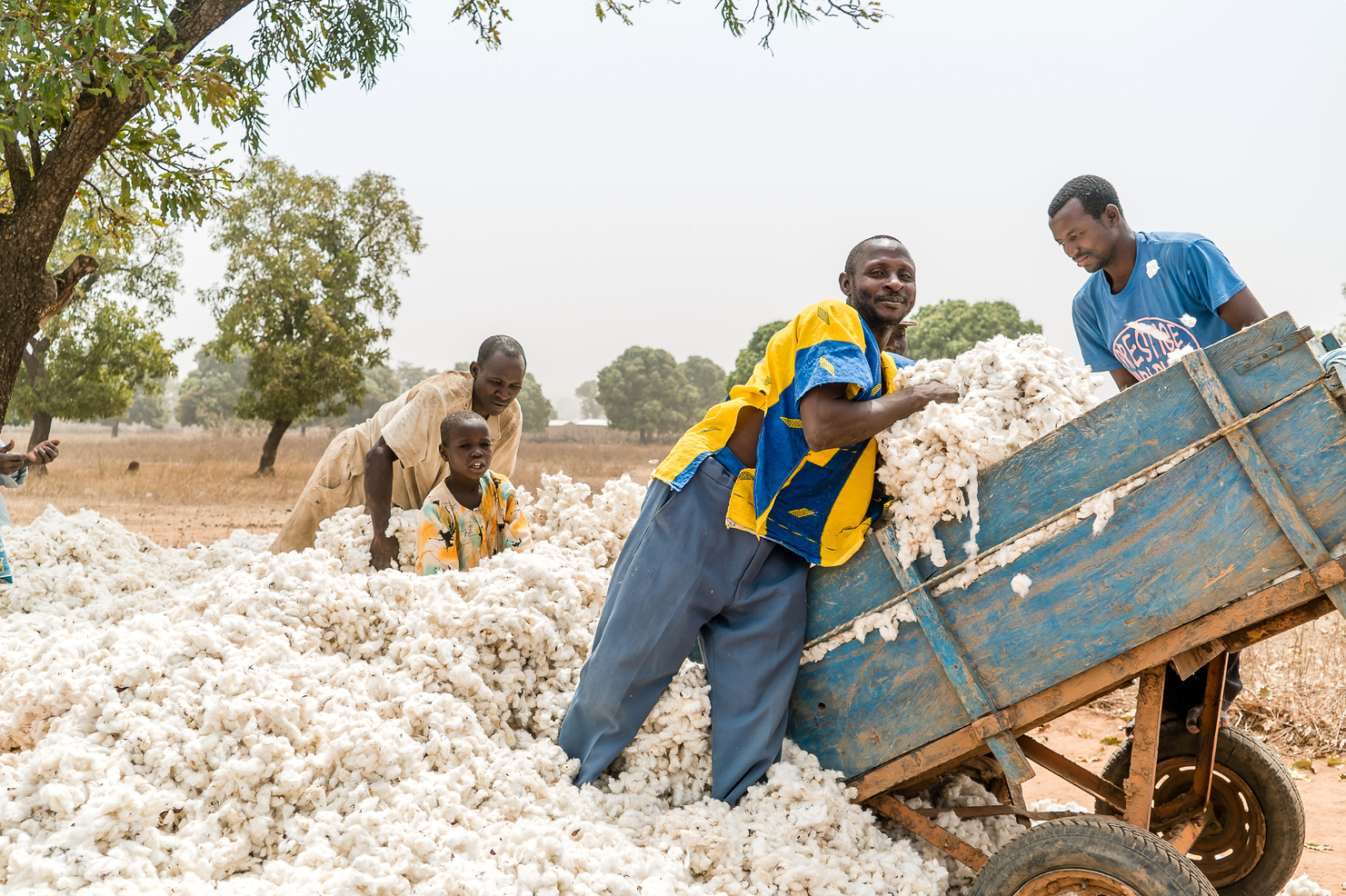
Cotton Harvesting

=== Cotton Projects ===
Before the late 1990s, Cotton was the main industry of Mali under the Mali Company for Textile Development. It was majority owned by the Malian Government and had “guaranteed prices of 210 FCFA/kg." The World Bank wanted to privatize the industry under 3-4 companies.However, Mali paused discussions until 2008. In the early 2000s, the World Bank used the withholding of US$25 million to influence cotton privatization. Additionally, World Bank environmental requirements related to fertilizers and pesticides in cotton agriculture have harmed farmers.

== Environmental Projects ==
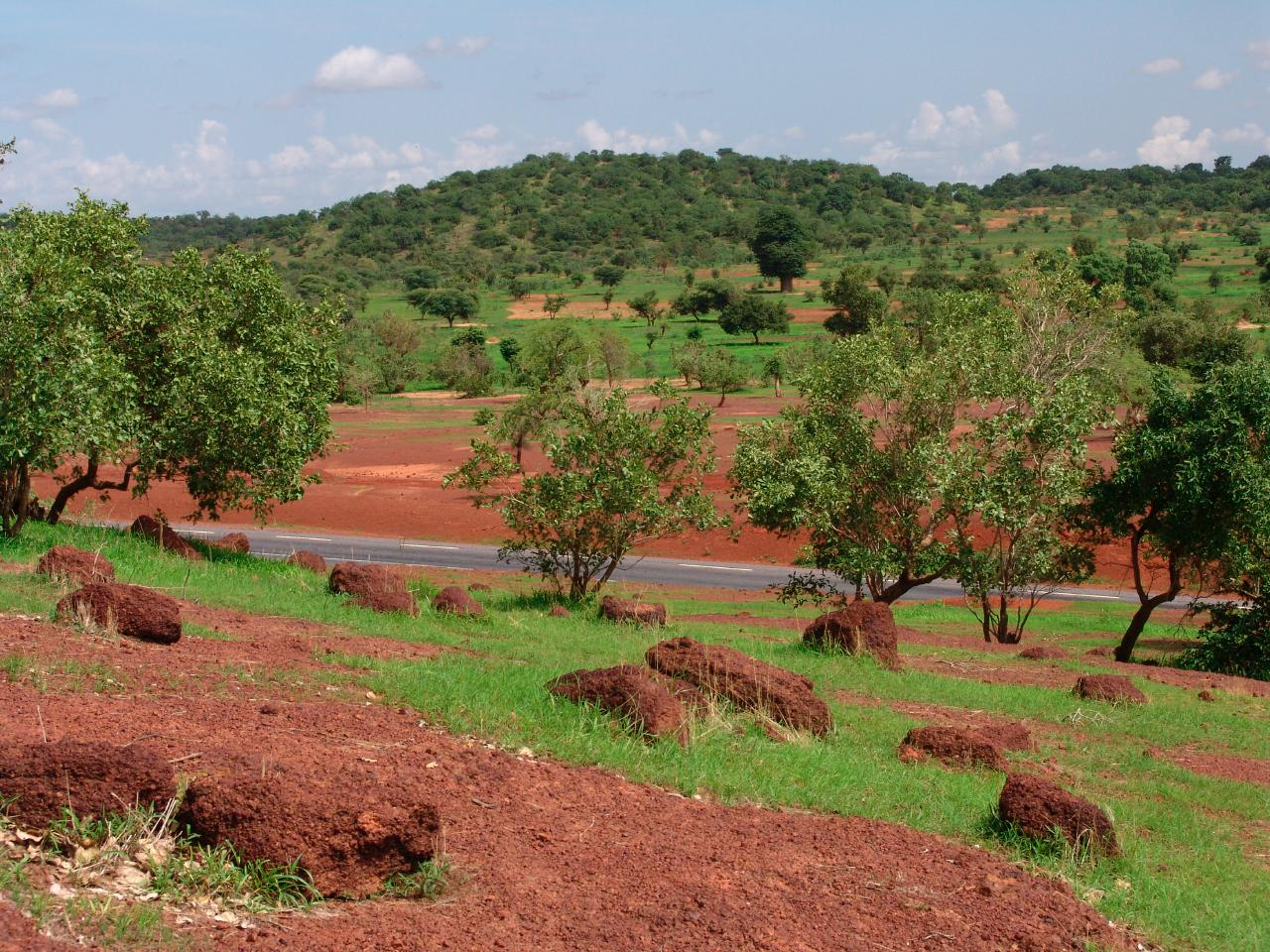
Sahel forest near Kayes Mali

Environmental regulations are often instituted as a component in other projects — such as mining or cotton projects. However, there are many cases in which the World Bank has gotten involved directly in environmental projects — especially in the realm of deforestation and mitigation of climate change.

Two Forestry Projects — one from 1979-1985 and one from 1986-1992 — were funded US$4.5 million and US$6.3 million respectively by the IDA and IBRD. These projects centered on decreasing deforestation through tax reforms, national forest reforms, and increasing fuel wood.

From 1993-2001, the National Agricultural Research Project was formed to connect agriculture research and technology to local farmers to mitigate agricultural output with declining natural resources. US$20 million was committed to this project by the IDA and IBRD.

In May 2019, the IBRD and IDA committed US$8.25 million for the Strengthening Climate Resilience Project to “improve...access to the country’s hydro-meteorological, early warning and emergency response services.”

== Good Governance Projects ==
Outside of prioritization, the World Bank has been involved in a number of good governance projects. This includes the Government Action Pan, Mali Poverty Reduction Strategic Framework, and the First Recovery and Governance Reform Support Operation. In 2014, US$63 million was given to improve transparency, public sector spending, and accountability in the government.Additionally, in the same year, the World Bank pushed Mali’s government to fire the ministers of defense, finance and investment, who were all involved in a corruption scandal. In 2019, the World Bank supported decentralization and capacity efforts with the goal of facilitating “democratization and local participation in the management of public affairs in priority sectors such as health and education.” This was done through a US$50 million grant.

== Voting Power ==
Mali is part of Cameroon's constituency. The constituency holds 3.74% of the total votes in MIGA, 4.26% of the total votes in the IDA, 1.33% of the total votes in the IFC, and 2.03% of the total votes in the IBRD. Independently, Mali's vote share is displayed in the chart below.

World Bank Organization	Total Subscription Amount	Percent of Total Subscriptions	Number of Votes	Percent of total votes
International Bank for Reconstruction and Development (IBRD)	167	0.07	2401	0.10
International Finance Corporation (IFC)	451	0.02	1266	0.05
International Development Association (IDA)	--	--	62445	0.22
Multilateral Investment Guarantee Agency (MIGA)	1.43	0.08	269	0.17
