= Ségou Solar Power Station =

Solar power station in Mali

- Country: Mali
- Location: Pélengana, Ségou Cercle, Ségou Region
- Coordinates: 13°36′41″N 06°21′37″W
- Status: Proposed
- Construction cost: €48.4 million
- Owner: Scatec
- Operator: Ségou Solaire

Solar farm
- Type: Flat-panel PV

Power generation
- Nameplate capacity: 33 MW (44,000 hp)

The Ségou Solar Power Station is a planned 33 MW (44,000 hp) solar power plant in Mali. The power station is in the development stage, under concessional terms by the company Ségou Solaire, a subsidiary of Scatec, a Norwegian conglomerate, under a public private partnership (PPP) arrangement.

== Location ==
The power station is located in Pélengana Local Council, near the town of Ségou, in Ségou Cercle in Mali's Ségou Region. Ségou lies approximately 234 kilometres (145 mi), by road, northeast of Bamako, the country's capital city.

== Specifications ==
The solar farm sits on approximately 87 hectares (215 acres) of land. It comprises 104,764 solar panels mounted on steel poles, and 10 transformer/converter boxes. The solar power plant is allocated to 50 hectares (124 acres). The photovoltaic cells that generate electricity occupy 47 hectares (116 acres) and another 2.6 hectares (6 acres) are taken up by a medical station, offices, switching station, security installation and related infrastructure.

== Overview ==
The power station is designed to have a 33 megawatt capacity. Its output is intended to be sold directly to the Énergie du Mali (EDM-SA), the national electricity utility monopoly company, for integration into the national grid, under a long-term power purchase agreement. In April 2021, the government of Mali, granted the special purpose vehicle company of the PPP consortium, Segou Solaire, permission to design, fund, build and operate this 33 megawatt solar power station.

This energy infrastructure project was first approved by the government of Mali in 2015. Since then, the delay in beginning construction has seen the price of solar hardware significantly drop. This has necessitated the revision of the contracts to recognize the changes in financing and related matters.

== Developers ==
The table below illustrates the corporate entities who own a stake in the special purpose vehicle company Segou Solaire:

Segou Solaire Stock Ownership
Rank	Name of Owner	Domicile	Notes
1	Scatec	Norway	Lead developer
2	IFC InfraVentures	United States	Development partner
3	Africa Power	Mali	Local partner

== Construction costs ==
The construction costs for this project were reported to be €48.4 million. The initial agreements were signed in 2015. In April 2021, the Malian Cabinet approved amended agreements between the parties, allowing the project to proceed. The amendments were required due to the drop in the price of solar equipment and reduction in the international price of solar electricity. Other credible sources has put the construction price at US$53.7 million.

== Funding ==
Other funding partners who do not have equity in the power station include (a) African Development Bank (b) International Finance Corporation and (c) Norwegian Agency for Development Cooperation.

== Benefits ==
The energy generated by this power station is expected to reduce the country's electricity deficit and to increase the proportion of the Malian population who are connected to grid electricity.

== See also ==
- Kita Solar Power Station
- Fana Solar Power Station
- List of power stations in Mali
