= Tiakadougou–Dialakoro Solar Power Station =

Solar farm in Mali

- Country: Mali
- Location: Tiakadougou–Dialakoro, Koulikoro Region
- Coordinates: 11°35′34″N 06°57′07″W
- Status: Proposed
- Construction cost: US$75 million
- Owner: Amea Power Group
- Operator: Amea Mali Solar

Solar farm
- Type: Flat-panel PV

Power generation
- Nameplate capacity: 50 MW (67,000 hp)

The Tiakadougou–Dialakoro Solar Power Station is a proposed 50 MW (67,000 hp) solar power plant in Mali. The power station is under development by Amea Power Group, an independent power producer (IPP), based in the United Arab Emirates. The power generated here will be integrated into the Malian national electricity grid, under a 25-year power purchase agreement.

== Location ==
The power station would be located near the village of Tiakadougou-Dialakoro, with a population of about 7,000 people, in the Koulikoro Region of Mali, southeast of Bamako, the capital and largest city in the country.

== Overview ==
The power station is under development by Amea Power Group, based in Dubai, in the United Arab Emirates. Amea Group is an independent power producer (IPP), that focuses on the "development and operation of energy projects in Africa, the Middle East and Asia".

According to agreements between the Amea Group and the government of Mali, the IPP will build, finance and operate the power station for 25 years. The government of Mali will buy that energy in accordance with the power purchase agreement signed with the developers.

== Cost ==
The development cost for this energy infrastructure project is quoted as CFA:44.6 billion (approx. US$75 million).

== Benefits ==
Anticipated benefits from this development include (a) increase the Malian generation capacity by 50 megawatts (b) increase the share of solar power in the national energy mix (c) improve the quantity and quality of the public electricity service and (d) develop local skills via provision of jobs.

== See also ==
- List of power stations in Mali
