= Shaikha Al Nowais =

7th Secretary-General of the World Tourism Organization

Shaikha Al Nuwais
- Shaikha Al Nuwais in 2026

7th Secretary-General designate of the World Tourism Organization
- Incumbent
- Assumed office 1 January 2026
- Preceded by: Zurab Pololikashvili

Personal details
- Education: Zayed University

Shaikha Al Nuwais is an Emirates-born businessperson who is the Secretary-General of UNWTO aka UN Tourism.

== Life ==
She worked at Rotana Hotels as the Corporate Vice President. She was a director of the Abu Dhabi Businesswomen Council and the Les Roches Hospitality Academy. She led the board of the Abu Dhabi Chamber's Tourism Working Group.

In 2025 she was chosen to succeed Zurab Pololikashvili as the Secretary-General of UNWTO. She became the first woman to hold this position when her name was ratified by the UN General Council. Her appointment was lauded by the UAE President Sheikh Mohammed bin Zayed Al Nahyan as a victory for the Emirates.

In October 2025 she met Rebeca Grynspan at UNCTAD16 in Geneva.
