= Sikasso Solar Power Station =

Solar farm in Mali

- Country: Mali
- Location: Sikasso, Sikasso Cercle, Sikasso Region
- Coordinates: 11°18′28″N 05°36′25″W
- Status: Proposed
- Construction began: 2022 (Expected)
- Commission date: 2024 (Expected)
- Construction cost: ~ US$87 million
- Owner: PowerPro
- Operator: PowerPro

Solar farm
- Type: Flat-panel PV

Power generation
- Nameplate capacity: 50 MW

The Sikasso Solar Power Station is a planned 50 MW solar power plant in Mali. The project which will be developed in phases, will see 29.6 megawatts developed in the first phase. The power station is under development by PowerPro, a subsidiary of the Italian engineering and construction conglomerate, Building Energy. The energy developed here will be sold to the Malian electricity distribution utility company Énergie du Mali (EDM), under a 28-year power purchase agreement.

== Location ==
The power station would be located in Sikasso Region, in the south of the country, near the city of Sikasso, the second largest city in Mali. Sikasso is located approximately 370 kilometres (230 mi), by road, southeast of Bamako, the capital and largest city in the country.

== Overview ==
The Government of Mali is developing this renewable energy infrastructure project under the Build-Operate-Own-Transfer (BOOT) model, in this public private partnership (PPP) arrangement.

A 28-year power purchase agreement has already been signed between EDM and the power station developers. This power station is expected to improve the quality of the public electricity network in the country and reduce the average cost of energy, in addition to increasing the production capacity of the "interconnected network". Mali is a member of the West African Power Pool.

== Developers ==
The power station is being developed by PowerPro, a subsidiary of Building Energy, an engineering and construction conglomerate based in Italy.

== Funding ==
In 2018, the World Bank Group, through the International Development Association, agreed to lend the government of Mali US$52 million towards the development of this power station.

== Other considerations ==
In a related development, in August 2021, the Kalpataru Power Transmission Limited (KPTL), with funding from the Exim Bank of India, started construction of the 398 kilometres (247 mi) 225 kiloVolt Bamako-Sikasso High Voltage Power Transmission Line.

== See also ==
- List of power stations in Mali
