= Al Nowais Investments =

Private investment company

- Company type: Private
- Founded: 1979; 47 years ago
- Founder: Hussain Al Nowais
- Headquarters: Abu Dhabi, United Arab Emirates
- Services: Engineering; Construction; Oilfield services; Healthcare; Communication; Real estate; Hospitality; Infrastructure
- Website: alnowais.com

Al Nowais Investments is a UAE-based investment holding company that owns and controls various subsidiary companies. It operates in the field of energy, infrastructure, healthcare, hospitality and real estate, FMCG, and technologies. Among its biggest subsidiaries are the Danway Group, Emircom, Pharmatrade, and Rotana Hotels.

== History ==
Founded in 1979 by Hussain Al Nowais, the company has evolved from a local business to a regional conglomerate in multiple markets.

In 2014, Al Nowais signed a Memorandum of Understanding with the Egyptian Electricity Holding Company to build a power plant in Oyoun Moussa, south of Sinai, Egypt.

In 2021, Al Nowais invested $1 billion in two renewable energy plants in Egypt. According to the company, it recorded revenues of around $1 billion in the same year.

== Awards ==
- Ranked #40 in the Top 100 Arab Family Businesses 2024 by Forbes Middle East
- Ranked #50 in the Top 100 Arab Family Businesses 2023 by Forbes Middle East
- Ranked #55 in the Top 100 Arab Family Businesses in the Middle East in 2021
