= D'jermaya Solar Power Station =

Solar farm in Chad

Djermaya Solar Power Station
- Djermaya Solar Power Station
- Country: Chad
- Location: Djermaya, near Ndjamena
- Coordinates: 12°23′12″N 15°02′12″E
- Status: Proposed
- Commission date: 2024 Expected
- Construction cost: €60,300,000
- Operator: D'jermaya Solar Company

Thermal power station
- Primary fuel: Solar

Power generation
- Nameplate capacity: 36 MW (48,000 hp) Expandable to 60 MW (80,000 hp)

Djermaya Solar Power Station (DSPS) is a planned 60 MW (80,000 hp) solar power plant in Chad. The solar farm is under development and is owned by a consortium comprising (a) Aldwych International Limited, a subsidiary of Anergi Group (working on behalf of InfraCo Africa) and (b) Smart Energies. The power station will be developed in phases. Phase 1, with capacity of 32 megawatts will be developed first. Phase 2, with capacity of 28 megawatts will be developed after Phase 1.

== Location ==
The power plant is located southwest of the town of Djermaya, approximately 30 kilometres (19 mi), north of N'Djamena, the capital and largest city in the country. The project site measures about 100 hectares (250 acres), in the vicinity of D'jermaya. The project site is uninhabited, prior to installation of the power station.

== Overview ==
There are three main objectives in the development of this solar farm. The first objective is to increase the grid supply of electricity in Chad. Secondly, Chad depends primarily on electricity derived from expensive fossil fuel-fired installations. DSPS diversifies generation to include green renewable energy. Thirdly, the project involves the improvement of the transmission network, by strengthening the transmission between N'Djamena and D'jermaya.

The development involves construction of a 32 megawatts solar farm. It also includes the construction of a new 18 kilometres (11 mi) 33kV transmission line from the power station to the electricity substation at Lamadji, in northern N'Djamena. Two new transformers, each rated at 33/90kV, will be installed at the substation at Lamadji. Later, the solar farm will be expanded to capacity of 60 megawatts, by the addition of 28 megawatts in new capacity.

== Ownership ==
This power station is owned by a consortium whose members are illustrated in the table below. The members of the consortium are expected to form a special purpose vehicle company, which for descriptive purposes, we will call D'jermaya Solar Company, which will operate and manage the power station.

D'jermaya Solar Company Ownership
Rank	Shareholder	Domicile	Notes
1	Aldwych International	United Kingdom	
2	Smart Energies	France	
3	Neo Themis	Morocco	

== Construction and timeline ==
In July 2020, armed with a 25-year power purchase agreement, the owners of D'jermaya Solar Company advertised for qualified contractors to bid for the engineering, procurement and construction (EPC) contract, for the first phase (32 MW).

In May 2023, the owner/developer consortium selected Elsewedy Electric of Egypt as the EPC contractor. The capacity of the first stage was increased to 36 megawatts and the design was changed to include an 8 MWh electricity storage system. Work also involves the construction of two 25 MVA (90 kV) power transformers and a 33 kV overhead transmission line to the substation at Lamadji, near Ndjamena.

== Funding ==
The project has received partial funding from the African Development Bank, the European Union–Africa Infrastructure Fund, the Emerging Africa Infrastructure Fund and Proparco. Total cost has been budgeted at €60.3 million (approx. US$70.9 million).

== See also ==
- List of power stations in Chad
- N'Djamena Amea Solar Power Station
