= Waha Capital =

- Trade name: Al Waha Capital PJSC
- Native name: الواحة كابيتال
- Company type: Public company
- Traded as: ADX: WAHA:UH
- Industry: Investment
- Founded: 1997
- Headquarters: Abu Dhabi
- Key people: Waleed Al Mokarrab Al Muhairi, Chairman, Mohamed Al Nowais, Managing Director
- Products: Asset Management, Private Investments, MENA Equities, Fixed Income, Value Fund
- Website: www.wahacapital.ae

Waha Capital is an Emirati investment company based in Abu Dhabi.

It was founded in 1997.

As of December 2019, the firm had total assets of AED 9.3 billion/ US$2.5 billion under management.

== History ==
The firm was founded by an Emirati businessman Hussain J. Al Nowais as Oasis International Leasing Company in 1997. Initially, the company operated as a leasing company of high-value assets, including aircraft, ships and infrastructure. As of 2000, the firm's shares are listed on the Abu Dhabi Securities Exchange.

== Investments ==
As the central part of the firm's investment strategy, Waha Capital is focused primarily on the MENA region’s emerging economies that are undergoing transition and set to grow. It makes direct investments commercially across a number of sectors and regional infrastructure funds.

=== Primary Investments ===
- Dunia Finance
- Anglo Arabian Healthcare
- Channel VAS
- Stanford Marine Group
- Mena Infrastructure Fund
- National Petroleum Services
- ALMARKAZ

== Structure and key personnel ==
Waha Capital is an Abu Dhabi-based investment group established in 1997 and is currently being led by its current Chairman Waleed Al Mokarrab Al Muhairi and its Managing Director Mohamed Al Nowais, as of 11 May 2023. Other notable figures include Ahmed Bin Ali Al Dhaheri and Homaid Al Shimmari The firm initially began as a leasing company, Oasis International Leasing Co. and rebranded itself in 2007 as Waha Capital to focus on the investment business.

== Major acquisitions and investments ==
- In 2019, Waha Capital divested its stake in AerCap Holdings with a net gain of Dh40 million.
- In 2015, the firm launched its second infrastructure fund with a value of $500 million.
- In 2010, acquisition of a 20% stake in NYSE listed AerCap, the stake rose to 26.3% in 2014.
- In 2014, acquisition of 90% stake of National Petroleum Services in Saudi Arabia, UAE, Qatar, Algeria, Malaysia, Brunei, India and Turkmenistan.
- In 2013, Waha Capital acquired Anglo Arabian Healthcare group, based in Abu Dhabi, Sharjah, and Ajman.
- In 2008, the firm co-sponsored $300 million MENA Infrastructure Fund I with 17.9 percent limited partner investment in it.
- In 2008, acquisition of 70% of Stanford Marine Group in Dubai.
- In 2008, the firm invested in Dunia Finance along with other investors.
