= Compagnie malienne pour le développement du textile =

Malian state-owned cotton company

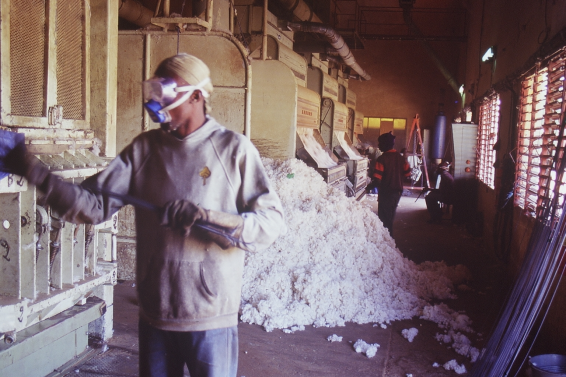
Cotton machine of the Compagnie malienne pour le développement des textiles

The Compagnie malienne pour le développement des textiles (CMDT), created in 1974, is a Malian cotton company. The company is owned by the Malian state and is charged with the production and marketing of Mali's cotton. It is based in Bamako and has several production sites through the country, in particular at Koutiala and Fana.

Partially privatized (the Compagnie française pour le développement des textiles holds a part of the shares), its total privatization was originally scheduled for 2008. This privatization, required by the International Monetary Fund is opposed by many Malian farmers. The Forum des peuples, which had a meeting in Fana in July 2005, also launched a petition demanding the abandonment of the privatization plan. As of early 2017, the company remained largely in government hands, with the Malian state owning 61% of its assets.

On June 18, 2005 the CMDT inaugurated a new factory, with a capacity of 230 tonnes per day, in Ouéléssébougou, in the industrial zone of the Office de la haute vallée du Niger (OHVN). With this new factory the total capacity of the CMDT reached 575,000 tonnes of fibre per annum.
