= Sanankoroba Solar Power Station =

Solar farm in Mali

- Country: Mali
- Location: Sanankoroba, Kati Cercle, Koulikoro Region
- Coordinates: 12°23′37″N 07°56′45″W
- Status: Under construction
- Construction began: May 2024
- Commission date: May 2025 (Expected)
- Construction cost: US$217.2 million (€200 million)
- Owner: NovaWind
- Operator: NovaWind

Solar farm
- Type: Flat-panel PV
- Site area: 314 hectares (1.21 sq mi)

Power generation
- Nameplate capacity: 200 MW (270,000 hp)

Sanankoroba Solar Power Station is a 200 MW (270,000 hp) solar power plant under construction in Mali. The power plant is in development under a public private partnership (PPP) arrangement between the government of Mali and NovaWind, a subsidiary of the Russian conglomerate Rosatom. The output of this solar farm is expected to be sold to the national electric utility, Energie du Mali (EDM-SA), for integration into the Malian national grid.

== Location ==
The development is located on a site that measures 314 hectares (780 acres) near the town of Sanankoroba, in the Kati Cercle, in the Koulikoro Region of Mali. Sanankoroba is located approximately 38 kilometres (24 mi) south of Bamako, the capital city of Mali.

== Overview ==
The power station is under development by NovaWind, a Russian-state owned company, based in Moscow. The solar photo-voltaic panels that constitute this solar farm are to be mounted on solar trackers to maximize the capture of solar radiation from the sun. An attached battery energy storage system (BESS) with capacity of 20 MWh is part of the design, to enable the power station to supply power when there is no sun. The lifespan of the infrastructure is reported to be 20 years from commercial commissioning. The agreements between the parties stipulate that all the materials used in the construction are sourced from Russia.

== Ownership ==
For the first ten years of the life of this solar firm the infrastructure will be jointly owned by the Malian government and NovaWind. It is expected that NovaWind will recover her investment during that time. The ownership will then transfer to the Malian Ministry of Energy and Water.

== Timeline ==
Construction began in May 2024 and is expected last one year.

== Other considerations ==
As of May 2024, Mali obtains 70 percent of its electricity from fossil-fuel sources. This solar farm, when completed, will be the largest solar power station in the country and in West Africa. It is expected to increase the country's electricity generation capacity by 10 percent.

== See also ==
- List of power stations in Mali
