= Vera Kobalia =

Georgian politician

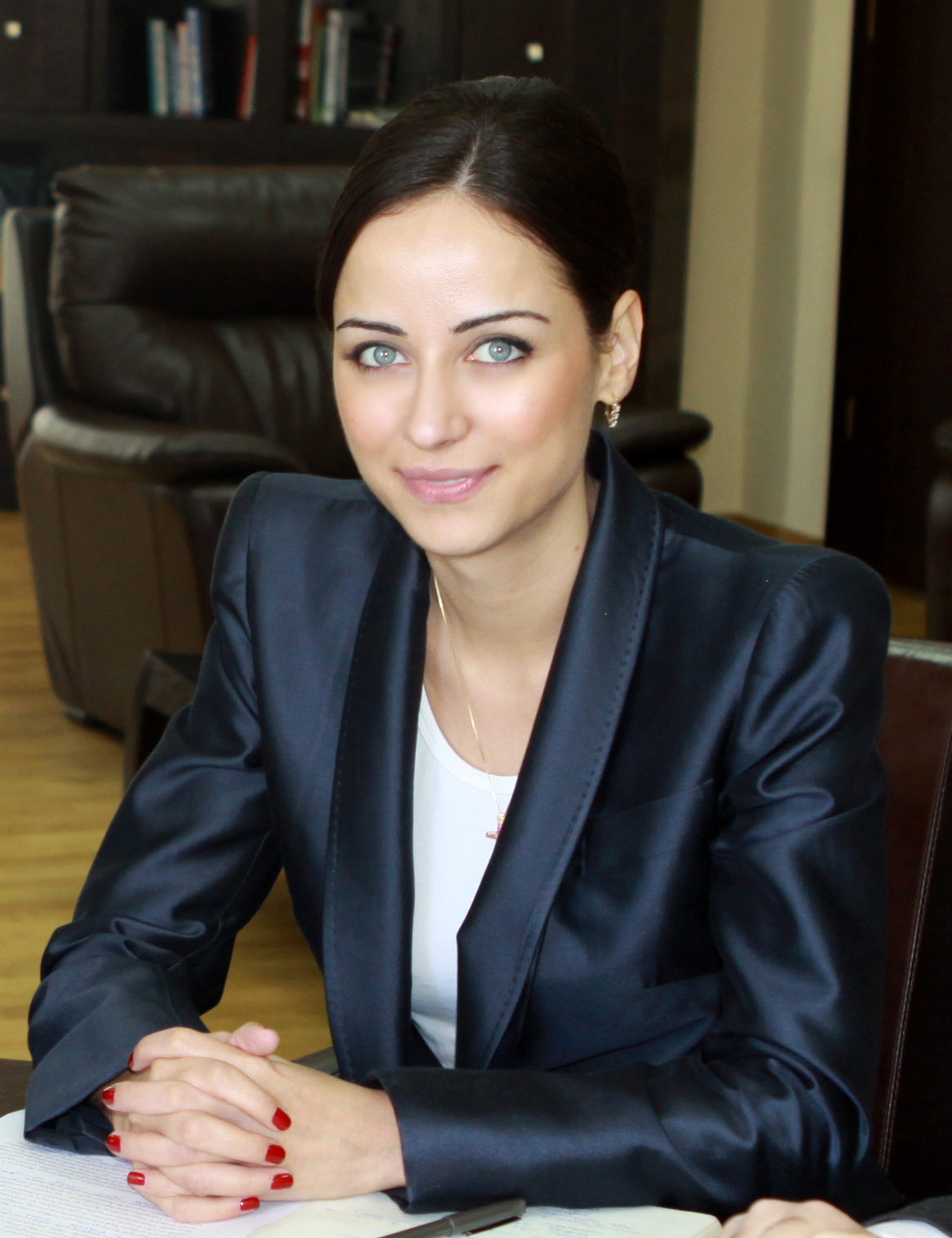

Minister of Economy and Sustainable Development
- In office 2 July 2010 – 25 October 2012
- President: Mikheil Saakashvili
- Preceded by: Zurab Pololikashvili
- Succeeded by: Giorgi Kvirikashvili

Personal details
- Born: 24 August 1981 (age 44) Sukhumi, Georgian SSR, USSR
- Website: Government of Georgia

Vera Kobalia (Georgian: ვერა ქობალია) (born 24 August 1981) is a Georgian politician who has served in the Cabinet of Georgia as the country's Minister of Economy and Sustainable Development from 2 July 2010 to 25 October 2012.

== Early life ==
Kobalia was born in 1981 in Sukhumi in the disputed Georgian region of Abkhazia. In 1996, her family emigrated to Canada because of the instability brought about by the Georgian–Abkhazian conflict. She attended King George Secondary School, and subsequently the British Columbia Institute of Technology in Burnaby, British Columbia, where in 2004 she graduated with a degree in business administration and informational technologies.

== Political career ==
Kobalia lived in Canada until late 2009 where she worked for European Breads Bakery, the Vancouver-based company started by her father in 2001, after which she moved back to Georgia. In February 2010, Kobalia co-founded the Coalition for Justice, an organization dedicated to the preservation of the rights internally displaced persons within Georgia, and to increase public awareness of the problems of Georgian IDPs around the world.

In June 2010, Kobalia was appointed by President Mikheil Saakashvili as the Minister of Economy and Sustainable Development in the Cabinet of Georgia, and her appointment was confirmed by the Parliament of Georgia on 2 July 2010. Kobalia said that agriculture and tourism would be the two biggest priority sectors of her tenure, and she vowed to reorganize her department under the slogan "no nepotism" to help purge institutional corruption in government.

Kobalia's appointment prompted skepticism because of Kobalia's young age (she was only 28 at the time of her appointment) and lack of political experience. She first came to President Saakashvili's attention four months before her appointment when a delegation of Vancouver's Georgian community met with the president while he was in town for the 2010 Winter Olympics in Vancouver. Nodar Javakhishvili, the former head of the Georgian National Bank, was quoted as saying that Kobalia had been appointed "without having either the necessary education or any experience whatsoever." Other pundits have noted that President Saakashvili, himself only 36 when he came to power, had a habit of appointing young ministers and openly claimed that pulling the younger generation into positions of power was a deliberate strategy to build a new Georgia free from the legacy of Soviet domination.

“World Economic Forum” named Minister of Economy and Sustainable Development of Georgia, Vera Kobalia as Young Global Leader 2012. Vera Kobalia is the only Georgian politician who won this award.

Kobalia lost her position after Saakashvili's United National Movement lost majority of parliamentary seats to the Georgian Dream coalition in the 1 October 2012 parliamentary election. On 25 October 2012 she was succeeded by the Georgian Dream member Giorgi Kvirikashvili.

Preceded by Zurab Pololikashvili	Minister of Economy and Sustainable Development; 2 July 2010 – 25 October 2012	Succeeded by Giorgi Kvirikashvili
