= DSP =

DSP may refer to:

== Computing ==
- Digital signal processing, a mathematical manipulation of an information signal
- Digital signal processor, a microprocessor designed for digital signal processing
- Dynamic Reconfiguration Port
- Yamaha DSP-1, a proprietary digital signal processor
- Demand-side platform, in online advertising

== Education ==
- Developmental social-pragmatic model, a developmental intervention for autistic spectrum disorders
- Direct support professional, a specialist in education of the mentally disabled
- Deutsche Schule Prag, a German international school in Prague, Czech Republic
- Deutsche Schule Paris, now the Internationale Deutsche Schule Paris, a German international school in France
- Deutsche Schule Pretoria, a German international school in Pretoria, South Africa

== Military and police ==
- Deputy Superintendent of Police, also known as DySP
- Defense Standardization Program, in the U.S. military
- Defense Support Program, operators of the U.S. Air Force's early-warning satellites
- Delaware State Police
- Disruptive solutions process, in the U.S. Air National Guard
- Special Presidential Division, a Zairean military unit

== Music ==
- Dark Sky Paradise, an album by Big Sean
- Devi Sri Prasad (born 1979), south Indian film composer, lyricist, singer, and performer
- Deathlike Silence Productions, a record label in Norway
- DSP Media, a Korean entertainment company

== Organizations ==
=== Politics ===
- Democratic Left Party (Turkey) (Demokratik Sol Parti)
- Democratic Socialist Party (Japan)
- Democratic Socialist Party (Prabodh Chandra), India
- Democratic Socialist Perspective (formerly Democratic Socialist Party), Australia
- German State Party (Deutsche Staatspartei), a political party of the Weimar Republic period
- German Socialist Party (Deutschsozialistische Partei), a far-right party founded after World War I
- Sovereign Popular Democracy (Democrazia Sovrana Popolare), a populist party in Italy

=== Other organizations ===
- Delta Sigma Phi, a social fraternity
- Delta Sigma Pi, a co-ed business fraternity

== Science and technology ==
- Disodium phosphate
- Dairy Science Park, a scientific organization in Peshawar, Pakistan
- Desmoplakin, a human gene
- Dynamin Superfamily Protein, a protein superfamily
- Diarrhetic shellfish poisoning
- Dual-specificity phosphatase
- Downstream processing

== Other uses ==
- Decessit sine prole, in genealogy, a person who died without having children
- Designated Suppliers Program, an anti-sweatshop standard used in some US universities
- Deutscher Spiele Preis, a board games award in Germany
- DSP (film), a 2022 Indian Tamil-language film
- Durgapur Steel Plant, in India
- Dark-sky preserve, areas that restrict light pollution to protect night skies
