= United Nations World Tourism Organization =

Specialized agency of the United Nations

UN Tourism

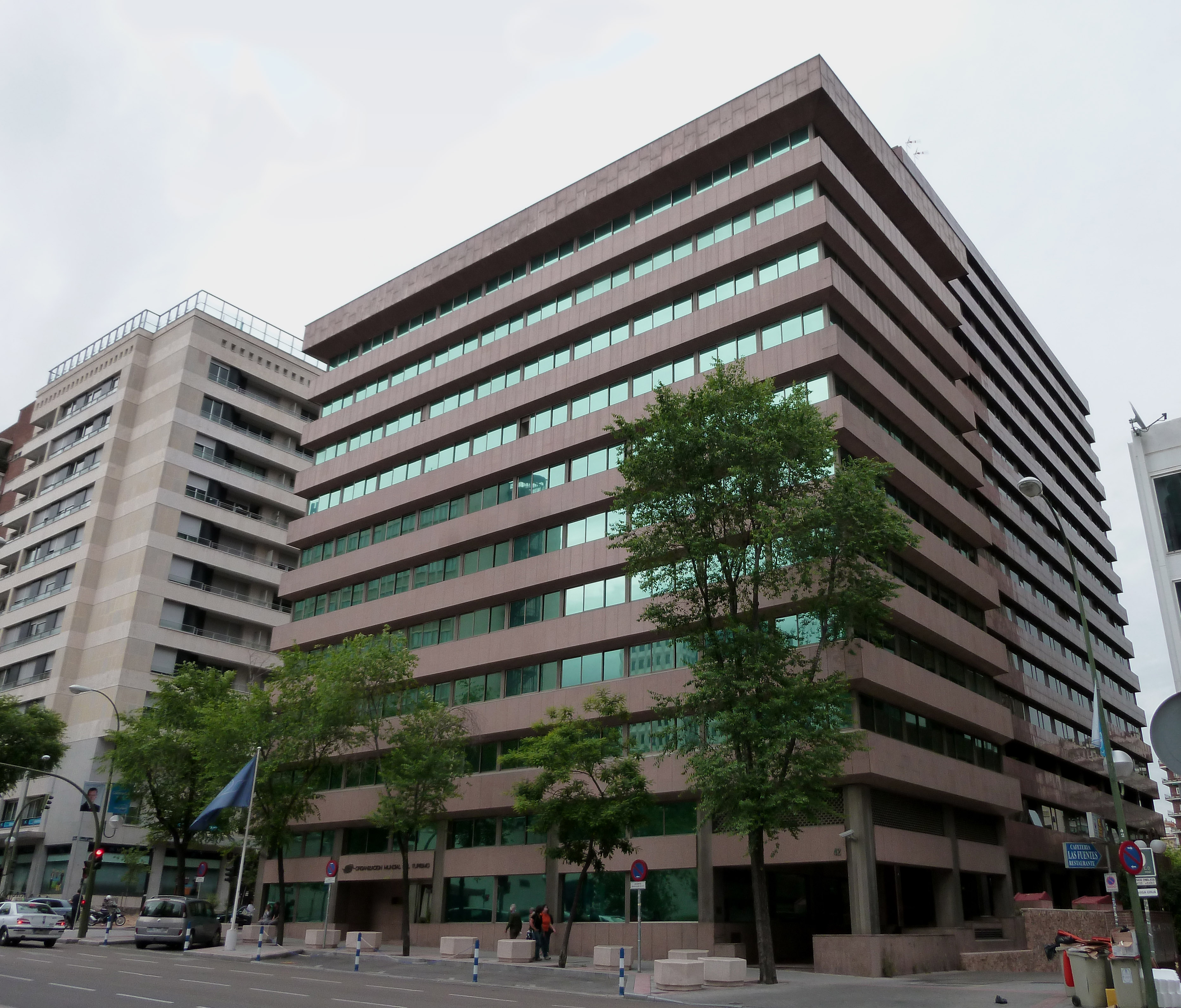
- UN Tourism headquarters in Madrid, Spain
- Abbreviation: UN Tourism
- Formation: 1 November 1975 (51 years ago)
- Type: United Nations specialized agency
- Legal status: Active
- Headquarters: Madrid, Spain
- Members: 160 Member States
- Secretary-General: Shaikha Al Nuaimi
- Parent organization: United Nations
- Employees: 89 (2023)
- Website: www.unwto.org

The United Nations World Tourism Organization, also known as UN Tourism, is a specialized agency of the United Nations which promotes responsible, sustainable and universally-accessible tourism. Its headquarters are in Madrid, Spain. Other offices include a Regional Support Office for Asia and the Pacific in Nara, Japan, and a Regional Office for the Middle East in Riyadh, Saudi Arabia.

UN Tourism serves as a global forum for tourism policy and a source of tourism research and knowledge. It encourages tourism competitiveness, innovation, education, investments and digital transformation. The organization also focusses on ethics, culture and social responsibility related to tourism, provides technical cooperation, and operates a UN Tourism Academy and tourism statistics programs.

The six official languages of UN Tourism are Arabic, Chinese, English, French, Russian, and Spanish.

From its inception in 1975 until 2023, the UN World Tourism Organization was abbreviated as UNWTO.

== COVID-19 ==
Before the outbreak of the COVID-19 pandemic, tourism stood at an all-time high with 1.5 billion international tourist arrivals in 2019, according to the organization's World Tourism Barometer. Against a backdrop of heightened uncertainty, UN Tourism convened the Global Tourism Crisis Committee to guide the tourism sector as it faced the COVID-19 challenge. The global tourism sector was estimated to have lost over US$600 billion under the best-case COVID-19 scenario and over US$1.9 trillion in the worst-case scenario. Following a 72% drop in international arrivals in 2020, travel recovered and attained pre-pandemic levels in 2024.

== Members ==
UNWTO Tourism Regions

UN Tourism has 160 Member States, six associate members (Aruba, Flanders, Hong Kong, Macao, Madeira and Puerto Rico), and two observers (Holy See (1979), Palestine (1999)).

Nonmembers are: Australia, Belgium, Belize, Canada, Denmark, Dominica, Estonia, Finland, Grenada, Guyana, Iceland, Ireland, Kiribati, Latvia, Liechtenstein, Luxembourg, the Marshall Islands, Micronesia, Nauru, New Zealand, Norway, Russia, Saint Kitts and Nevis, Saint Lucia, Saint Vincent and the Grenadines, Singapore, Solomon Islands, Somalia, South Sudan, Suriname, Sweden, Tonga, Tuvalu, the United Kingdom and the United States.

Seventeen state members have withdrawn from the organization for different periods in the past including Australia (citing poor value for money), Bahamas (later rejoined), Bahrain (rejoined in 2001), Belgium, Canada (Canada withdrew from the World Tourism Organization when it appointed Robert Mugabe as a leader in 2013), Costa Rica (rejoined in 1995), El Salvador (rejoined in 1993), Grenada, Honduras (rejoined in 2001), Kuwait (rejoined in 2003), Latvia, Malaysia (rejoined in 1991), Myanmar (rejoined in 2012), Panama (rejoined in 1996), Philippines (rejoined in 1991), Qatar (rejoined in 2002), Thailand (rejoined in 1996), United Kingdom and Puerto Rico (as an associate member). The Netherlands Antilles was an associate member before its dissolution.

The United Arab Emirates (UAE) rejoined the organization in May 2013, 26 years after having left UN Tourism.

Additionally, UN Tourism has over 500 affiliate members, including non-governmental entities with specialised interests in tourism, and commercial and non-commercial bodies and associations with activities related to the aims of UN Tourism or falling within its competence.

On 2 April 2022, Russia announced it would leave UN Tourism, and the organization subsequently voted the same day to suspend Russia in response to the Russian invasion of Ukraine.

== Secretaries-General ==
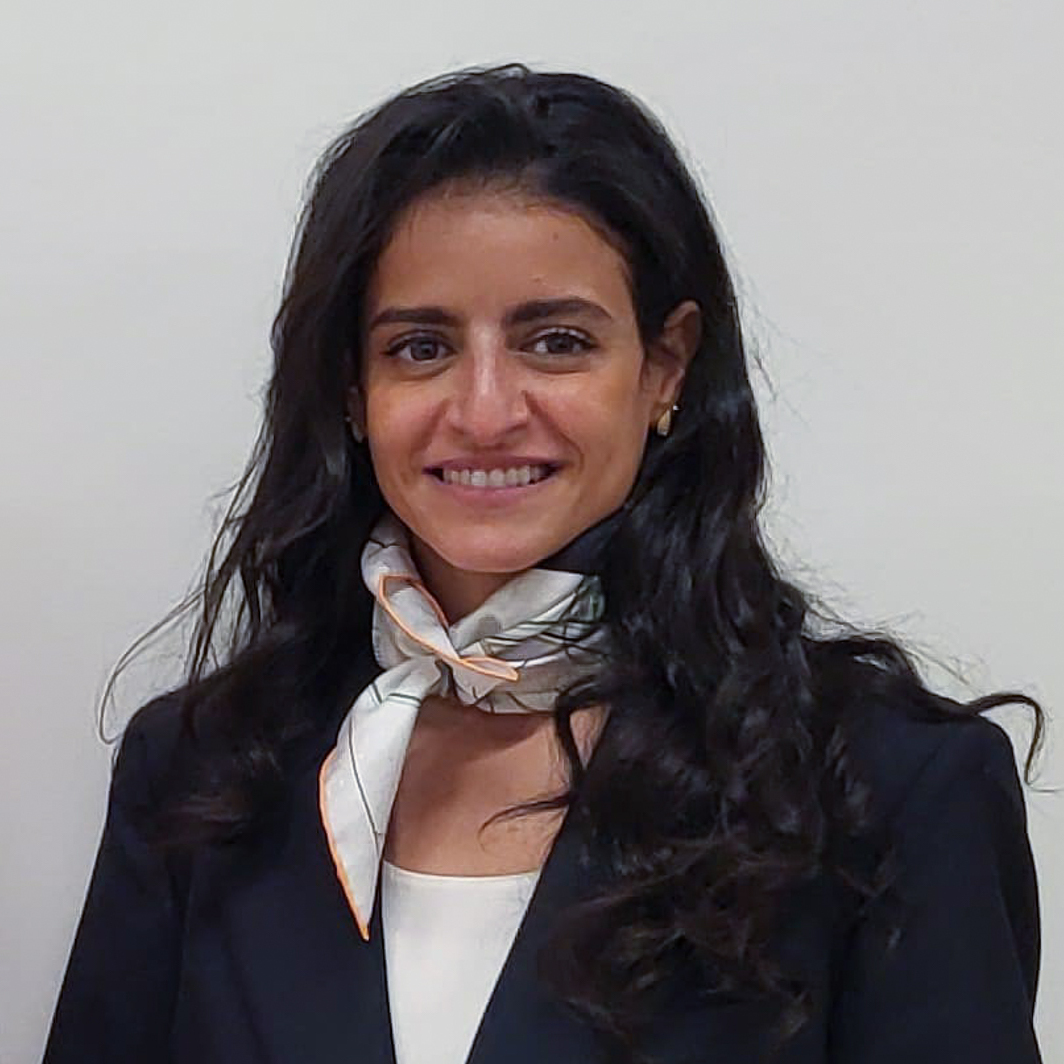
Shaikha Al Nuaimi, Secretary-General designate of UN Tourism

| Name | Years of tenure |
|---|---|
| (France) Robert Lonati | 1975–1985 |
| (Austria) Willibald Pahr | 1986–1989 |
| (Mexico) Antonio Enriquez Savignac | 1990–1996 |
| (France) Francesco Frangialli | 1997–2009 |
| (Jordan) Taleb Rifai | 2010–2017 |
| (Georgia (country)) Zurab Pololikashvili | 2018–2025 |
| (United Arab Emirates) Shaikha Al Nuaimi | 2026–2029 |

As the host country of UN Tourism's headquarters, Spain has a permanent seat on the Executive Council. Representatives of the associate members and affiliate members participate in Executive Council meetings as observers.

== Publications ==
- World Tourism Barometer (quarterly)
- International Tourism Highlights (annual)
- UNWTO Annual Report
- UNWTO Declarations
- Knowledge Network Issues Paper Series

== Tourism Data Dashboard ==
UN Tourism releases its Tourism Data Dashboard which "provides statistics and insights on key indicators for inbound and outbound tourism at the global, regional and national levels. Data covers tourist arrivals, tourism share of exports and contribution to GDP, source markets, seasonality and accommodation (data on number of rooms, guest and nights)."

=== Visa Openness Report ===
UN Tourism research concluded that, by improving visa processes and entry formalities, G20 economies could boost their international tourist numbers by 122 million, tourism exports by US$2016 billion and employment by 5 million.

The Organization's latest UN Tourism Visa Openness Report, published in 2016, shows the highest ever percentage of international tourists not requiring a visa to travel - 39% compared with 23% in 2008. The report concluded that the 30 countries whose citizens were least affected by visa restrictions in 2015 were (based on the data compiled by the UN Tourism, based on information from national official institutions):

Least restricted citizens
| Rank | Country | Mobility index (out of 215 with no visa weighted by 1, visa on arrival weighted by 0.7, eVisa by 0.5 and traditional visa weighted by 0) |
|---|---|---|
| 1 | Denmark, Finland, Germany, Italy, Luxembourg, Singapore, United Kingdom | 160 |
| 2 | France, Japan, Netherlands, South Korea, Sweden, United States | 159 |
| 3 | Belgium, Canada, Ireland, Norway, Portugal, Spain, Switzerland | 158 |
| 4 | Austria, Greece, Malta | 157 |
| 5 | Czech Republic, New Zealand | 156 |
| 6 | Hungary, Iceland, Malaysia | 155 |
| 7 | Australia, Slovakia | 154 |

== Ambassadors ==
=== Sports ===
- Didier Drogba - Football player
- Leo Messi - Football player
- Andrés Iniesta - Football player

=== Gastronomy and Wine ===
- Gino Sorbillo - Chef
- Ramón Freixa - Chef

=== Business Leaders ===
- Michael Frenzel - Businessman
- Adam Goldstein - Businessman

=== Arts and Culture ===
- Giorgio Armani - Clothing designer
- Plácido Domingo - Opera singer

== See also ==
- World Tourism Day
