= World Tourism Day =

International observance, 27 September

6 UNWTO regions

Since 1980, the United Nations World Tourism Organization has celebrated World Tourism Day as international observances on September 27. This date was chosen as on that day in 1970, the Statutes of the UNWTO were adopted. This day is also the day when the peak tourism season in the Northern Hemisphere meets the peak tourism season in the Southern Hemisphere. The adoption of these Statutes is considered a milestone in global tourism. The purpose of this day is to raise awareness on the role of tourism within the international community and to demonstrate how it affects social, cultural, political and economic values worldwide.

At its Twelfth Session in Istanbul, Turkey, in October 1997, the UNWTO General Assembly decided to designate a host country each year to act as the Organization's partner in the celebration of World Tourism Day. At its Fifteenth Session in Beijing, China, in October 2003, the Assembly decided the following geographic order to be followed for World Tourism Day celebrations: 2006 in Europe; 2007 in South Asia; 2008 in the Americas; 2009 in Africa and 2011 in the Middle East.

The late Ignatius Amaduwa Atigbi, a Nigerian national, proposed to mark September 27 of every year as World Tourism Day at a meeting of the International Union of Official Travel Organisation in Ankara, Turkey in 1971. He was finally recognized for his contribution in 2009. The colour of World Tourism Day is Blue.

== Host countries and themes ==
Year	Host country	Theme
2026	El Salvador	Digital Agenda and Artificial Intelligence to Redeem Tourism
2025	Melaka, Malaysia	Tourism and Sustainable Transformation
2024	Georgia	Tourism and Peace
2023	Saudi Arabia	Tourism and Green Investments
2022	Indonesia	«Rethinking Tourism»
2021	Ivory Coast	«Tourism for inclusive growth»
2020	Mercosur Argentina; Brazil; Paraguay; Uruguay; Chile (Member associate)	«Tourism and rural development»
2019	India	«Tourism and jobs : a better future for all»
2018	Hungary	«Tourism and the digital transformation»
2017	Qatar	«Sustainable tourism - a tool for development»
2016	Thailand	«Tourism for all – promoting universal accessibility»
2015	Burkina Faso	«1 billion tourists, 1 billion opportunities»
2014	Mexico	«Tourism and community development»
2013	Maldives	«Tourism and water: protecting our common future»
2012	Spain	«Tourism & sustainable energy : powering sustainable development»
2011	Egypt	«Tourism - linking cultures»
2010	China	«Tourism and Biodiversity»
2009	Ghana	«Tourism - celebrating diversity»
2008	Peru	«Tourism: responding to the challenge of climate change»
2007	Sri Lanka	«Tourism opens doors for women»
2006	Portugal	«Tourism Enriches»
2005	Qatar	«Travel and transport: from the imaginary of Jules Verne to the reality of the 21st century»
2004	Malaysia	«Sport and tourism: two living forces for mutual understanding, culture and the development of societies»
2003	Algeria	«Tourism: a driving force for poverty alleviation, job creation and social harmony»
2002	Costa Rica	«Ecotourism, the key to sustainable development»
2001	Iran	«Tourism: a tool for peace and dialogue among civilizations»
2000	Germany	«Technology and nature: two challenges for tourism at the dawn of the twenty-first century»
1999	Chile	«Tourism: preserving world heritage for the new millennium»
1998	Mexico	«Public-private sector partnership: the key to tourism development and promotion»
1997	-	«Tourism: a leading activity of the twenty-first century for job creation and environmental protection»
1996	-	«Tourism: a factor of tolerance and peace»
1995	-	«WTO: serving world tourism for twenty years»
1994	-	«Quality staff, quality tourism»
1993	-	«Tourism development and environmental protection: towards a lasting harmony»
1992	-	«Tourism: a factor of growing social and economic solidarity and of encounter between people»
1991	-	«Communication, information and education: powerlines of tourism development»
1990	-	«Tourism: an unrecognized industry, a service to be released»
1989	-	«The free movement of tourists creates one world»
1988	-	«Tourism: education for all»
1987	-	«Tourism for development»
1986	-	«Tourism: a vital force for world peace»
1985	-	«Youth Tourism: cultural and historical heritage for peace and friendship»
1984	-	«Tourism for international understanding, peace and cooperation»
1983	-	«Travel and holidays are a right but also a responsibility for all»
1982	-	«Pride in travel: good guests and good hosts»
1981	-	«Tourism and the quality of life»
1980	-	«Tourism's contribution to the preservation of cultural heritage and to peace and mutual understanding»
