= Rotana Hotels =

Hotel company based in Abu Dhabi, UAE

Rotana Hotel Management Corporation PJSC
- Native name: شركة روتانا لإدارة الفنادق ش.م.خ
- Type: Private
- Industry: Hospitality; Tourism
- Founded: 1992; 34 years ago in Abu Dhabi, United Arab Emirates
- Founder: Nasser Al Nowais; Selim El Zyr
- Headquarters: Abu Dhabi, United Arab Emirates
- Area served: Middle East, Africa, Balkans, Turkey
- Key people: Philip Barnes (CEO); Eddy Tannous (COO)
- Brands: Rotana; Centro; Rayhaan; Edge; Arjaan; The Residences by Rotana
- Services: Hotels; Serviced apartments
- Owners: Al Nowais Investments
- Website: rotana.com

Rotana Hotel Management Corporation PJSC (Arabic: روتانا) is an Abu Dhabi, United Arab Emirates-based hospitality company active in the Middle East, Africa, the Balkans and Turkey.

Founded in Abu Dhabi in 1992 by Emirati hotelier Nasser Al Nowais and the Lebanese Selim El Zyr, it has a portfolio of over 100 properties in 26 cities and operates six sub-brands which include Rotana Hotels & Resorts, Centro Hotels, Rayhaan Hotels & Resorts, Arjaan Hotel Apartments, Edge and The Residences. Rotana manages the Rose Rayhaan in Dubai, notable for being the world's tallest hotel between 2009 and 2013 at 333 m (1,093 ft).

== History ==
The Rotana Hotel Management Corporation was founded in 1992 and operates across the Middle East, Africa, Eastern Europe, and Turkey. The company was founded by partners Nasser Al Nowais and Selim El Zyr. Al Nowais had been instrumental in the formation of the Abu Dhabi National Hotels company.

Rotana first hotel, Beach Rotana Abu Dhabi was in Abu Dhabi.

Rimal Rotana opened in Dubai in 1996 and in the following year, Jumeirah Rotana and Al Bustan Rotana opened in Dubai and Al Rawda Arjaan by Rotana in Abu Dhabi.

By the time of the millennium Sharjah Rotana in Sharjah, UAE and Al Ain Rotana in Al Ain, UAE had opened as well as the Gefinor Rotana in Beirut, Lebanon. Rotana branched out of UAE opening properties in Lebanon and Egypt and had a total of 13 operating properties. Additional openings in Dubai, UAE, during 2000 were Rihab Rotana and Towers Rotana.

== Rotana Brands ==
Al Maha Arjaan by Rotana opened in Abu Dhabi in 2002. In the following year Al Manshar Rotana opened in Kuwait City as well as the opening of Fujairah Rotana Resort & Spa – Al Aqah Beach in Fujairah and of BurJuman Arjaan by Rotana in Dubai. Rotana engages in a brand revitalization in 2009 resulting in the unveiling of its new product brands; Arjaan by Rotana and Rayhaan Hotels and Resorts by Rotana. Opening of Arjaan by Rotana Dubai Media City and Media Rotana in Dubai, UAE. Rose Rayhaan by Rotana, a soaring 72 floor tower structure, 333 metres high opened as the world's tallest hotel and the second Centro Hotel by Rotana: Centro Barsha in Dubai.

2012

Opening of Centro Capital Centre - Abu Dhabi, UAE, Al Ghurair Rayhaan by Rotana and Al Ghurair Arjaan by Rotana in Dubai, UAE

Majestic Arjaan by Rotana opens in 2013 in Muharraq, Manama as Rotana's first hotel in Bahrain, and Karbala Rayhaan by Rotana opens in Karbala, Iraq. Hili Rayhaan opened in 2014 as the second property in Al Ain, UAE, Salalah Rotana Resort opens in Salalah as Rotana's first hotel in Oman. The Boulevard Arjaan by Rotana, the first Rotana hotel in Jordan. 2015 saw the new Burgu Arjaan by Rotana & Tango Arjaan by Rotana, Istanbul, Turkey and Capital Centre Arjaan by Rotana in Abu Dhabi, UAE. In 2016 City Centre Rotana Doha opens in Qatar, Downtown Rotana in Bahrain, Rosh Rayhaan by Rotana in Riyadh, Saudi Arabia, Centro Capital Doha opened in Qatar, Rotana Hotel Amman opens in Amman, Jordan, Centro Shaheen opens in Jeddah, Saudi Arabia and Kin Plaza Arjaan by Rotana, Kinshasa, Democratic Republic of the Congo

2017 Rotana saw the opening of Erbil Arjaan by Rotana open in Erbil, Kurdistan, Iraq, Centro Waha, Riyadh, Saudi Arabia. The next year Pearl Rotana, Abu Dhabi, Saadiyat Rotana Resort & Villas, Abu Dhabi, Al Bandar Rotana and Al Bandar Arjaan by Rotana, Dubai, Centro WestSide Istanbul and WestSide Arjaan by Rotana, Istanbul, Turkey. Centro Salama in Jeddah, Saudi Arabia and Centro Olaya in Riyadh, Saudi Arabia opened.

Rotana signed a hotel management agreement for Babylon Rotana in Baghdad, Iraq in 2019. Rotana enters Bosnia and Herzegovina with the opening of Bosmal Arjaan by Rotana in Sarajevo and Tanzania with the opening of Johari Rotana in Dar es Salaam.

Rotana opened Sedra Arjaan by Rotana on The Pearl Island, Qatar, Centro Corniche, Al Khobar in Saudi Arabia and Al Jaddaf Rotana in Dubai, UAE in 2020. Rotana opened Centro Mada Amman in Jordan in 2022, Rotana's third hotel in Amman, Slemani Rotana opens in Sulaymaniyah, Kurdistan, Iraq and Dana Rayhaan by Rotana in Dammam, Saudi Arabia. Rotana announces the launch of its newest brand: Edge by Rotana at the Arabian Travel Market (ATM) 2022. and opens 2 properties under the new brand: Arabian Park Dubai, an Edge by Rotana Hotel and Park Apartments Dubai, an Edge by Rotana Hotel in Dubai.

Rotana opened its third Edge property in Dubai, UAE: DAMAC Hills 2 Hotel, an Edge by Rotana Hotel and extended the Edge brand into Moscow, Russia with the opening of Edge Seligerskaya and Edge Vinogradovo in 2023. In the following year Rotana opened Bomonti Arjaan by Rotana in Istanbul, Türkiye as Rotana's sixth property in Istanbul, Riviera Rayhaan by Rotana opens in Doha, Qatar, Dar Rayhaan by Rotana in Al Khobar, KSA and Onyx Arjaan by Rotana and Onyx Residences by Rotana in Manama, Bahrain. Opening of Al Manakha Rotana, Rotana's first hotel in the holy city of Al Madinah, Saudi Arabia. Palma Bay Rotana Resort opens in New Alamain, Egypt, followed by the opening of Nova M Hotel, an Edge hotel in Riyadh and Beach Bay Hotel Mirfa, an Edge hotel in Al Mirfa.

In 2025 one of the group's vice President, Shaikha Al Nuaimi, was proposed and ratified as the 7th Secretary-General of UNWTO aka UN Tourism. In the same year Edge Sharm El Sheikh Sea Beach was opened in Egypt. and opened Rotana Jabal Omar Makkah, the second Rotana hotel in Makkah, KSA. Rotana's new loyalty programme developed as part of the Global Hotel Alliance. Rotana opened its first property in Syria in 2025. Queen Center Rotana Suites received the 2025 "Best Hotel Brand Award", for being the highest rated hotel brand within the GCC.

== Notable properties ==
This is a non-exhaustive list of notable Rotana Hotels & Resorts properties:

- Saadiyat Rotana
- Johari Rotana
- Erbil Rotana

=== Former Notable properties ===
- Al Bustan Rotana

== Gallery ==
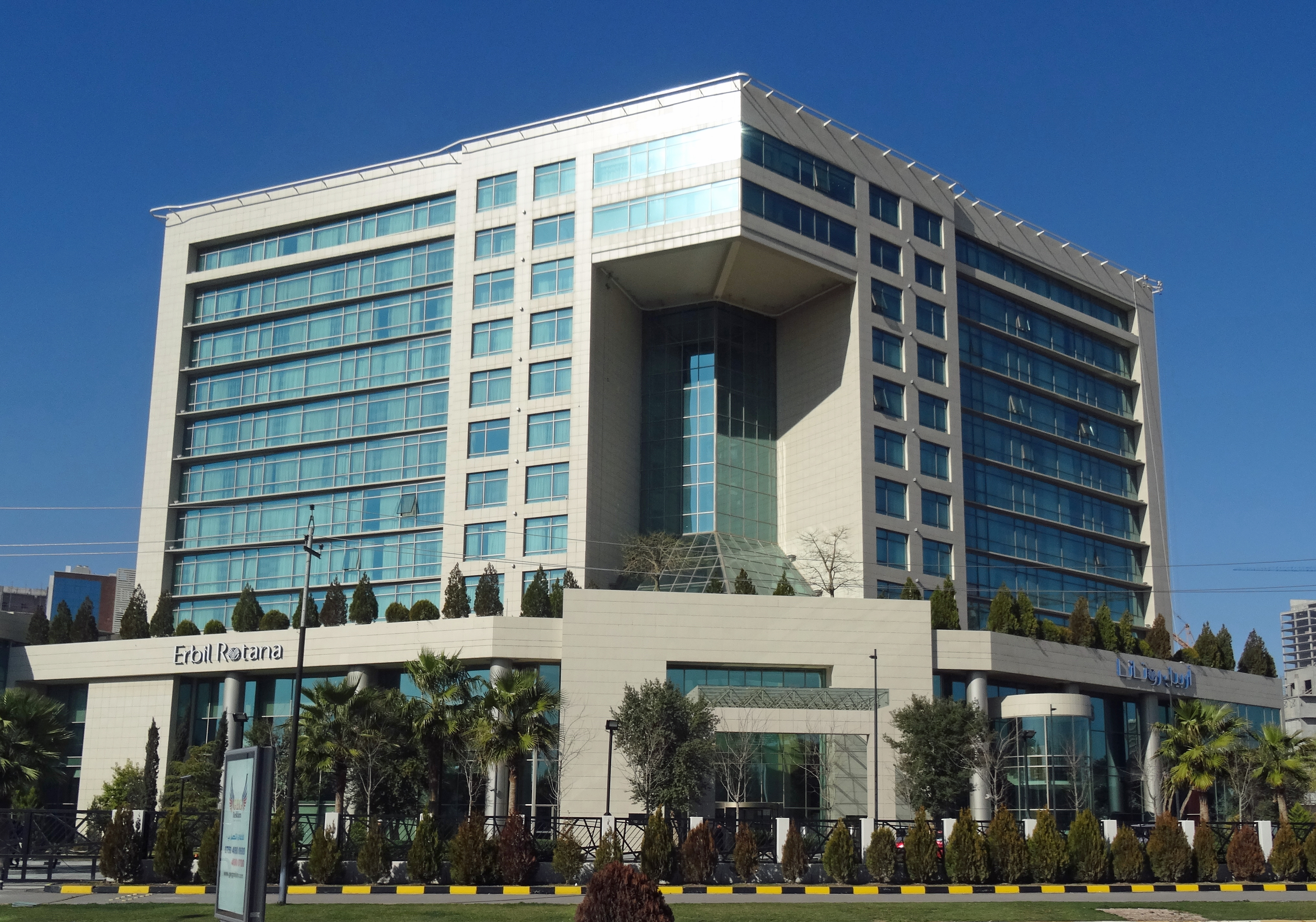
Rotana Erbil, Iraqi Kurdistan

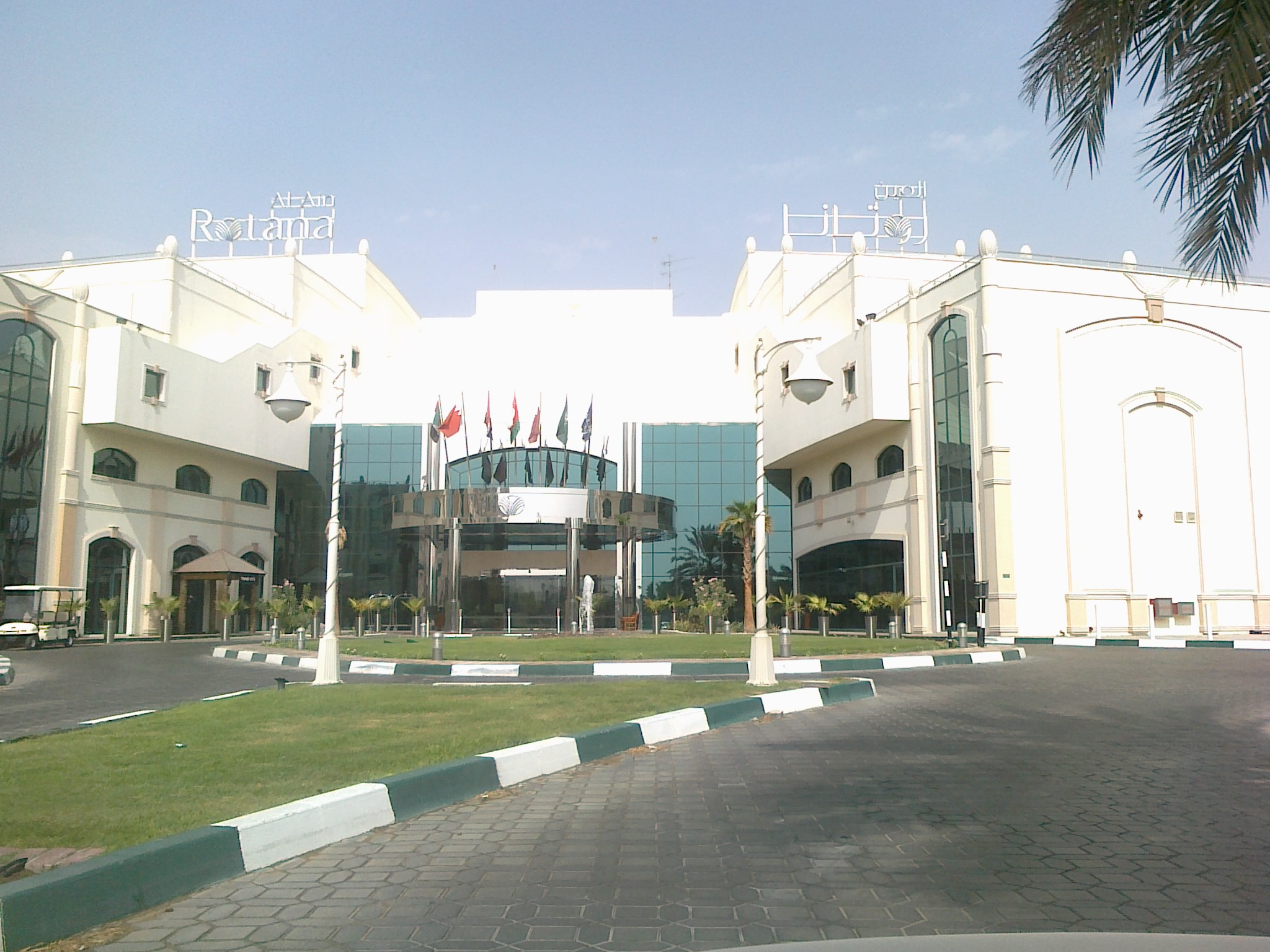
Rotana Al Ain, United Arab Emirates

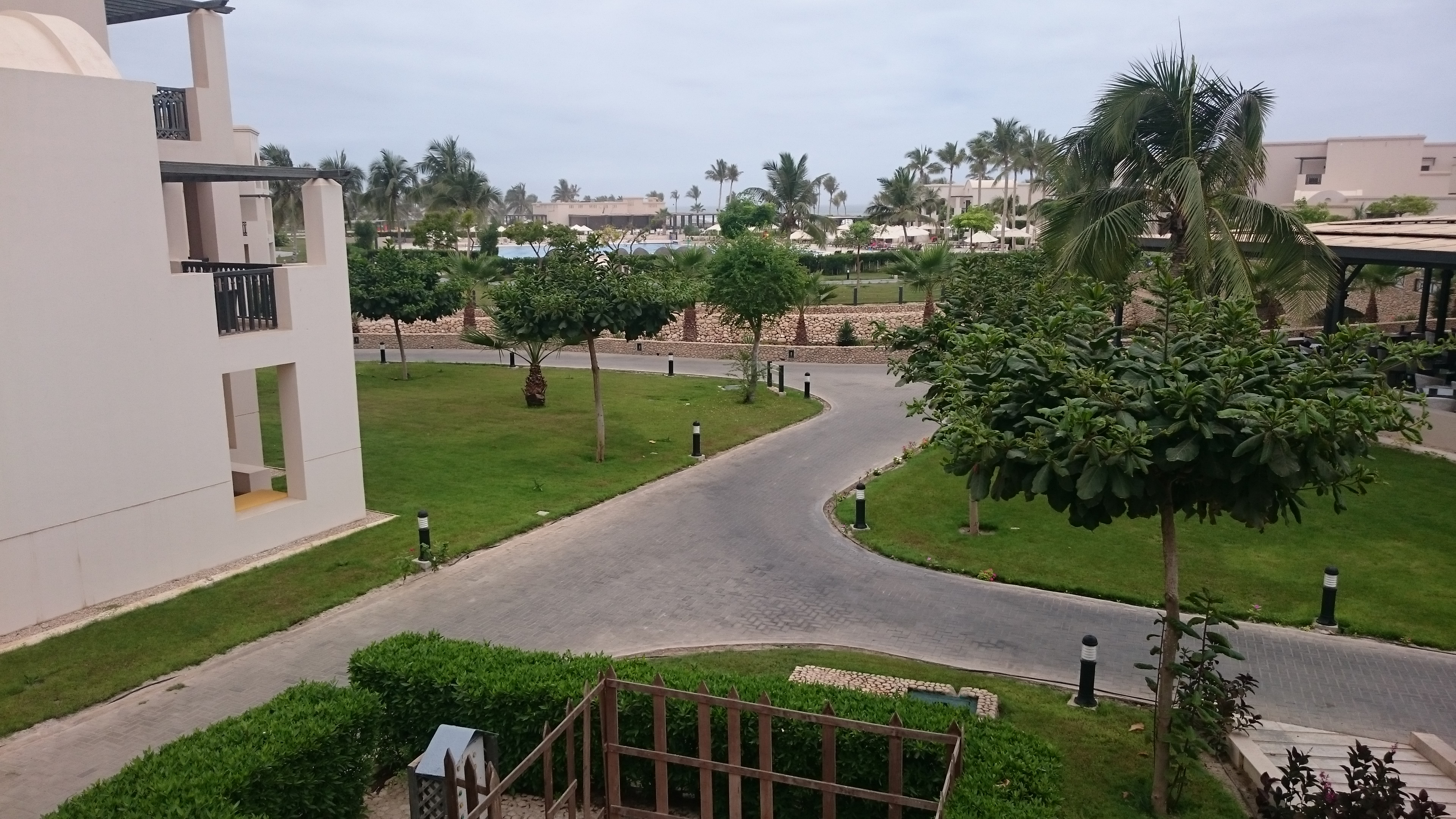
Rotana Salalah, Oman
