= Guegneka =

- Commune
- Location in Mali
- Coordinates: 12°46′N 6°34′W
- Country: Mali
- Region: Koulikoro Region
- Cercle: Dioïla Cercle

Population (1998)
  - Total: 25,631
- Time zone: UTC+0 (GMT)

Guegneka is a commune in the Cercle of Dioïla in the Koulikoro Region of south-western Mali. The principal town lies at Fana. As of 1998 the commune had a population of 25631.
