= Sanankoroba =

- Commune and town
- Location in Mali
- Coordinates: 12°23′55″N 7°56′16″W
- Country: Mali
- Region: Koulikoro Region
- Cercle: Kati Cercle

Area
  - Total: 617 km^{2} (238 sq mi)

Population (2009 census)
  - Total: 37,294
  - Density: 60.4/km^{2} (157/sq mi)
- Time zone: UTC+0 (GMT)

Sanankoroba is a small town and rural commune in the Cercle of Kati in the Koulikoro Region of southern Mali. The commune covers an area of approximately 617 square kilometers and includes the town and 25 villages. In the 2009 census the commune had a population of 37,294. The town lies 34 km south of the Malian capital, Bamako, on the Route Nationale 7 (RN7).

== See also ==
- Sanankoroba Solar Power Station
