= Kairouan Solar Power Station =

Solar farm in Tunisia

- Country: Tunisia
- Location: Metbassta, Kairouan Governorate
- Coordinates: 35°48′33″N 10°09′16″E
- Status: Under construction
- Construction began: Q4 2023 Expected
- Commission date: Q3 2025 Expected
- Construction cost: US$123.5 million
- Owner: Kairouan Solar Plant
- Operator: Kairouan Solar Plant

Solar farm
- Type: Flat-panel PV

Power generation
- Nameplate capacity: 120 MW (160,000 hp)
- Annual net output: 222 GWh

The Kairouan Power Station, also Kairouan Solar Park 3, is a 120 MW (160,000 hp) solar power plant under development in Tunisia. The power station is owned and under development by a special purpose vehicle (SPV) company, under the public private partnership (PPP) arrangement. The lead investor is Amea Power, an independent power producer (IPP), based in the United Arab Emirates.

== Location ==
The power station is located in the neighborhood called Metbassta, in Kairouan Governorate in northeastern Tunisia. This is approximately 15.5 kilometres (10 mi) northeast of Kairouan, the regional capital.

== Overview ==
The power station design calls for a ground-mounted solar project sitting on 200 hectares (490 acres). It comprises 220,416 modules, each with capacity of 545W, capable of generating 120 megawatts at maximum output. It is expected that 16 inverters will be required to energize the power station.

A power purchase agreement (PPA) has been signed by the SPV company and the off-taker, Societe Tunisienne de l'Electricite et du Gaz (STEG). The 20-year PPA governs the sale and purchase of 100 MW of electricity at $0.028 per 1kWh.

== Developers ==
The power station is under development by a joint venture SPV company which is called Kairouan Solar Plant. The shareholding in the SPV is as depicted in the table below.

Kairouan Solar Plant Shareholding
Rank	Shareholder	Domicile	Percentage	Notes
1	Amea Power	United Arab Emirates	50.0	
2	Xinjiang New Energy	China	50.0	
	Total		100.0	

== Construction costs ==
As of 5 January 2023, to total cost of construction was estimated at US$100 million. But that was for a plant with maximum output of 100 MW. By the time financial close was achieved in September 2023, the generation capacity had been increased to 120 MW. The project entered the construction phase after achieving financial close in September 2023.

The engineering, procurement and construction (EPC) contract was awarded to a joint venture between China Energy Engineering Group, Tianjin Electric Power Construction and Northwest Electric Power Design Institute. Construction is expected to commence in Q4 2023 and commercial commissioning is expected in Q3 2024.

== Funding ==
The table below illustrates the sources of funding for the Kairouan Solar Power Station.

Funding Sources For Kairouan Solar Power Station
Rank	Funder	US$ Million	Percentage	Notes
1	International Finance Corporation	86.0	69.6	Loan
2	African Development Bank	20.5	16.6	Loan
3	Sustainable Energy Fund for Africa	17.0	13.8	Loan
	Total	123.5	100.0	

== See also ==
- List of power stations in Tunisia
