= Forum des peuples =

Annual demonstration in Mali

The Forum des peuples is an annual demonstration in Mali organized since 2002 by the Coalition des alternatives africaines dettes et développement (CAD-Mali). It is a meeting of the alter-globalists of the developing countries. Created at the same time as the G8-summits, the aims of the Forum des peuples are to be a "popular space of education, of exchanges, of communication, of information, and of citizen actions". The Forum des peuples also aims to devise alternatives to Neoliberalism.

The first two demonstrations were held in Siby in 2002 and 2003. The 2004 conference was held in Kita. The 2005 demonstration was held from 6 to 9 July in Fana, a hundred kilometres from Bamako in the direction of Ségou. The 2006 edition took place in Gao.
