= Zurab Pololikashvili =

6th Secretary-General of the World Tourism Organization

- ზურაბ პოლოლიკაშვილი
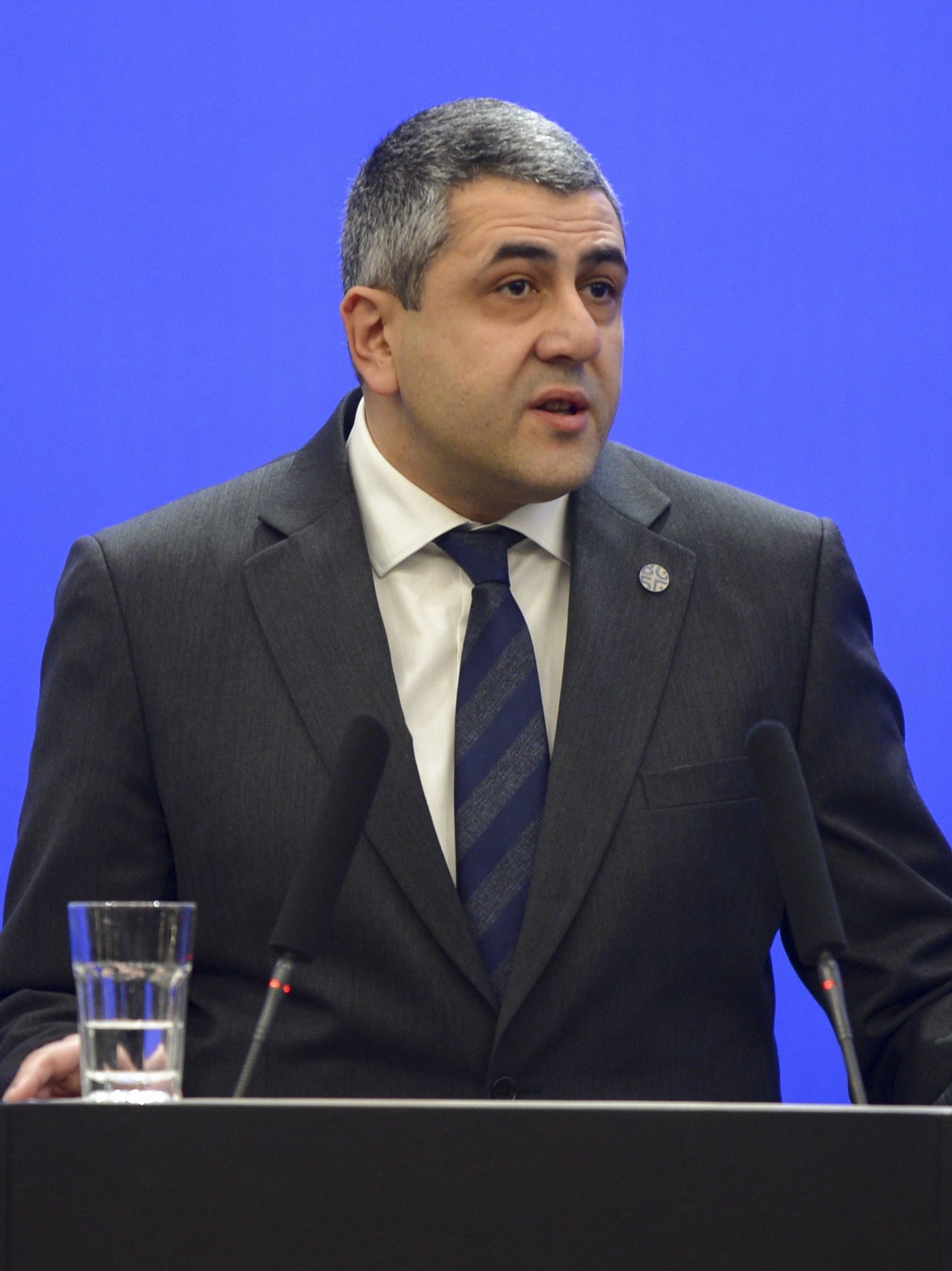

6th Secretary-General of the World Tourism Organization
- In office 1 January 2018 – 31 December 2025
- Preceded by: Taleb Rifai
- Succeeded by: Shaikha Al Nuaimi

Minister of Economic Development of Georgia
- In office 27 August 2009 – 2 July 2010
- Preceded by: Lasha Zhvania
- Succeeded by: Vera Kobalia

Personal details
- Born: 12 January 1977 Tbilisi, Georgian SSR, USSR
- Children: 3
- Education: Georgian Technical University; IE Business School

Zurab Pololikashvili (Georgian: ზურაბ პოლოლიკაშვილი; born 12 January 1977) is a Georgian politician and diplomat. He was appointed to be the Secretary-General of the World Tourism Organization and he will serve until the end of 2025. From 2005 to 2009 he was the Deputy Minister of Foreign Affairs of Georgia, and he served as ambassador to Spain, Morocco, Algeria and Andorra.

During his mandate as Secretary-General of UNWTO, Pololikashvili has advocated for tourism as a significant player in delivering sustainable solutions for people, the planet, prosperity and peace. Pololikashvili has widened the scope of UNWTOs work, including innovation, digital transformation, investment and online education, which are distinctive features of tourism as a sector spearheading new business models, people-to-people interaction, and leveraging social impact and development potential.

Pololikashvili was responsible for gathering the heads of the tourism sector, through the Global Tourism Crisis Committee, to guide the response to the COVID-19 pandemic, recommending policies for the recovery of the sector, and cooperating closely with the World Health Organization (WHO).

== Academic qualifications ==
Pololikashvili holds a Bachelor’s Degree in Banking from the Georgian Technical University in Tbilisi, Georgia (1994 – 1998). He also has a Global Senior Management Program (GSMP) from IE Business School, Instituto de Empresa, Madrid, Spain (2008 – 2009).

== Professional career ==
After graduating with a degree in banking, Pololikashvili gained extensive experience in the private sector, including with a prominent role in one of Georgia's biggest banks, serving as Manager of International Operations for TBC Bank, Director of TBC Bank's Central Branch Office (2001–2005) and Vice President of TBC Group (2010–2011) and as CEO of the country's leading football team, Dinamo Tbilisi (2001–2011).

After a year as Deputy Minister of Foreign Affairs (2005–2006), he was appointed the Ambassador Extraordinary and Plenipotentiary of Georgia to Spain (2006–2009), the Principality of Andorra, the People´s Democratic Republic of Algeria and the Kingdom of Morocco in 2006, and Permanent Representative of Georgia to the World Tourism Organization (UNWTO) up to December 2017.

In this capacity as Deputy Minister of Foreign Affairs of Georgia, he supervised the departments for administrative, budgetary, financial and consular affairs, as well as the Department for Human Resources Management. Pololikashvili was responsible for ushering in a new phase of more liberal and secure visa regimes, facilitation of processes to ease border crossing procedures, and deepening relations with various international organizations, including UNWTO.

Between 2009 and 2010, he was Minister of Economic Development of Georgia. As a Minister of Economic Development of Georgia, Pololikashvili was responsible for overseeing the country's long-term fiscal growth strategies, advancing foreign trade and investment policy initiatives as well as for promoting the development of the tourism, infrastructure and transportation sectors, establishing the tourism sector as a leading employer and contributor to national economic development.

He was instrumental in launching an innovative policy for the development of tourism in Georgia, prioritizing the sphere on both the government and private sector agendas. During Pololikashvili's tenure as Minister of Economic Development, through key policy reforms, marketing activities, improvement of infrastructure and visa liberalization initiatives, Georgia nearly doubled the number of international tourist arrivals, from 1.5 million (2009) to exceeding the 2.8 million mark by 2011. Those reforms paved the way for sustainable tourism practices in Georgia and poverty alleviation initiatives, placing Georgia among the top tourism destinations in the region. Pololikashvili successfully led the economic liberalization processes, introducing supportive policies for SMEs, and incentive programmes to attract foreign investment for the development of hard and soft infrastructure.

=== Secretary-General of UNWTO during the COVID-19 pandemic ===
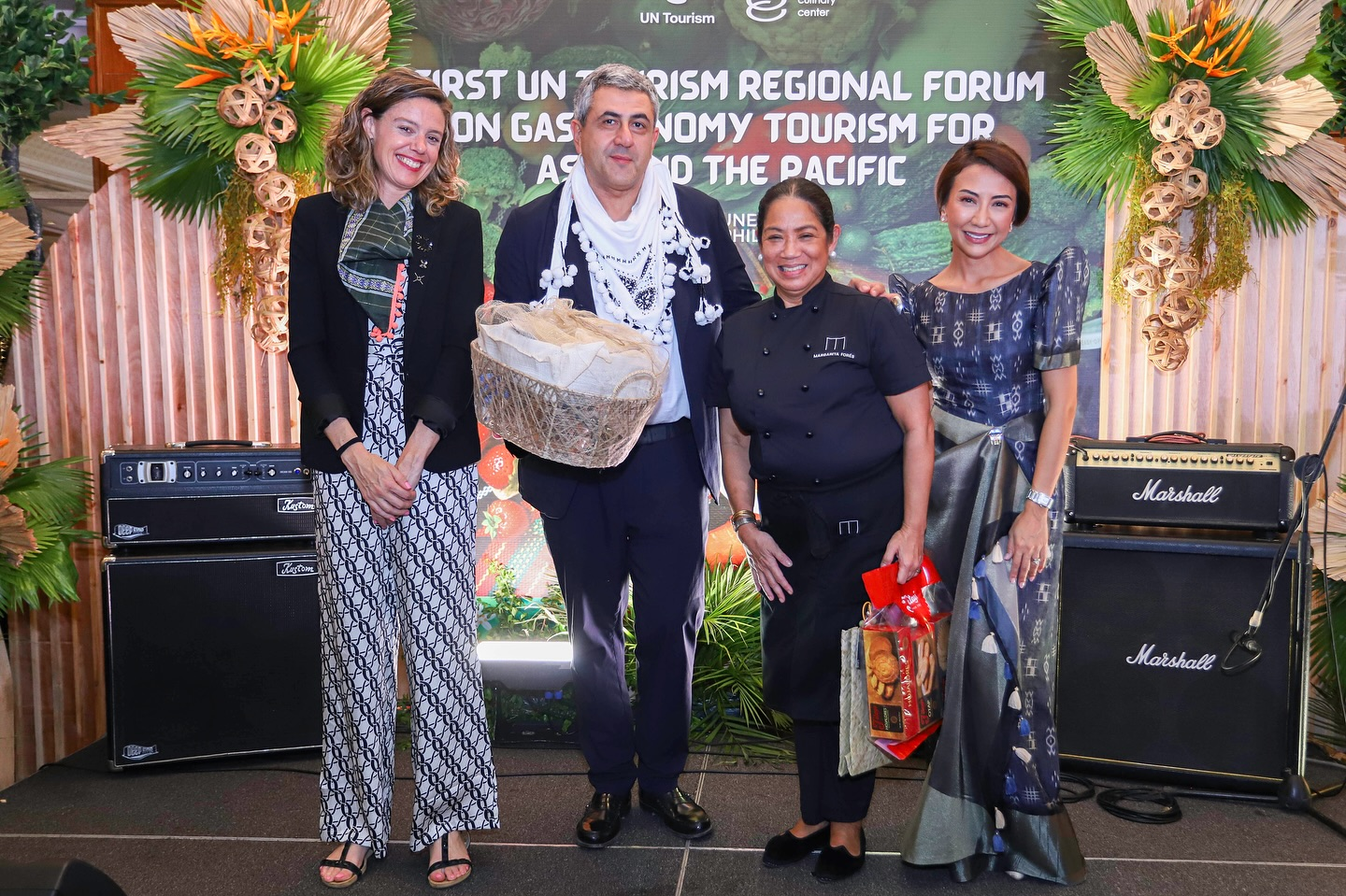
Pololikashvili (second from the left) at a UN Tourism regional forum on culinary tourism in Cebu, Philippines, June 2024

The worldwide outbreak of COVID-19 brought the world to a standstill, and tourism sector was the worst affected of all major economic sectors. As Secretary-General of UNWTO, Pololikashvili took this crisis as an opportunity to rethink tourism development. He believes that recovery must involve transforming the sector, re-inventing tourism destinations and businesses, re-building the tourism ecosystem, and innovating and investing in sustainable tourism.

Pololikashvili has guided the sector, releasing recommendations for action and giving health advice for tourists. Moreover, as a UN agency specialized on tourism, UNWTO has released frequent travel restrictions reports as well as regular analysis on the COVID-19 impact on Tourism. Pololikashvili has centered his efforts in supporting measures to restart tourism from both governments and the private sector, though partnerships and agreements, with a special focus on innovation, education and digitalization.

"I take upon me to lead UNWTO with a strong focus on building partnerships, fostering jobs and opportunities for all, mastering technology and innovation and advancing sustainability and the fight against climate change."

With a 60 to 80% decline in international tourism foreseen for 2020 and a drop of between US $910 billion and $1.2 trillion in exports, today over 100 million direct tourism jobs are at risk. Apart from this direct impact, the tourism economy is also linked to many other sectors including construction, agro-food, distribution services and transportation, all of which exacerbate the size of the shock.

COVID-19 has revealed the macroeconomic importance of tourism in most OECD and G20 economies. Many businesses across the sector are fighting to survive, with a disproportionate effect on women, young people, rural communities, indigenous peoples and informal workers–groups that are more likely to be employed in micro or small tourism businesses. This crisis is also creating an even greater hardship for low-income and developing economies, and their local communities, which disproportionately depend on tourism and hence face a serious risk of higher poverty. Under his leadership, UNWTO convened the Global Tourism Crisis Committee (GTCC), gathering the heads of the tourism sector to prepare a unified global response to the crisis and a guide towards recovery by ensuring with WHO that health measures are implemented in ways that minimize unnecessary impact on international travel and trade; by standing in solidarity with the affected countries; and by emphasizing tourism's proven resilience and by standing ready to support recovery. The UNWTO-led Committee has held regular virtual meetings, reflecting the need for coordinated and efficient action by the private and public sectors, governments, international financing institutions, and the United Nations, with agencies such as the World Health Organization (WHO), the International Civil Aviation Organization (ICAO) and the International Maritime Organization (IMO); Among the private sector were representatives from IFEMA, the International Air Transport Association (IATA), Cruise Lines International Association (CLIA), the Airports Council International (ACI), and the World Travel & Tourism Council (WTTC).

He will be succeeded on 1 January 2026 by Shaikha Al Nuaimi. She will be the first woman to hold the role.

== Awards and recognition ==
In June 2022, Pololikashvili was recognized by the International Hospitality Institute on the Global 100 in Hospitality, as one of the 100 Most Powerful People in Global Hospitality.
