= List of power stations in Chad =

This article lists all power stations in Chad.

== Thermal ==
Thermal power station	Community	Coordinates	Fuel type	Capacity	Year completed	Owner
N'Djamena Thermal Power Station	N'Djamena		Diesel fuel	22 MW		Societe Tchadienne d'Eau et d'Electricite (STEE)
Kome Thermal Power Station	Kome		Diesel fuel	120 MW		ExxonMobil

== See also ==
- List of power stations in Africa
- List of largest power stations in the world
- Energy in Chad
