= Kita Solar Power Station =

Solar power station in Mali

- Official name: Centrale solaire de Kita
- Country: Mali
- Location: Kita
- Coordinates: 13°01′42″N 09°31′10″W
- Status: Operational
- Construction began: February 2019
- Commission date: April 2020
- Owners: Akuo Energy & Pash Global
- Operator: Akuo Kita Solar

Solar farm
- Type: Flat-panel PV
- Site area: 100 hectares (250 acres)

Power generation
- Units operational: 187,000
- Nameplate capacity: 50 MW (67,000 hp)

Kita Solar Power Station (French: Centrale solaire de Kita) is a 50 MW (67,000 hp) solar power plant in Mali. At the time of its commissioning, in April 2020, it was the largest, grid-connected solar power station in West Africa.

== Location ==
The development sits on 100 hectares (250 acres) of real estate. The power station is in town of Kita, Kayes Region, approximately 188 kilometres (117 mi), by road, northwest of Bamako, the capital city of Mali, along the Bamako–Kéniéba Highway. Kita is located about 243 kilometres (151 mi), by road, northeast of the town of Kéniéba, at the international border with Senegal. The geographical coordinates of Kita Solar Power Station are: 13°01'42.0"N 9°31'10.0"W (Latitude:13.028333; Longitude:-9.519444).

== Overview ==
The power station is a joint venture between Akuo Energy, an independent energy producer, based in France, and Pash Global, an energy and infrastructure development company focused on the Global South. Together, they own Akuo Kita Solar, the special purpose vehicle company that owns and operates the power station. The power generated is purchased by the Malian public electric utility company, Electricité du Mali, pursuant to a 30-year power purchase agreement.

Kita Solar Power Station is capable of supplying electric energy for up to 120,000 households in Mali. In addition, it helps the country to save the emission of up to 52,000 tonnes of carbon dioxide every year.

== Ownership ==
The table below illustrates the ownership of Kita Solar Power Station and of Akuo Kita Solar, the special purpose vehicle company that operates the power station.

Akuo Kita Solar Stock Ownership
Rank	Name of Owner	Percentage Ownership
1	Akuo Energy	50.1
2	Pash Global	49.9
	Total	100.00

== Funding ==
The cost of construction is reported to be 53 billion CFA francs (€80.7 million). Lenders to the project included: 1. West African Development Bank 2. Emerging Africa Infrastructure Fund 3. FMO (Netherlands) 4. National Agricultural Development Bank of Mali 5. Green Africa Power and 6. GuarantCo.

== See also ==
- Fana Solar Power Station
- Ségou Solar Power Station
- List of power stations in Mali
