= Touna =

- Commune and town
- Motto: UTF-8 2
- Location in Mali
- Coordinates: 13°7′N 5°50′W
- Country: Mali
- Region: Ségou Region
- Cercle: Bla Cercle

Population (1998)
  - Total: 20,238
- Time zone: UTC+0 (GMT)

Touna is a small town and commune in the Cercle of Bla in the Ségou Region of southern-central Mali. As of 1998 the commune had a population of 20,238.

== History ==
Touna was one of the headquarters of the Bambara resistance to the Toucouleur Empire. Warlords Kegue Mari (1862-70) and Nyenemba (1870-78) were both based in the area. Resistance continued after the fall of Segou to the French in 1890. In February 1891, Lieutenant Hourst had led a small column against Touna.
