= Fana, Mali =

Fana
- Commune and town
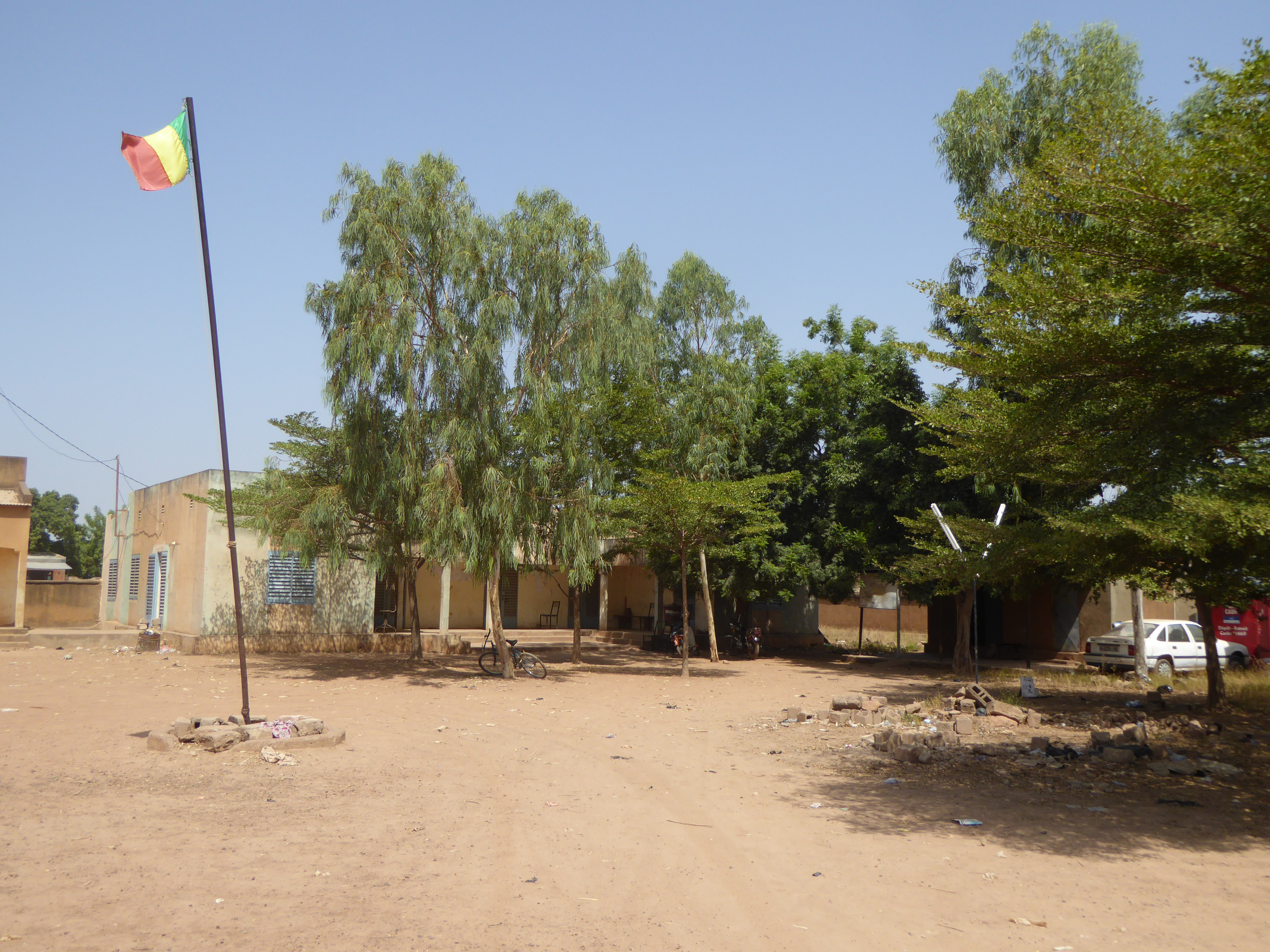

- Location in Mali
- Coordinates: 12°46′N 6°34′W
- Country: Mali
- Region: Koulikoro Region
- Cercle: Dioila Cercle
- Commune: Guegneka

Population (1998)
  - Total: 10,268
- Time zone: UTC+0 (GMT)

Fana is a town and seat of the commune of Guegneka in Mali's Koulikoro Region. Fana has a population of approximately 25,631 inhabitants.

Boasting a major production site of the Compagnie malienne pour le développement du textile (CMDT), Fana is Mali's second greatest site of cotton production after Koutiala.

Fana accommodated the 4th edition of the Forum des peuples in 2005.

== Sister cities ==
Fana is twinned with:

- Amboise, France

== See also ==
- Fana for the Norwegian borough of the same name.
