= Tiakadougou-Dialakoro =

- Commune and village
- Location in Mali
- Coordinates: 11°42′52″N 8°9′34″W
- Country: Mali
- Region: Koulikoro Region
- Cercle: Kati Cercle

Area
  - Total: 327 km^{2} (126 sq mi)

Population (2009 census)
  - Total: 6,738
  - Density: 20.6/km^{2} (53.4/sq mi)
- Time zone: UTC+0 (GMT)

Tiakadougou-Dialakoro is a village and rural commune in the Cercle of Kati in the Koulikoro Region of south-western Mali. The commune covers an area of 327 square kilometers and includes 9 villages. In the 2009 census it had a population of 6,738.
