= Chalanbeel Horse Race =

Horse race in Bangladesh

The Chalanbil's Horse Races are annual horse races that take place in the Chalan Beel region of Pabna, Natore, Sirajganj, Bogra, and Naogaon district, in Bangladesh.

== History ==
Although there is no record of when the festivals actually started in this region, locals organize it regularly in Baishakh. People of Chalan Beel organize the traditional horse race competitions every year at Notabaria village of Chatmohar Upazila. Horse owners from different districts of Chalanbill region participate in the race every year.

The races were themselves patronized by the Zamindars of Natore, mainly the Dighapatia Raj family. It is a matter of tradition for the local people. "It is the inherited pride of my family that I, my father and grandfather participated in horse race competitions. I hope my next generation will keep the tradition alive." racers say.

=== Event ===
The horse race competition is three days long. A fair is also organized at neighboring Notabaria field marking the traditional festival. Over a hundred shops were set up in the village fair. The competition was held in two categories:

- Sprint race using leg combination (called Mill Dour in local language) and
- Hurdle race of horses (called Dhap Dour).

== See also ==
- List of horse breeds
