= Boron (disambiguation) =

Boron is a chemical element with symbol B and atomic number 5.

Boron may also refer to:

- Boron (surname)
- Boron, California, a census-designated place in the United States
  - Boron Air Force Station
- Boron, Ivory Coast, a town
- Boron, Mali, a town and commune
- Boron, Territoire de Belfort, a commune département in France
- Boron Oil, a subsidiary and brand of Standard Oil of Ohio, acquired by BP
- Bodhu Boron, an Indian wedding ritual
- Boron (TV series), an Indian Bengali-language TV series
- Isotopes of boron

== See also ==
- B (disambiguation)
