= Henna ceremony =

Wedding tradition

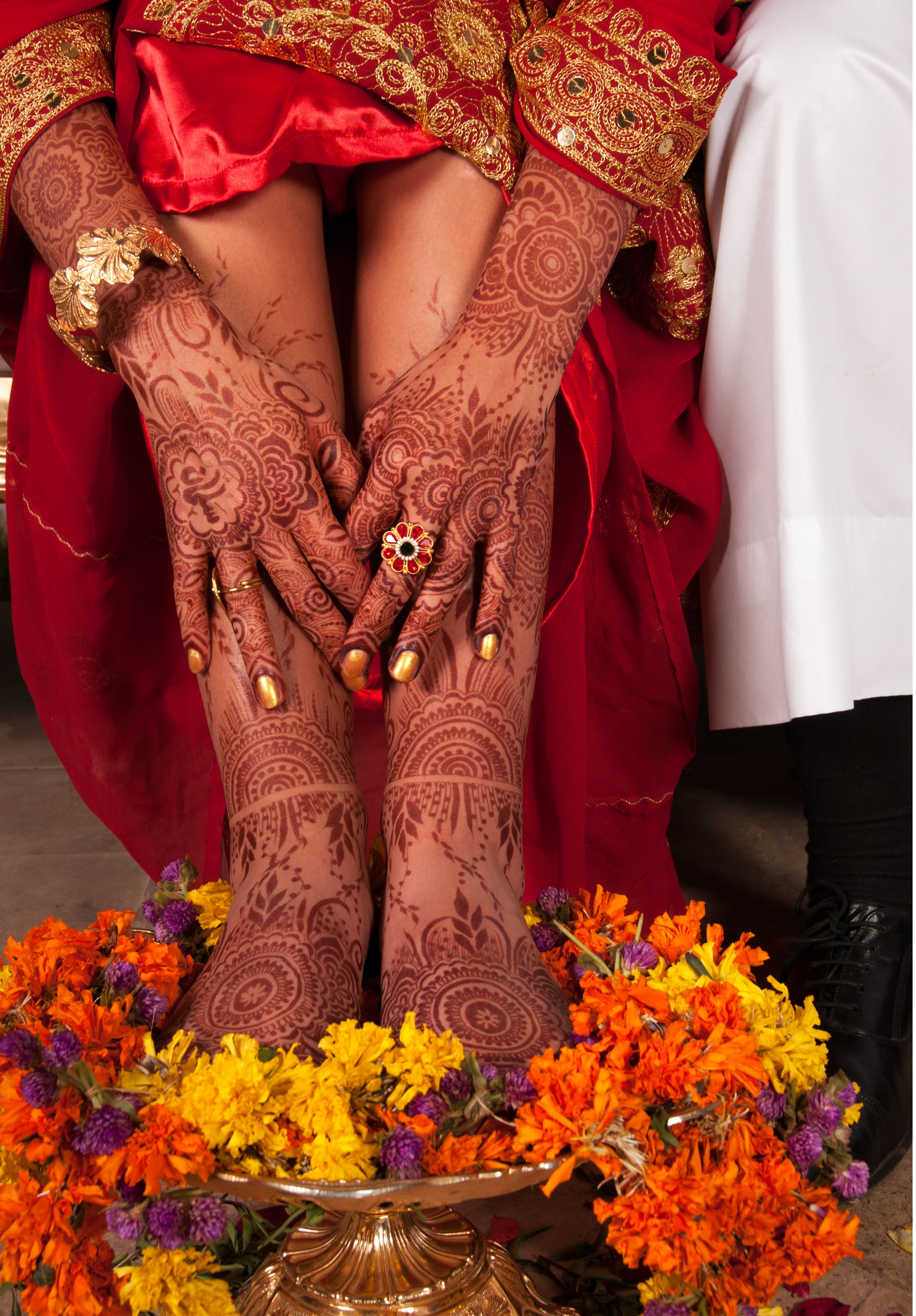
Wedding henna

The henna ceremony, henna night (Arabic: ليلة الحناء), or mehndi night (also henna party or mehndi party) is an element of wedding ceremony in many cultures influenced by the Arabic culture. Details vary, but it typically involves decorating the arms and feet of the bride with artwork using henna (known as mehndi in the Indian subcontinent). In many traditions, the groom and other family members or guests also receive henna designs. The name "henna night" refers to the fact that in most cultures, it happens on the last night before the wedding day.

== Background ==
Henna (Lawsonia inermis) is a plant commonly grown for commercial or domestic purposes in areas stretching from Africa to Asia. The bushy or sometimes tree-like plant contains small, light-colored flowers in addition to leaves; these leaves can be crushed and mixed with water to produce a colored paste that permanently affects the skin after being applied. Henna may also be used to decorate the nails. Henna has been used as an art form or a form of body decoration for thousands of years, and its use has since been expanded to many different countries, cultures, religions, and ethnic groups in different parts of the world.

== Marriage practices ==
=== History ===
Henna is used in the marriage practices of multiple religions and cultures, including Islam, Judaism, and Hinduism. Pieces of historical evidence, such as Egyptian hieroglyphics and Mesopotamian statues (from Babylon, Mari, and Sumer), indicate that henna was used by early civilizations in various parts of the Middle East, even before the rise of Islam. Assyrians from the 8th century BC are one of the earliest known peoples to have used henna in a marital context; Assyrian text from this period mentions that henna dye (referred to as henneh) was applied to the palms and fingernails of women who were getting married. Henna's role within these ancient cultures has not always been associated with marriage, however, as the ancient Egyptians' use for it may have been tied to their burial practices. As Islamic cultures and traditions gradually spread throughout more of the region and were brought further into the hearts of Africa and Asia, henna’s role as a celebratory or ceremonial device used in tandem with weddings was spread as well. Henna's influence and uses, including those related to weddings, have since been passed on to other regions across North America and Europe.

=== Ceremonial traditions and significance ===
At its most basic level, henna’s function in relation to marriage is generally similar to that of a tattoo. These intricate patterns or designs are applied to the skin shortly before marriage is set to take place; the time at which the henna ceremony itself takes place varies from culture to culture. It may take place the night directly before the wedding ceremony, or it may occur further in advance, even roughly a month before the wedding itself. In Moroccan Jewish wedding traditions, henna is involved throughout the entire wedding process, which occurs over multiple days. In these instances, henna designs (believed to please supernatural beings and provide protection) are applied to both the bride and groom. Some henna may even be worked into the hair of the bride by ceremony attendees, who wish her a happy marriage.

In countries such as Saudi Arabia, henna ceremonies that celebrate brides-to-be often require input from a bride’s family member, specifically another woman who is already involved in a healthy marriage. As a means of ensuring good luck for the upcoming newlywed couple, this already-married relative is responsible for designing the overall look of the henna that will be applied to the new bride. For Hindi and Urdu-speaking cultures in South Asia, henna (also known as mehndi) is similarly believed to be representative of good fortune, though these unique designs are often more elaborate and may cover a more extensive portion of the body.

Henna ceremonies and the various forms they can take have been compared to the bachelorette parties that are common in many Western cultures, as both types of festive gatherings involve activities such as performing music, dancing, and providing food and drinks. Money and other gifts are frequently given to brides at these events as well.

== See also ==
- Sindoor
