= Samakele =

- Town
- Location in Mali
- Coordinates: 13°7′N 5°1′W
- Country: Mali
- Region: Koulikoro Region
- Cercle: Banamba Cercle
- Commune: Ben Kadi
- Time zone: UTC+0 (GMT)

Samakele is a small town and seat of the commune of Ben Kadi in the Cercle of Banamba in the Koulikoro Region of south-western Mali.
