= Mehndi =

Temporary skin decoration

Mehndi applied on hands and forearms

Mehndi applied on legs

Mehndi stain

Mehndi or mehendi is a form of temporary skin decoration using a paste created with henna. It is a popular form of body art in the Indian Subcontinent and resembles similar traditions of henna as body art found in North Africa, East Africa and the Middle East. In the West, mehndi is commonly known as henna tattoo. The standard color of mehndi is brown, but other design colors such as white, red, black and gold are sometimes used.

In the Indian Subcontinent, mehndi is traditionally applied during many celebrations, especially weddings, religious festivals, and family ceremonies. It is applied on hands, wrists and forearms and in feet, ankles and lower legs. In many communities, it is often extended up to and above the elbows and knees. Common motifs include flowers, vines and leaves, paisleys, peacocks, mandalas, religious symbols, and the names or initials of the bride and groom hidden within the design.

"Mehndi" is a term used amongst the Indian Subcontinent, whereas 'henna" is used more commonly in the Middle East. Designs and patterns are distinct from region to region. For example, South Asian designs are characterized by small, intricate patterns and lines, while Middle Eastern designs typically consist of floral patterns. Mehndi also has been a part of African cultures as well, and designs there consist of more simple, geometric patterns.

Mehndi is also used to colour white hair. Muslim men often use it to dye their beard. Some people, such as those with alopecia or cancer treatment-related hair loss, may also decide to adorn their scalps.

== Etymology ==
The term "mehndi" derives from the Sanskrit word mendhikā, which refers to the henna plant (Lawsonia inermis), whose leaves produce a reddish-brown dye used for body decoration and other purposes. The word entered various South Asian languages, including Hindi, Urdu, Punjabi, Gujarati, and Bengali, where it came to denote both the henna paste and the art of applying decorative designs with it. According to A Dictionary of Urdu, Classical Hindi and English, mehndi may also refer to a wedding-related celebration associated with the ceremonial application of henna.

== Origins ==
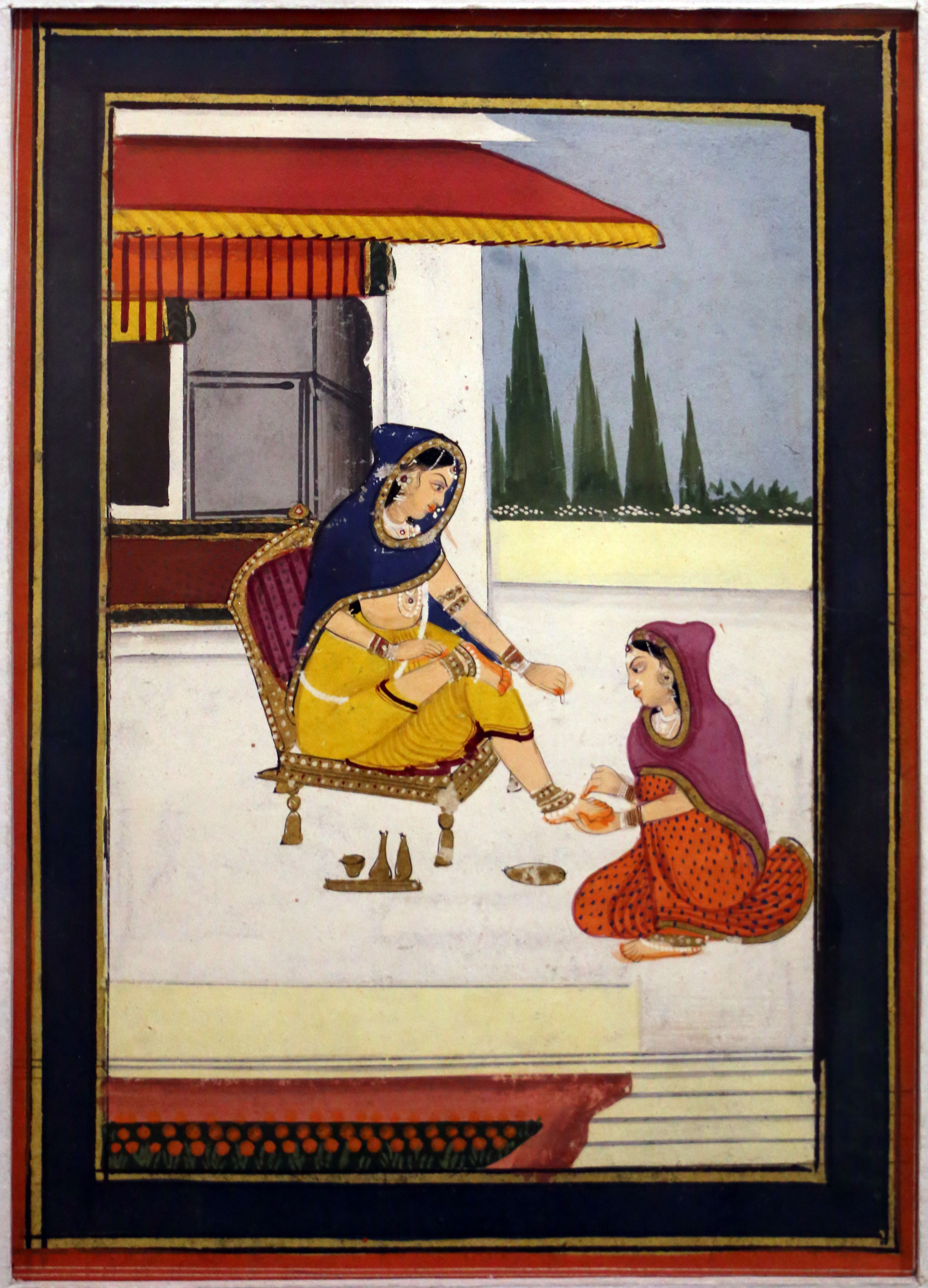
A painting of Mehandi design practice at Salar Jung Museum.

The earliest use of henna dye can be traced back to ancient Babylon and Egypt. In 6th-century Arabia, its use was well known and used in medicine, overlapping with certain pagan customs in the same historical and cultural context as Islam. In India, it was in use by the 4th century CE, which is evidenced by the cave art of Deccan region.. However, it likely became prevalent around the 12th century CE, aided by the rise of Islam in the subcontinent.

Henna in the Indian Subcontinent existed for thousands of years, however, became more popularized during the Mughal Empire, which lasted from the early 1500s to mid 1800s. The Mughals were a Muslim dynasty which ruled India and heavily influenced the culture, architecture styles, and patterns we see within the subcontinent.

== Process ==
Video of mehndi application

The paste is made from the powdered dry leaves of the henna plant, Lawsonia inermis.

Mehndi paste is usually applied to the skin using a plastic cone, a paintbrush, or a stick. Fifteen to twenty minutes after application, the mud will dry and begin to crack. The painted area is then wrapped with tissue, plastic, or medical tape to lock in body heat, creating a more intense colour on the skin. Some modern application techniques involve wrapping the painted area to enhance color intensity. Often times, lemon juice, sugar, and essential oils are used with mehndi to help develop the color further and darken it.

When first removed, the henna design is pale to dark orange in color and gradually darkens through oxidation over the course of 24 to 72 hours. The final color is reddish brown and can last anywhere from one to three weeks depending on the quality and type of henna paste applied, as well as where it was applied on the body (thicker skin stains darker and longer than thin skin).

Likely due to the desire for a "tattoo-black" appearance, some people add the synthetic dye p-phenylenediamine (PPD) to henna to give it a black color. PPD may cause moderate to severe allergic reactions when applied to skin.

== Usage ==
For Hindus, it is a beloved tradition during weddings and is deeply rooted in culture and beliefs. The art form symbolizes prosperity and good fortune. Many families hold a dedicated wedding ceremony known as Mehndi or Mehendi Night, where mehndi is applied on the bride and groom. Family and friends also apply mehndi to their hands and forearms in this ceremony. The ceremony also involves traditional foods being given to the guests and usually some form of traditional dancing and music. In Indian culture, it is a cultural joke that the darker the colour of the mehndi, the more a person's partner (or future partner) loves them.

Mehndi is commonly applied during hindu festivals like Karva Chauth, Vat Purnima, Diwali, Bhai Dooj, Navratri, Durga Puja, Raksha Bandhan and Teej, and in muslim festivals like Eid al-Fitr and Eid al-Adha.

Among South Asian Muslims, mehndi ceremony is a common tradition for brides as well as other girls at weddings. It is also done for Eid on Chaand Raat. There are professionals as well for this, while other people do this on their own.

In Assam, apart from marriage, it is broadly used by unmarried women during Rongali Bihu..

== Popular patterns ==
=== Arabic designs ===
The Arabic mehndi pattern is drawn on the palm. Generally, it starts from one corner of the wrist and ends at the fingertip on the opposite corner. Vines, lace, and flowers are the main elements of this pattern.

=== Mandala designs ===
Mandala is a geometric configuration of symbols used in various spiritual traditions, including Hinduism, Buddhism, Jainism, and Shinto. Various configurations of Mandala are drawn on the center of the palm in this mehndi pattern.

== See also ==
- Alta
- Body painting
- Jagua tattoo
- Masonjoany
- Temporary tattoo
