= Blunt-leaved senna =

Blunt-leaved senna is a common name for several plants and may refer to:

- Senna artemisioides, native to Australia
- Senna obtusifolia, globally distributed in warm climates
- Senna italica, native to Africa and Asia
