= Touba, Mali =

Touba
- Town
- Location in Mali
- Coordinates: 12°51′N 4°33′W
- Country: Mali
- Region: Koulikoro Region
- Cercle: Banamba Cercle
- Commune: Duguwolowula
- Time zone: UTC+0 (GMT)

Touba is a small town and seat of the commune of Duguwolowula in the Cercle of Banamba in the Koulikoro Region of south-western Mali.
