= Henna =

Vegetable dye

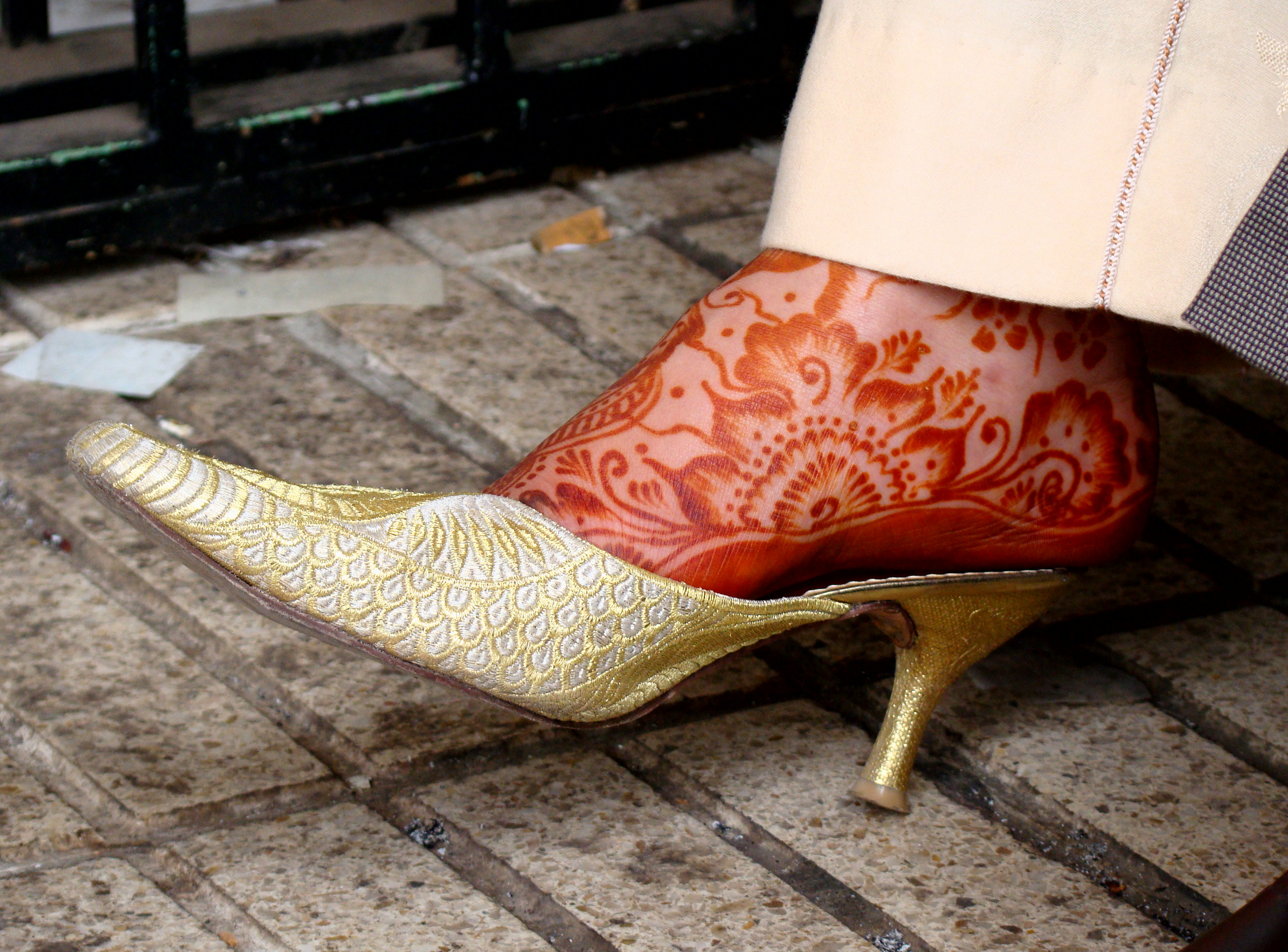
Henna pattern on a foot in Morocco

Henna is a dye made from dried, powdered leaves of Lawsonia inermis, used to produce reddish stains used in body art. It originates in North Africa and the Middle East, and has been used since at least antiquity across the region, including in ancient Egypt, as well as in ancient Mesopotamia and broader pre-Islamic Arabian cultures, as a hair and body dye, notably in the temporary body art of mehndi (or “henna tattoo”) resulting from the staining of the skin using dyes from the henna plant.

Henna has been used in ancient Egypt, ancient Near East and the Indian subcontinent to dye skin, hair, and fingernails; as well as fabrics including silk, wool, and leather. Historically, henna originates from North Africa, particularly ancient Egypt and the Maghreb (including present-day Morocco, Algeria, and Tunisia), as well as from the Middle East, including the Arabian Peninsula and West Asia. From these regions, its use gradually spread to Carthage and other parts of West Africa, Central Africa, the Horn of Africa, and later to the Indian subcontinent, as well as Eastern Europe; particularly in the Balkan, North Caucasian, Crimean, and Volga regions among Turkic, Slavic, Vlach, Albanian, and Kavkaz peoples.

The name henna is used in other skin and hair dyes, such as black henna and neutral henna, neither of which is derived from the henna plant.

== Etymology ==
The word henna comes from the Arabic حِنَّاء (ALA-LC: ḥinnāʾ; pronounced [ħɪnˈnæːʔ]).

== History ==
The origins of the initial human uses of henna are uncertain; however, there are records that the plant was marketed in Babylonia, and was used in Ancient Egypt on some mummies to dye their hair, skin, nails, or funeral wrappings. It arrived in the Maghreb region during the Punic civilization through Phoenician Diasporas where it was used as a beautification tool. Pliny the Elder wrote about its use in the Roman Empire as a medicine, a perfume, and a dye.

== Preparation and application ==
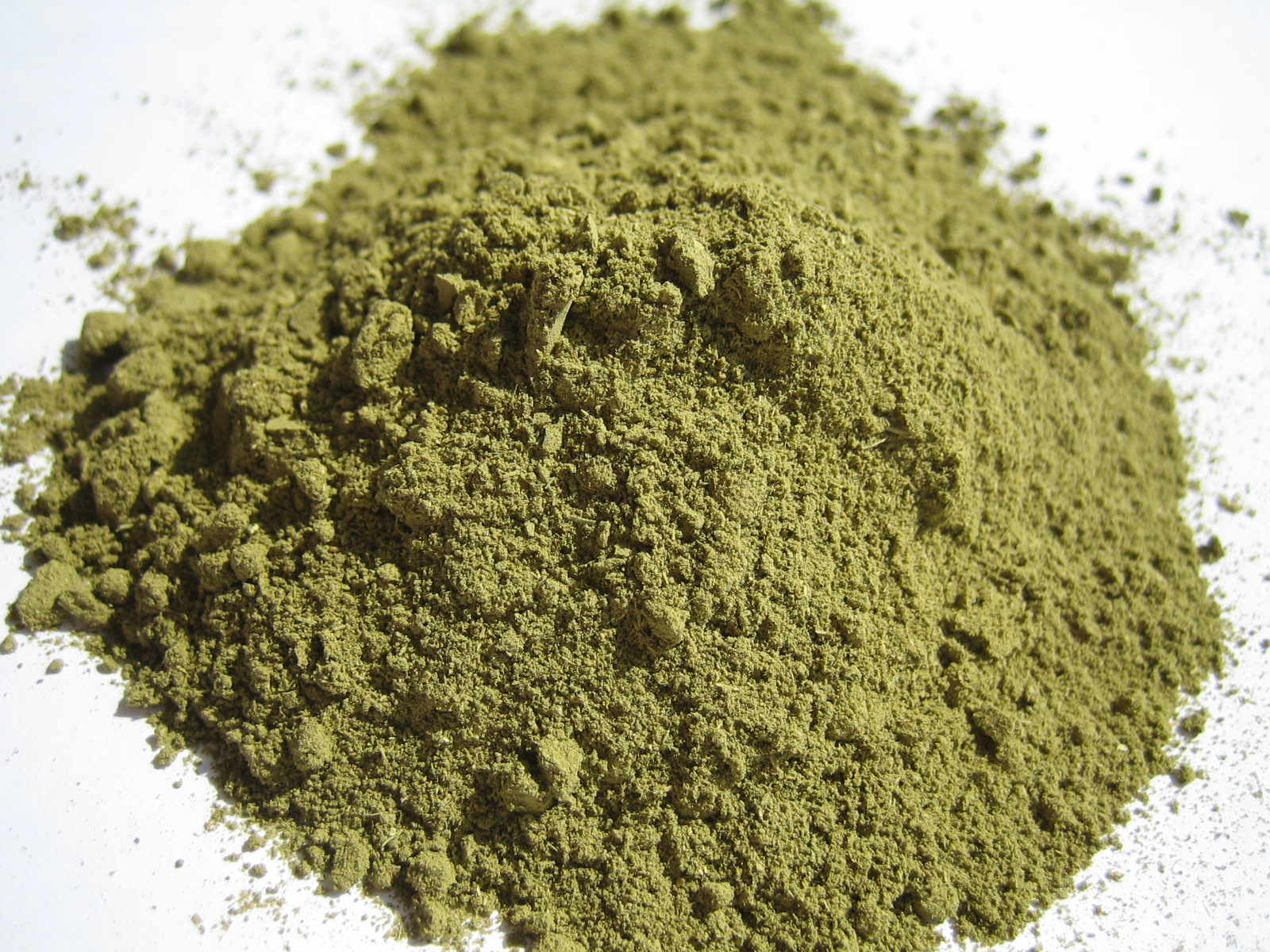
Henna powder

=== Body art ===
Whole, unbroken henna leaves will not stain the skin because the active chemical agent, lawsone, is bound within the plant. However, dried henna leaves will stain the skin if they are mashed into a paste. The lawsone will gradually migrate from the henna paste into the outer layer of the skin and bind to the proteins in it, creating a stain.

Since it is difficult to form intricate patterns from coarsely crushed leaves, henna is commonly traded as a powder made by drying, milling and sifting the leaves. The dry powder is mixed with one of a number of liquids, including water, lemon juice, strong tea, and other ingredients, depending on the tradition. Many artists use sugar or molasses in the paste to improve consistency to keep it stuck to the skin better. The henna mix must rest between one and 48 hours before use in order to release the lawsone from the leaf matter. The timing depends on the crop of henna being used. Essential oils with high levels of monoterpene alcohols, such as tea tree, cajuput, or lavender, will improve skin stain characteristics. Other essential oils, such as eucalyptus and clove, are not used because they can irritate the skin.

Video of henna being applied

The paste can be applied with many traditional and innovative tools, starting with a basic stick or twig. In Morocco, a syringe is common. A plastic cone similar to those used to pipe icing onto cakes is used in India. A light stain may be achieved within minutes, but the longer the paste is left on the skin, the darker and longer lasting the stain will be, so it needs to be left on as long as possible. To prevent it from drying or falling off the skin, the paste is often sealed down by dabbing a sugar/lemon mix over the dried paste or adding some form of sugar to the paste. After some time, the dry paste is simply brushed or scraped away. The paste should be kept on the skin for a minimum of four to six hours, but longer times and even wearing the paste overnight is a common practice. Removal should not be done with water, as water interferes with the oxidation process of stain development. Cooking oil may be used to loosen dry paste.

Henna stains are orange when the paste is first removed but darken over the following three days to a deep reddish brown due to oxidation. Soles and palms have the thickest layer of skin and so take up the most lawsone, and take it to the greatest depth, so that hands and feet will have the darkest and most long-lasting stains. Some also believe that steaming or warming the henna pattern will darken the stain, either during the time the paste is still on the skin or after the paste has been removed. It is debatable whether this adds to the color of the result as well. After the stain reaches its peak color, it holds for a few days, then gradually wears off by way of exfoliation, typically within one to three weeks.

Natural henna pastes containing only henna powder, a liquid (water, lemon juice, etc.) and an essential oil (lavender, cajuput, tea tree etc.) are not "shelf stable," meaning they expire quickly, and cannot be left out on a shelf for over one week without losing their ability to stain the skin.

Lawsone, an active compound in henna

The leaf of the henna plant contains a finite amount of lawsone. As a result, once the powder has been mixed into a paste, this leaching of dye molecules into the mixture will only occur for an average of two to six days. If a paste will not be used within the first few days after mixing, it can be frozen for up to four months to halt the dye release, for thawing and use at a later time. Commercially packaged pastes that remain able to stain the skin for longer than seven days without refrigeration or freezing contain other chemicals besides henna that may be dangerous to the skin. After the initial seven-day release of lawsone dye, the henna leaf is spent, therefore, any dye created by these commercial cones on the skin after this time period is actually the result of other compounds in the product. These chemicals are often undisclosed on packaging and have a wide range of colors, including what appears to be a natural-looking color stain produced by dyes such as sodium picramate. These products often do not contain any henna. There are many adulterated henna pastes such as these, and others, for sale today that are erroneously marketed as "natural", "pure", or "organic", all containing potentially dangerous undisclosed additives. The length of time a pre-manufactured paste takes to arrive in the hands of consumers is typically longer than the seven-day dye release window of henna, therefore one can reasonably expect that any pre-made mass-produced cone that is not shipped frozen is a potentially harmful adulterated chemical variety. ·

Henna only stains the skin one color, a variation of reddish brown, at full maturity three days after application.

Powdered fresh henna, unlike pre-mixed paste, can be easily shipped around the world and stored for many years in a well-sealed package.

Body art quality henna is often more finely sifted than henna powders for hair.

=== Hair/eyebrow dye ===
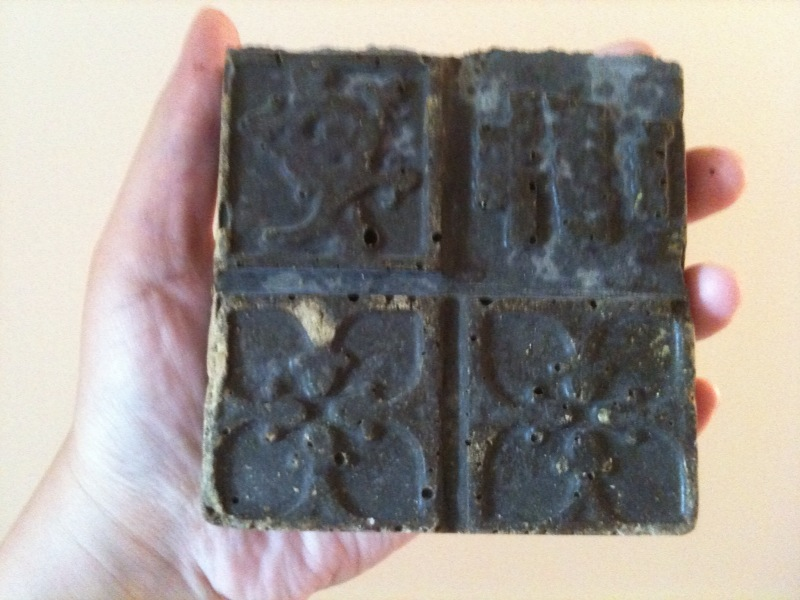
Cosmetic henna for colouring hair

In Ancient Egypt, Ahmose-Henuttamehu (17th Dynasty, 1574 BCE) was probably a daughter of Seqenenre Tao and Ahmose Inhapy. Smith reports that the mummy of Henuttamehu's own hair had been dyed a bright red at the sides, probably with henna. In Europe, henna was popular among women connected to the aesthetic movement and the Pre-Raphaelite artists of England in the 1800s. Dante Gabriel Rossetti's wife and muse, Elizabeth Siddal, had naturally bright red hair. Contrary to the cultural tradition in Britain that considered red hair unattractive, the Pre-Raphaelites fetishized red hair. Siddal was portrayed by Rossetti in many paintings that emphasized her flowing red hair. The other Pre-Raphaelites, including Evelyn De Morgan and Frederick Sandys, academic classicists such as Frederic Leighton, and French painters such as Gaston Bussière and the Impressionists, further popularized the association of henna-dyed hair and young bohemian women.

Opera singer Adelina Patti is sometimes credited with popularizing the use of henna in Europe in the late nineteenth century. Parisian courtesan Cora Pearl was often referred to as La Lune Rousse (the red-haired moon) for dyeing her hair red. In her memoirs, she relates an incident when she dyed her pet dog's fur to match her own hair. By the 1950s, Lucille Ball popularized "henna rinse" as her character, Lucy Ricardo, called it on the television show I Love Lucy. It gained popularity among young people in the 1960s through a growing interest in Eastern cultures.

Commercially packaged henna, intended for use as a cosmetic hair dye, originated in ancient Egypt and the ancient Near East and is now popular in many countries in South Asia, Europe, Australia, and North America. The color that results from dyeing with henna depends on the original color of the hair, as well as the quality of the henna, and can range from orange to auburn to burgundy. Henna can be mixed with other natural hair dyes, including Cassia obovata for lighter shades of red or even blond and indigo to achieve brown and black shades. Some products sold as "henna" include these other natural dyes. Others may include metal salts that can interact with other chemical treatments, oils and waxes that may inhibit the dye, or dyes which may be allergens.

Apart from its use as a hair dye, henna has recently been used as a temporary substitute for an eyebrow pencil or even as eyebrow embroidery.

== Body art ==
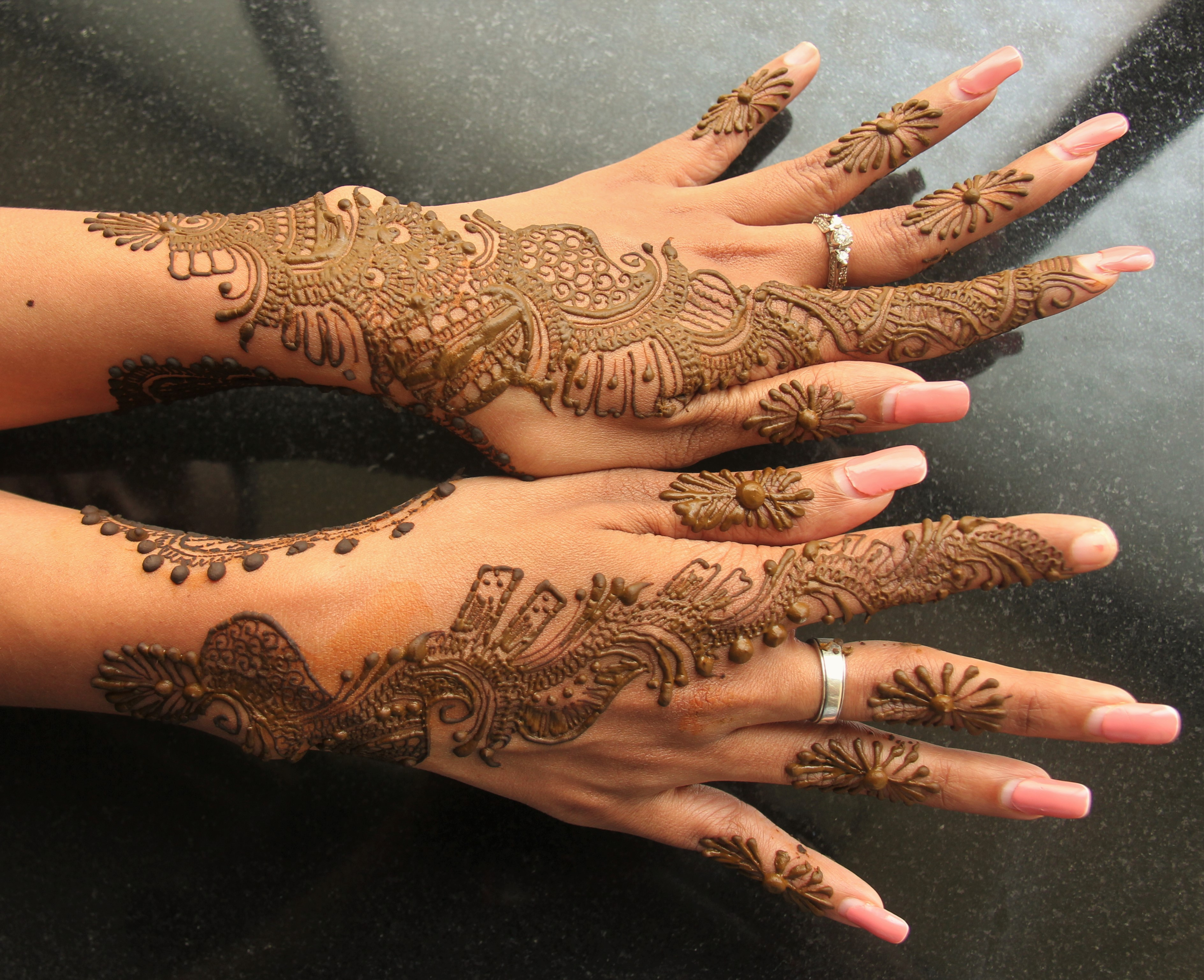
Mehndi (henna) applied to the back of both hands in India

Henna has been used to adorn young women's bodies as part of social and holiday celebrations since the late Bronze Age in the Eastern Mediterranean. The earliest text mentioning henna in the context of marriage and fertility celebrations comes from the Ugaritic legend of Baal and Anath, which has references to women marking themselves with henna in preparation to meet their husbands, and Anath adorning herself with henna to celebrate a victory over the enemies of Baal. Wall paintings excavated at Akrotiri (dating before the eruption of Thera in 1680 BCE) show women with markings consistent with henna on their nails, palms and soles, in a tableau consistent with the henna bridal description from Ugarit. Many statuettes of young women dating between 1500 and 500 BCE along the Mediterranean coastline have raised hands with markings consistent with henna. This early connection between young, fertile women and henna seems to be the origin of the Night of the Henna, which is now celebrated in all the Middle East.

The Night of the Henna was celebrated by most groups in the areas where henna grew naturally: Jews, Muslims, Sikhs, and Hindus among others, all celebrated marriages and weddings by adorning the bride, and often the groom, with henna.

Across the henna-growing region, Purim, Eid, Diwali, Karva Chauth, Passover, Mawlid, and most saints' days were celebrated with some henna. Favourite horses, donkeys, and salukis had their hooves, paws, and tails hennaed. Battle victories, births, circumcision, birthdays, Zār, as well as weddings, usually included some henna as part of the celebration. Bridal henna nights remain an important custom in many of these areas, particularly among traditional families.

Henna was regarded as having Barakah ("blessings"), and was applied for luck as well as joy and beauty. Brides typically had the most henna and the most complex patterns to support their greatest joy and wishes for luck. Some bridal traditions were very complex, such as those in Yemen, where the Jewish bridal henna process took four or five days to complete, with multiple applications and resist work. Specific henna designs may also vary by region. For example, geometric shapes such as triangles and diamonds characteristic of traditional Moroccan beading are represented in Moroccan henna designs.

The fashion of "Bridal Mehndi" in North India, Bangladesh, Northern Libya and Pakistan is currently growing in complexity and elaboration, with new innovations in glitter, gilding, and fine-line work. Recent technological innovations in grinding, sifting, temperature control, and packaging henna, as well as government encouragement for henna cultivation, have improved the dye content and artistic potential for henna.

Though traditional henna artists were from the Nai caste in India and barbering castes in other countries (lower social classes), talented contemporary henna artists can command high fees for their work. Women in countries where women are discouraged from working outside the home can find socially acceptable, lucrative work doing henna. Morocco, Mauritania, Yemen, Libya, Somalia, Kenya, Sudan, the United Arab Emirates, India and many other countries have thriving women's henna businesses. These businesses are often open all night for Eid, Diwali and Karva Chauth. Many women may work together during a large wedding, wherein hundreds of guests have henna applied to their body parts. This particular event at a marriage is known as the Mehndi Celebration or Mehndi Night or Laylat al Henna, and is mainly held for the bride and groom.

=== Regions ===
==== Algeria ====
In Algeria, brides receive gifts of jewellery and have henna painted on their hands before their weddings. The bride and the groom seal their vows in front of their guests by getting a circle-shaped henna applied on the palm of their hands. Usually, the grandmothers or mothers of the groom and bride apply this henna, and a small decorative pillow with a satin ribbon is attached to their hands for a few hours.

==== Afghanistan ====
In Afghanistan, henna is also known as "kheena". Afghan tradition holds that henna brings good luck and happiness. It is used by both men and women on many occasions such as wedding nights, Nawroz, Eidul fitr, Eidul Adha, Shabe-e Barat, and circumcision celebrations.

==== Armenia ====
Henna traditions were widespread in both eastern and western Armenia, however, the customs differ based on region. The henna night, called hina gisher or khennagedje in Armenian, has always been deemed an essential part of Armenian marriage traditions. In Kesaria, henna parties were organized by the bride’s female friends and family on the Friday before her wedding. Traditional Armenian henna was usually applied on the fingertips, however young women also received designs on their hands. In Nirzeh, elderly women applied henna to young girls and boys. Furthermore, in the Armenian communities of Sis, both the groom and the bride had henna nights, where the groom would get his hair cut and his friends bid for the honor of drawing the cross with henna on the hands of the groom and godfather. The tradition of hinadreq, painting the palms of a bride-to-be, is still practiced in parts of Armenia today as a sign of fertility and happiness in married life.

==== Bangladesh ====
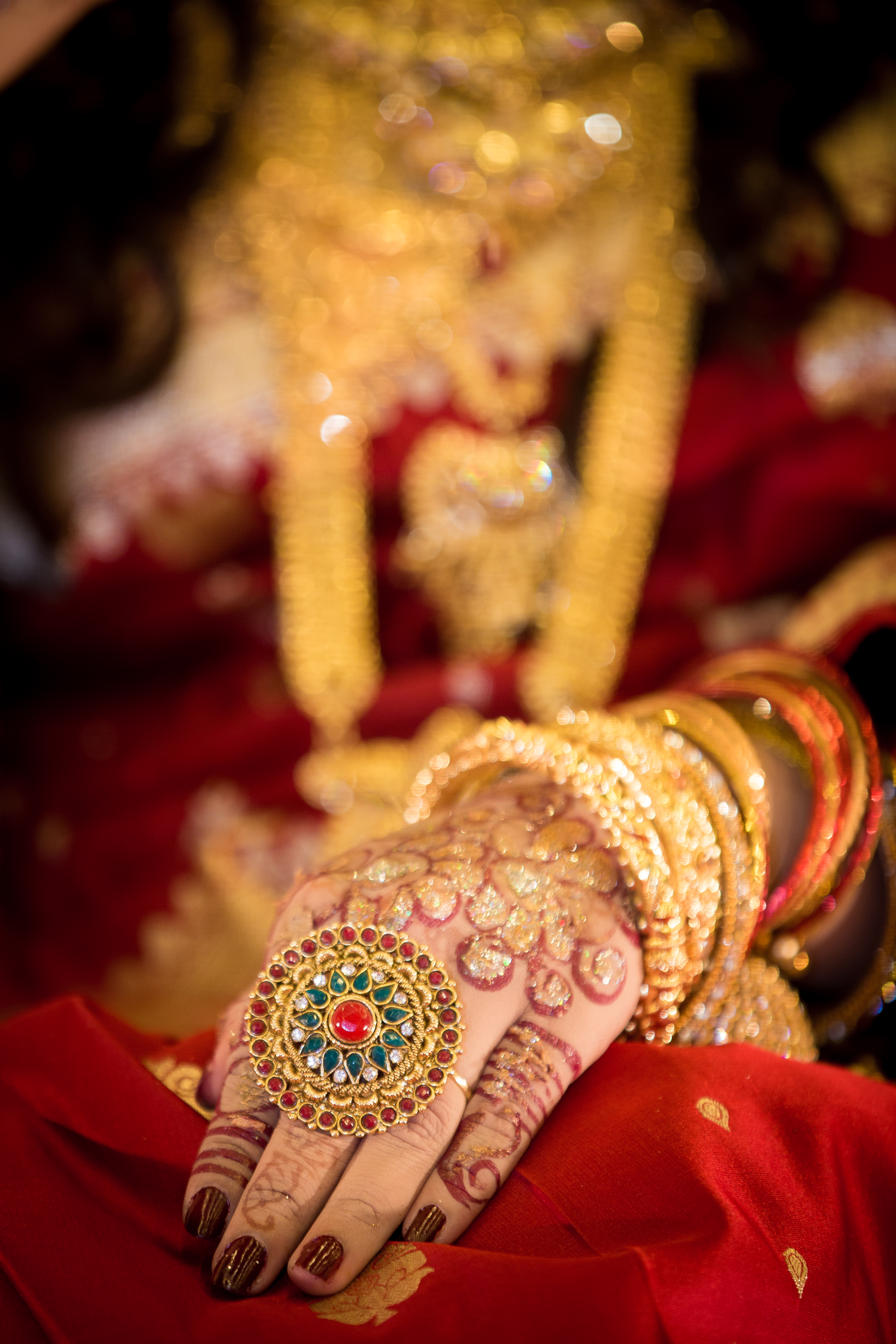
Hand of a Bengali Muslim bride on her wedding day

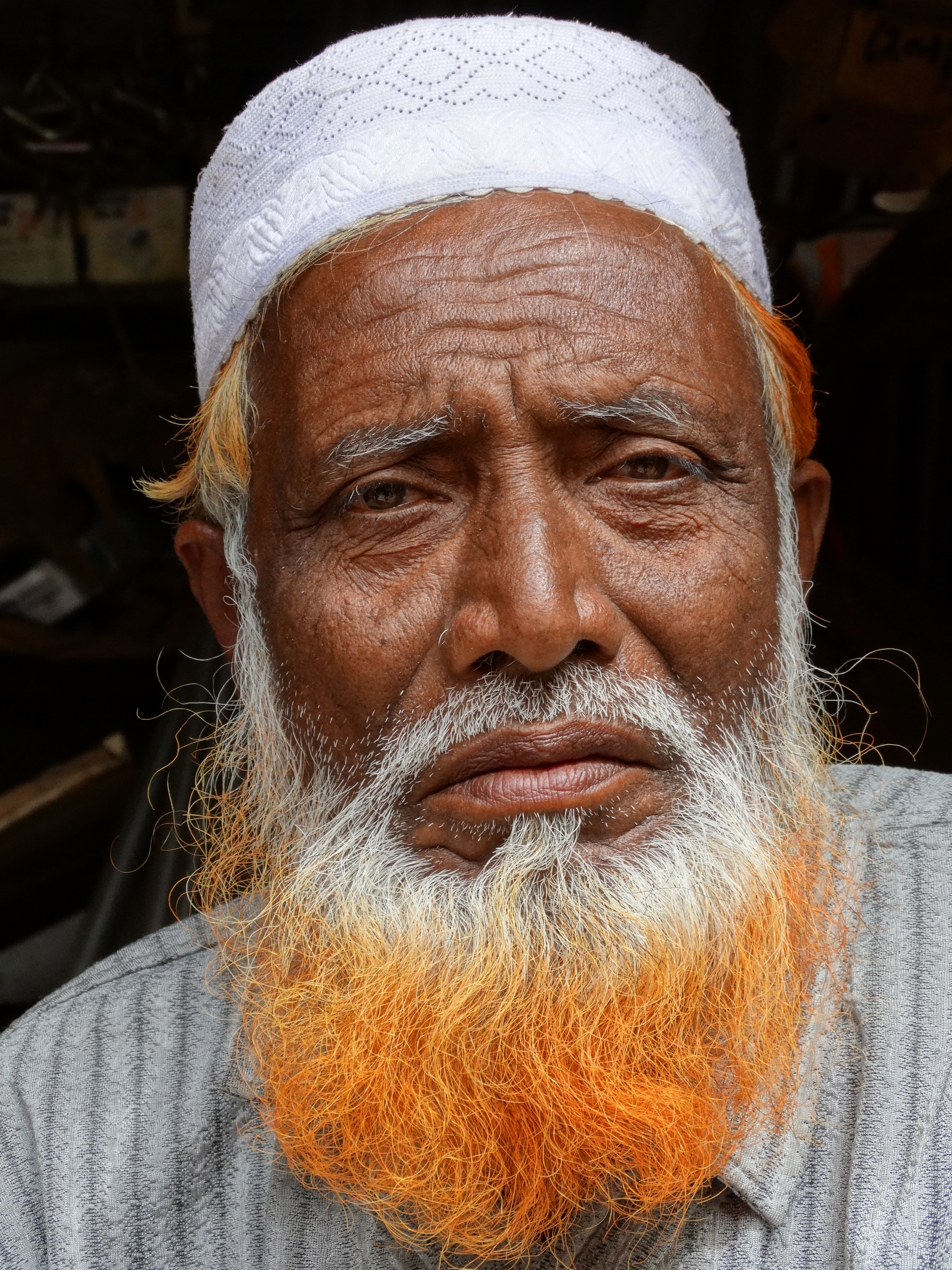
An elderly Bengali man in Dhaka with a beard dyed in henna

In Bangladesh, women use mehndi on hands on occasions like weddings and engagements as well as during Eid al-Fitr, Eid al-Adha and other events. In wedding ceremonies, the Mehndi ceremony has traditionally been separated into two events: one organized by the bride's family and one by the groom's family. These two events are solely dedicated for adorning the bride and groom in Mehndi and is known as a 'Mehndi Shondha' meaning the Evening of Mehndi.

Some brides tend to go for Alta. Sometimes, Hindu women also apply Mehendi instead (or along with) Alta on their feet during the Bodhu Boron ceremony.

==== Bulgaria ====
In an attempt to ritually clean a bride before her wedding day, Bulgarian Romani decorate the bride with a blot of henna. This blot symbolizes the drop of blood on the couples' sheets after consummating the marriage and breaking the female's hymen. The tradition also holds that the longer the henna lasts, the longer the husband will love his new bride.

==== Egypt ====
In Egypt, the bride gathers with her friends the night before her wedding day to celebrate the henna night.

==== India ====
In India, Hindus have motifs and tattoos on their hands and feet on occasions like weddings and engagements. In Kerala, women and girls, especially brides, have their hands decorated with Mailanchi. In North Indian wedding ceremonies, there is one evening solely dedicated for adorning the bride and groom in Mehndi, also known as 'Mehndi ki raat.

==== Iran ====
In Iran, the most common use of henna is among the long wedding rituals practiced in Iran. The henna ritual, which is called ḥanā-bandān, is held for both the bride and the bridegroom during the wedding week The ceremony is held before the wedding and is a traditional farewell ritual for newlyweds before they officially start their life together in a new house. The ceremonies take place in the presence of family members, friends, relatives, neighbors, and guests.

In Iran, Māzār (Persian: مازار) is indicating a job title for a person whose work is associated with the milling or grinding henna leaves and sell it in a powder form. This type of business is an old job still alive in some parts of Iran, especially in the world-recognized archeologically ancient "Yazd" province. The most famous one is a family-owned business by "Mazar Atabaki" families resided in the land hundreds of years ago. Māzāri (Persian: مازاری) is a place for milling henna mixed with other herbs.

==== Israel & Palestine ====
In Palestine, Israel and territories of the Palestinian National Authority, some Middle Eastern and North African Jewish communities and families, also Druze, Christian and Muslim ones, host henna parties the night or week before a wedding, according to familial customs. Sephardic Jews and Mizrahi Jews, such as Moroccan Jews and Yemenite Jews who have immigrated to Israel, continue these familial customs.

==== Kenya ====
Henna on a bride's hands at a wedding in Kenya

In Kenya, henna has long been associated with wedding traditions in certain regions.

==== Malaysia ====
In Malaysia, henna (Malay: inai) is used to adorn the bride and groom's hands before the wedding at a berinai ceremony.

==== Morocco ====
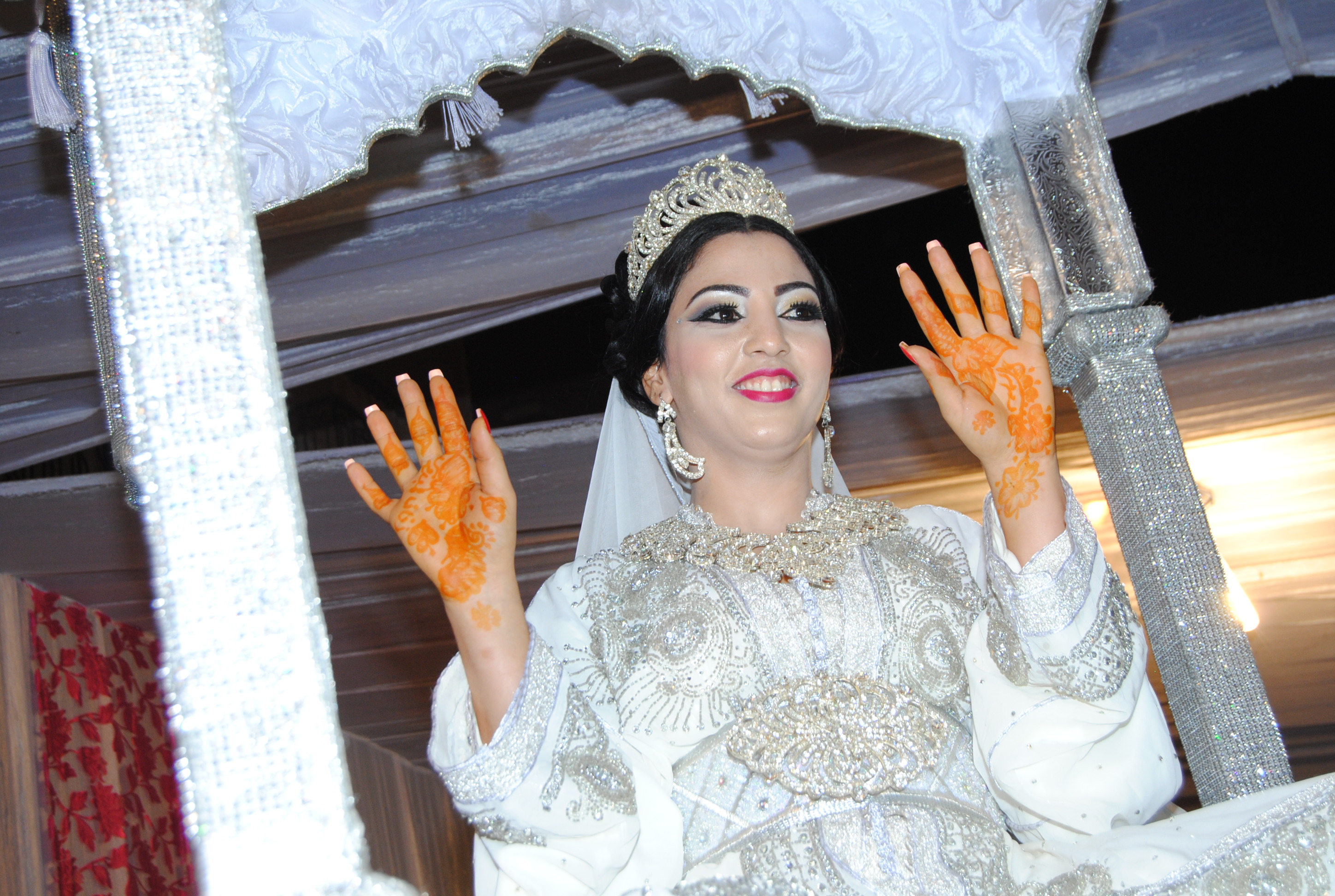
Moroccan bride

In Morocco, henna is applied symbolically when individuals go through life cycle events. Moroccans refer to the paste as henna and the designs as naqsh, which means painting or inscription. In Morocco, there are two types of henna artists: non-specialists, who traditionally partake in wedding rituals, and specialists, who partake in tourism and decorative henna. Nqaasha, the low-end Henna specialists, are known for attracting tourists, which they refer to as gazelles or international tourists, in artisan slang.

For Moroccans, a wedding festival can last up to 5 days, with 2 days involving henna art. One of these days is referred to as azmomeg (meaning unknown), and is the Thursday before the wedding when guests are invited to apply henna to the bride. The other henna ceremony occurs after the wedding ceremony, called the Day of Henna. On this day, typically an older woman applies henna to the bride after she dips in the mikveh to ward off evil spirits who may be jealous of the newlyweds. The groom is also painted with henna after the wedding. During the groom's henna painting, he commonly wears black clothing; this tradition emerged from the Pact of Umar as the Jews were not permitted to dress similar to colorful Muslim dress in Morocco.

==== Pakistan ====
In Pakistan, henna is often used in weddings, Eid ul fitr, Eidul Adha, milad and other events. The henna ceremony is known as the Rasm-e-Heena, which is often one of the most important pre-wedding ceremonies celebrated by both the bride and groom's families. The night of mehndi, the gathering at which the application of the henna is performed, usually falls on the second day of the festivities and one day before the wedding itself. The process commonly involves only the bride and groom but can also include close friends or other family members. The hands of the wedding couple are elegantly painted on this night to act as a sign of their union.

In Sindh, henna is known as "Mehndi" and serves both as a decorative art on the hands, arms, feet, and legs, and as a natural dye for gray hair, used by both women and men in every ceremonial occasion, events and festivals. Mehndi is applied with traditional designs featuring motifs like mor (peacock), badak (duck), tikra (dotted), other floral and geometric designs are also used. Typically, female relatives apply henna to the groom’s hands and feet as part of the wedding ritual.

Henna is both offered and received as part of religious rituals during the urs and mela (fairs) honoring Sufi saints.

On the 7th day of Muharram, the tradition of carrying Mehndi to pay respect to Hazrat Imam Qasim a.s is observed each year.

==== Saudi Arabia ====
In Saudi Arabia, henna has long been associated with wedding traditions in certain regions. Women adorn their hands and feet with intricate henna designs during these occasions. The night before the wedding is referred to as the "Henna Night" or “Al-Ghumra.” On this evening female relatives of the bride and groom gather at the bride's family home to decorate the bride's hands and feet with henna patterns.

During Eid Al-Fitr and Eid Al-Adha, women also come together to prepare special henna mixtures for designs that vary by age group.

On December 3, 2024, the tradition of "Henna, rituals, aesthetic and social practices" was inscribed on UNESCO’s Intangible Cultural Heritage List. This recognition was a collaborative effort between 16 Arab countries, including Saudi Arabia, Sudan, Egypt, the UAE, Iraq, Jordan, Kuwait, Palestine, Tunisia, Algeria, Bahrain, Morocco, Mauritania, Oman, Yemen, and Qatar. The nomination was led by the United Arab Emirates, with Saudi Arabia represented by the Heritage Commission, in cooperation with the Saudi National Commission for Education, Culture, and Science, and Saudi Arabia's permanent delegation to UNESCO.

==== Somalia ====
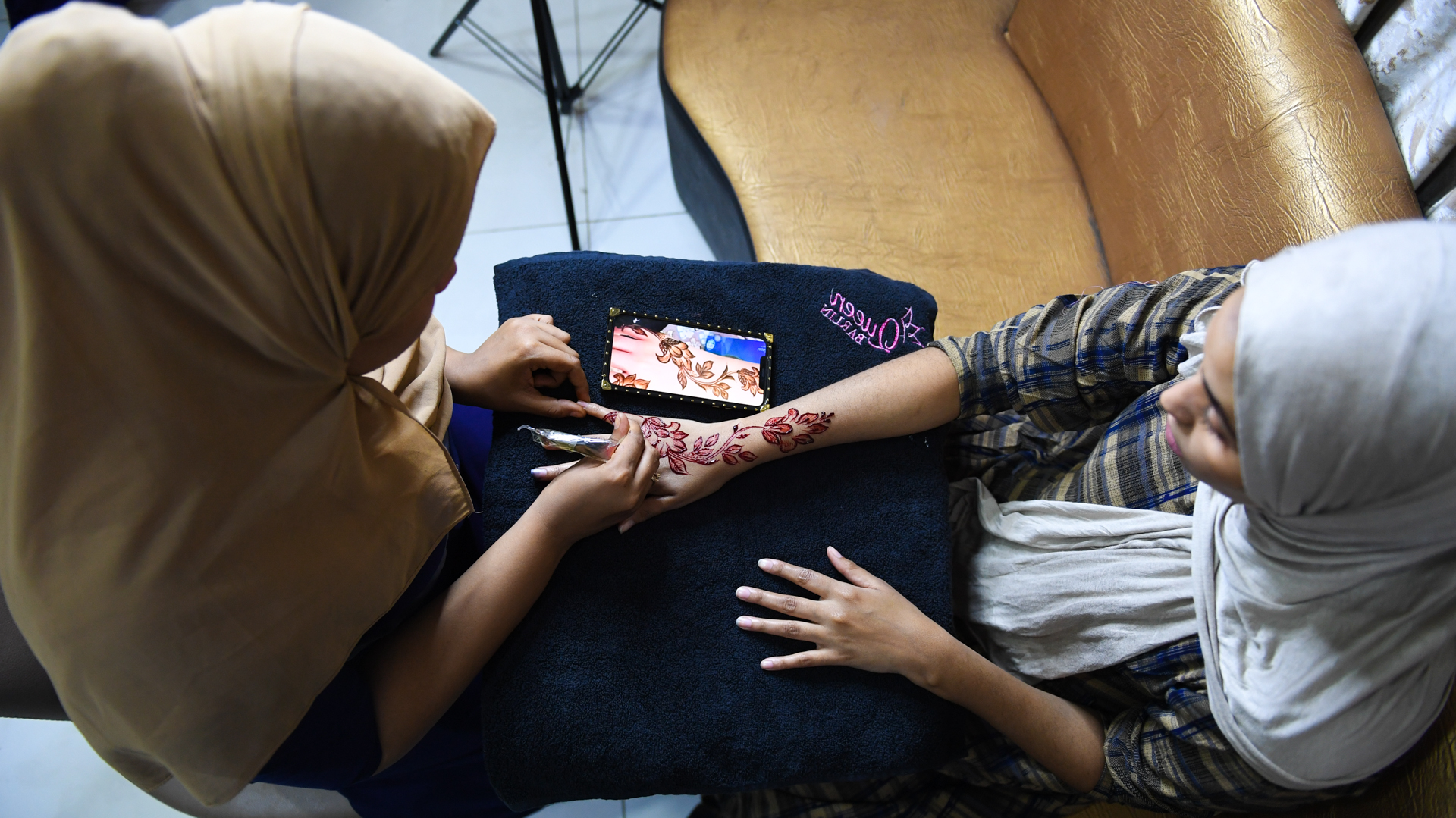
A Henna artist applies henna on a client at a beauty shop in Mogadishu

In Somalia, henna has been used for centuries. It is cultivated from the leaves of the Ellan tree, which grows wild in the mountainous regions of Somalia. It is used for practical purposes such as dyeing hair and also more extravagantly by coloring the fingers and toes of married women and creating intricate designs. It is also applied to the hands and feet of young Somali women in preparation for their weddings and all the Islamic celebrations. Sometimes also done by young school girls for several occasions

==== Spain ====
Henna was cultivated in the Nasrid kingdom of Granada and applied to the face and hair by both sexes. After the Castilian conquest of Granada (1492), it was forbidden for Moriscos as it was a sign distinguishing them from Old Christians. After the expulsion of the Moriscos (1609–1614), cultivation ceased.

==== Sudan ====
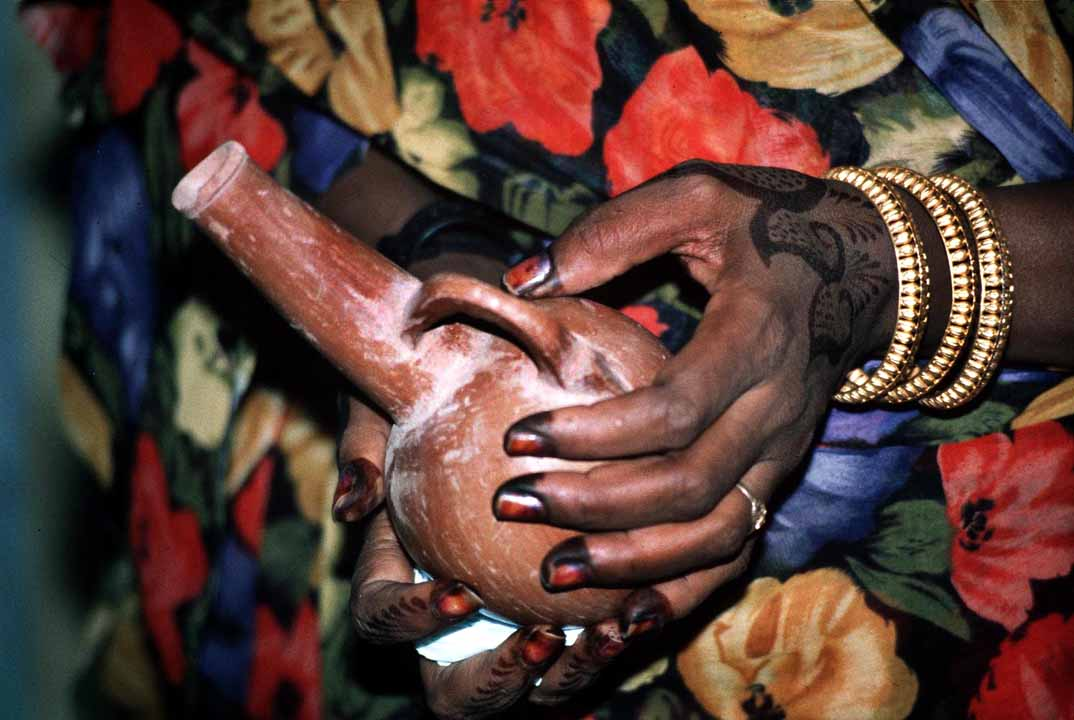
Woman with henna-stained hands in Khartoum, Sudan

In Sudan, Henna dyes are regarded with a special sanctity in Sudan and for that reason they are always present during happy occasions: weddings in particular.

Henna has been part of Sudan's social and cultural heritage ever since the days of Sudan's ancient civilizations, where both would-be couples would get their hands and feet pigmented with this natural dye.

Children also have their hands and feet dyed with henna during their circumcision festivity.

==== Tunisia ====
In Tunisia, the traditional wedding process begins 8 days before the wedding ceremony when a basket is delivered to the bride, which contains henna. The mother of the groom supervises the process in order to ensure all is being done correctly. Today, the groom accompanies the bride in the ritual at the henna party, but the majority of henna painting is done on the bride's body.

==== Turkey ====
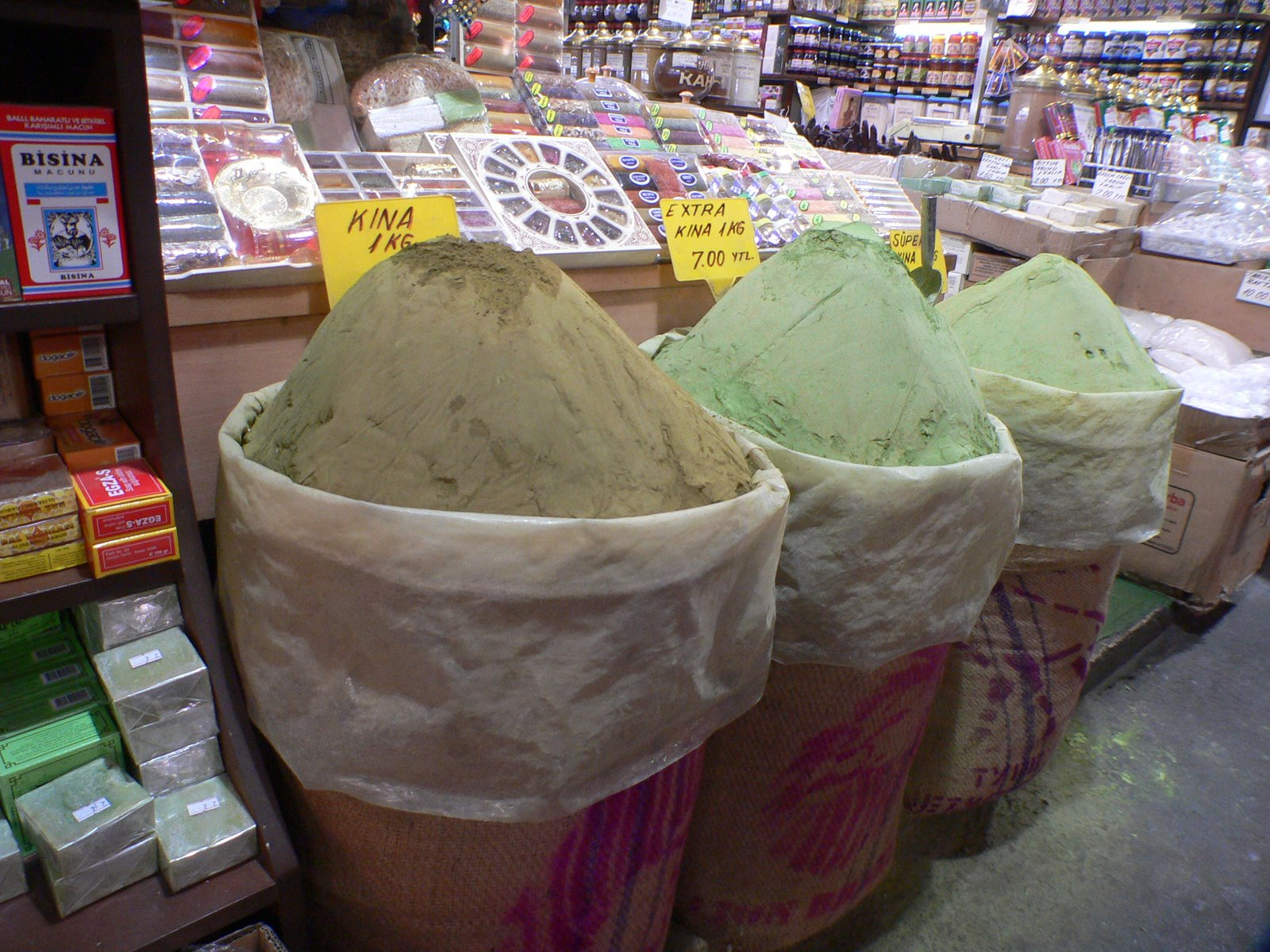
Henna being sold at the Egyptian Bazaar in Istanbul, Turkey

During the Victorian era, Turkey was a major exporter of henna for use in dyeing hair. Henna parties were commonly practiced in Turkey similarly to Arab countries.

==== Yemen ====
For Yemenite Jews, most of them living in Israel, the purpose of a henna party is to ward off evil from the couple before their wedding.

The bride is painted in henna mixed by her mother. The mixture consists of rose water, eggs, cognac, salt, and shadab, believed to be a magical herb that repels evil. The bride changes into a less elaborate outfit and incense is burned while she is painted with henna. Then, another zavfa (procession) occurs as the bride returns to her party.

Back at the henna party, the bride sits on stage while family members and friends come up to her to have their palms marked with blots of henna. These marks represent the long-lasting marriage as henna remains for many days. It also represents the blood from breaking the hymen upon consummating the marriage on the wedding night. Others add that the red stain on the hands of the guests is to mislead the evil spirits of the Jinn who are looking for the bride. After the painting, the party ends after lasting about 4 or 5 hours.

== Health effects ==
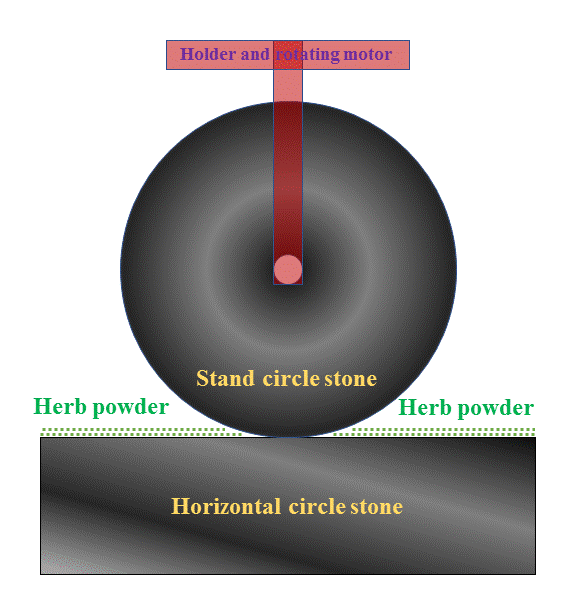
A system to mill henna and other herbs

Henna is known to be dangerous to people with glucose-6-phosphate dehydrogenase deficiency (G6PD deficiency), which is more common in males than females. Infants and children of particular ethnic groups, mainly from the Middle East and North Africa, are especially vulnerable.

Though user accounts cite few other negative effects of natural henna paste, save for occasional mild allergic reactions (often associated with lemon juice or essential oils in a paste and not the henna itself), pre-mixed commercial henna body art pastes may have undisclosed ingredients added to darken stain or to alter the stain color. The health risks involved in pre-mixed paste can be significant. The United States Food and Drug Administration (FDA) does consider these risks to be adulterants and therefore illegal for use on skin. Some commercial pastes have been noted to include: p-Phenylenediamine, sodium picramate, amaranth (red dye #2 banned in the US in 1976), silver nitrate, carmine, pyrogallol, disperse orange dye, and chromium. These have been found to cause allergic reactions, chronic inflammatory reactions, or late-onset allergic reactions to hairdressing products and textile dyes.

The U.S. FDA has not approved henna for direct application to the skin. It is, however, grandfathered in as a hair dye and can only be imported for that purpose. Henna imported into the U.S. that appears to be for use as body art is subject to seizure, but prosecution is rare. Commercial henna products that are adulterated often claim to be 100% natural on product packaging in order to pass import regulations in other countries.

== Black henna ==
Natural henna produces a rich red-brown stain, which can darken in the days after it is first applied and last for several weeks. It is sometimes referred to as "red henna" to differentiate it from products sold as "black henna" or "neutral henna," which may not actually contain henna, but are instead made from other plants or dyes.

Black henna powder may be derived from indigo (from the plant Indigofera tinctoria). It may also contain unlisted dyes and chemicals such as para-phenylenediamine (PPD), which can stain skin black quickly, but can cause severe allergic reactions and permanent scarring if left on for more than 2–3 days. The FDA specifically forbids PPD to be used for this purpose and may prosecute those who produce black henna. Artists who injure clients with black henna in the U.S. may be sued for damages. The name arose from imports of plant-based hair dyes into the West in the late 19th century. Partly fermented, dried indigo was called black henna because it could be used in combination with henna to dye hair black. This gave rise to the belief that there was such a thing as black henna which could dye skin black. Indigo will not dye skin black. Pictures of indigenous people with black body art (either alkalized henna or from some other source) also fed the belief that there was such a thing as black henna.

A neutral henna does not change the colour of hair. This is not henna powder; it is usually the powder of the plant Senna italica (often referred to by the synonym Cassia obovata) or closely related Cassia and Senna species.

== para-phenylenediamine ==
Para-phenylenediamine (shown here) is chemically very different from the lawsone found in henna.

In the 1990s, henna artists in Africa, India, Bali, the Arabian Peninsula and the West began to experiment with PPD-based black hair dye, applying it as a thick paste as they would apply henna, in an effort to find something that would quickly make jet-black temporary body art. PPD can cause severe allergic reactions, with blistering, intense itching, permanent scarring, and permanent chemical sensitivities. Estimates of allergic reactions range between 3% and 15%. Henna does not cause these injuries. Black henna made with PPD can cause lifelong sensitization to coal tar derivatives while black henna made with gasoline, kerosene, lighter fluid, paint thinner, and benzene has been linked to adult acute leukemia.

The most frequent serious health consequence of having a black henna temporary tattoo is sensitization to hair dye and related chemicals. If a person has had a black henna tattoo and later dyes their hair with chemical hair dye, the allergic reaction may be life-threatening and require hospitalization. Because of the frequency of PPD allergic reactions, chemical hair dye products now post warnings on the labels: "Temporary black henna tattoos may increase your risk of allergy. Do not colour your hair if: ... – you have experienced a reaction to a temporary black henna tattoo in the past."

PPD is illegal for use on skin in Western countries, though enforcement is difficult. Physicians have urged governments to legislate against black henna because of the frequency and severity of injuries, especially to children. To assist the prosecution of vendors, government agencies encourage citizens to report injuries and illegal use of PPD black henna. When used in hair dye, the PPD amount must be below 6%, and application instructions warn that the dye must not touch the scalp and must be quickly rinsed away. Black henna pastes have PPD percentages from 10% to 80%, and are left on the skin for half an hour.

PPD black henna use is widespread, particularly in tourist areas. Because the blistering reaction appears 3 to 12 days after the application, most tourists have left and do not return to show how much damage the artist has done. This permits the artists to continue injuring others, unaware they are causing severe injuries. The high-profit margins of black henna and the demand for body art that emulates "tribal tattoos" further encourage artists to deny the dangers.

It is not difficult to recognize and avoid PPD black henna:

- if a paste stains skin on the torso black in less than ½ hour, it has PPD in it.
- if the paste is mixed with peroxide, or if peroxide is wiped over the design to bring out the color, it has PPD in it.

PPD sensitivity is lifelong. A person who has become sensitized through black henna tattoos may have future allergic reactions to perfumes, printer ink, chemical hair dyes, textile dye, photographic developer, sunscreen and some medications. A person who has had a black henna tattoo should consult their physician about the health consequences of PPD sensitization.

== See also ==
- Achiote (urucum, annatto), another plant that stains skin orange red
- Genipa americana, a plant that stains the skin blue black, the active ingredient in Jagua tattoos
