= Ben Kadi =

- Commune
- Location in Mali
- Coordinates: 13°7′N 5°1′W
- Country: Mali
- Region: Koulikoro Region
- Cercle: Banamba Cercle

Population (1998)
  - Total: 7,606
- Time zone: UTC+0 (GMT)

Ben Kadi is a commune in the Cercle of Banamba in the Koulikoro Region of south-western Mali. The principal town lies at Samakele. In 1998 the commune had a population of 7606.
