= Toukoroba =

- Commune and village
- Location in Mali
- Coordinates: 13°36′30″N 7°2′20″W
- Country: Mali
- Region: Koulikoro Region
- Cercle: Banamba Cercle

Population (2009 census)
  - Total: 12,793
- Time zone: UTC+0 (GMT)

Toukoroba is a rural commune and village in the Cercle of Banamba in the Koulikoro Region of south-western Mali. The commune contains 17 villages.
