= Banamba =

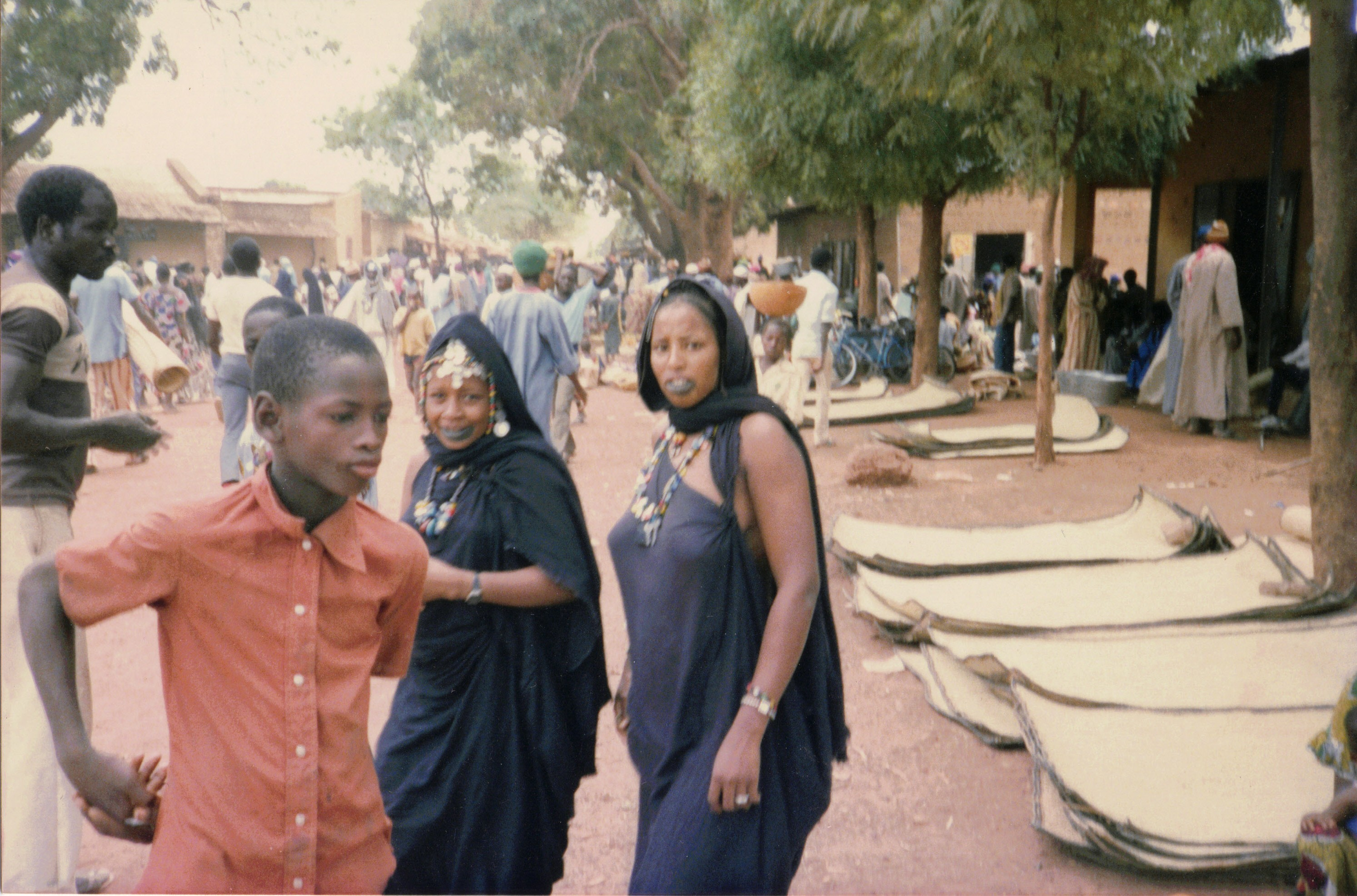
- Banamba market

- Location within Mali
- Coordinates: 13°33′0″N 7°27′0″W
- Country: Mali
- Region: Koulikoro Region
- Cercle: Banamba Cercle
- Elevation: 372 m (1,220 ft)
- Time zone: UTC+0 (GMT)

Banamba is the capital of Banamba Cercle, one of the seven Cercles of the Koulikoro Region of Mali. Its estimated 2008 population is 7000. The town lies due north of the regional capital of Koulikoro, and is connected by a 40 km all-weather road via the town of Sirakorola, about halfway between the two. It is the location of the Lycée Franco-Arabe de Banamba.

== History ==
Banamba was founded by Marka people from Sokolo in the 1840s, but remained a small, unimportant village in the insecure frontier region between the Bamana Empire and Kaarta up until the 1860s. The Toucouleur Empire's conquest of the middle Niger River valley both destabilized the traditional riverine trade routes and opened up a new east-west axis linking Segou with Nioro du Sahel. Banamba was a key center on this new route, and became one of the most important trade towns in the region by the late 1870s. By the 1890s, it was the primary entrepot for the slave trade towards the upper Senegal River valley, as well as an important agricultural center.

In July 1904 the Dakar-Niger railway reached Bamako. Improved access to foreign markets pushed Marka plantation owners around Banamba to intensify grain production by overworking their slaves. In March 1905 slaves began to leave their masters in droves, often returning to homes in the Sikasso and Bougouni cercles. Masters responded by holding slave women and children hostage in Banamba itself. The French governor Fawtier negotiated a compromise, but it only held until the next year. By that time, the colonial government had formally outlawed slavery, and defended the slaves' right to leave. The exodus begun in Banamba spread throughout the region, with hundreds of thousands of slaves leaving their masters.

== Administrative structure ==
Banamba town is the administrative center of Banamba Cercle, which contains nine Communes, including Banamba. The Commune of Banamba contains not only the town itself, but is the administrative center for the following urban Quarters and rural villages:

- Badoucourebougou
- Bakaribougou
- Bamarobougou
- Banamba
- Bougounina
- Dankolo
- Diangalambougou
- Diassani
- Diatouroubougou
- Fadabougou
- Falembougou
- Galo
- Galo-Marka
- Gana
- Kassela
- Kolondialan
- Kouna
- Madina
- N'galamadiby
- N'ganou
- N'ganouba
- Ouleny-Marka
- Ouleny-Peulh
- Sabalibougou
- Sinzena
- Tiontala
- Tomba
- Zambougou
