= Kiban =

- Commune and town
- Location in Mali
- Coordinates: 13°35′N 7°21′W
- Country: Mali
- Region: Koulikoro Region
- Cercle: Banamba Cercle

Population (1998)
  - Total: 9,781
- Time zone: UTC+0 (GMT)

Kiban is a small town and commune in the Cercle of Banamba in the Koulikoro Region of south-western Mali. In 1998 the commune had a population of 9,781.
