= Sebete =

- Commune and town
- Location in Mali
- Coordinates: 14°2′N 7°19′W
- Country: Mali
- Region: Koulikoro Region
- Cercle: Banamba Cercle

Population (1998)
  - Total: 3,185
- Time zone: UTC+0 (GMT)

Sebete is a small town and commune in the Cercle of Banamba in the Koulikoro Region of south-western Mali. As of 1998 the commune had a population of 3185.
