= Toubakoro =

- Commune
- Location in Mali
- Coordinates: 13°53′N 7°11′W
- Country: Mali
- Region: Koulikoro Region
- Cercle: Banamba Cercle

Population (2009 census)
  - Total: 14,239
- Time zone: UTC+0 (GMT)

Toubakoro or Toubacoro is a rural commune in the Cercle of Banamba in the Koulikoro Region of south-western Mali. The commune contains 21 villages.
