= Picramic acid =

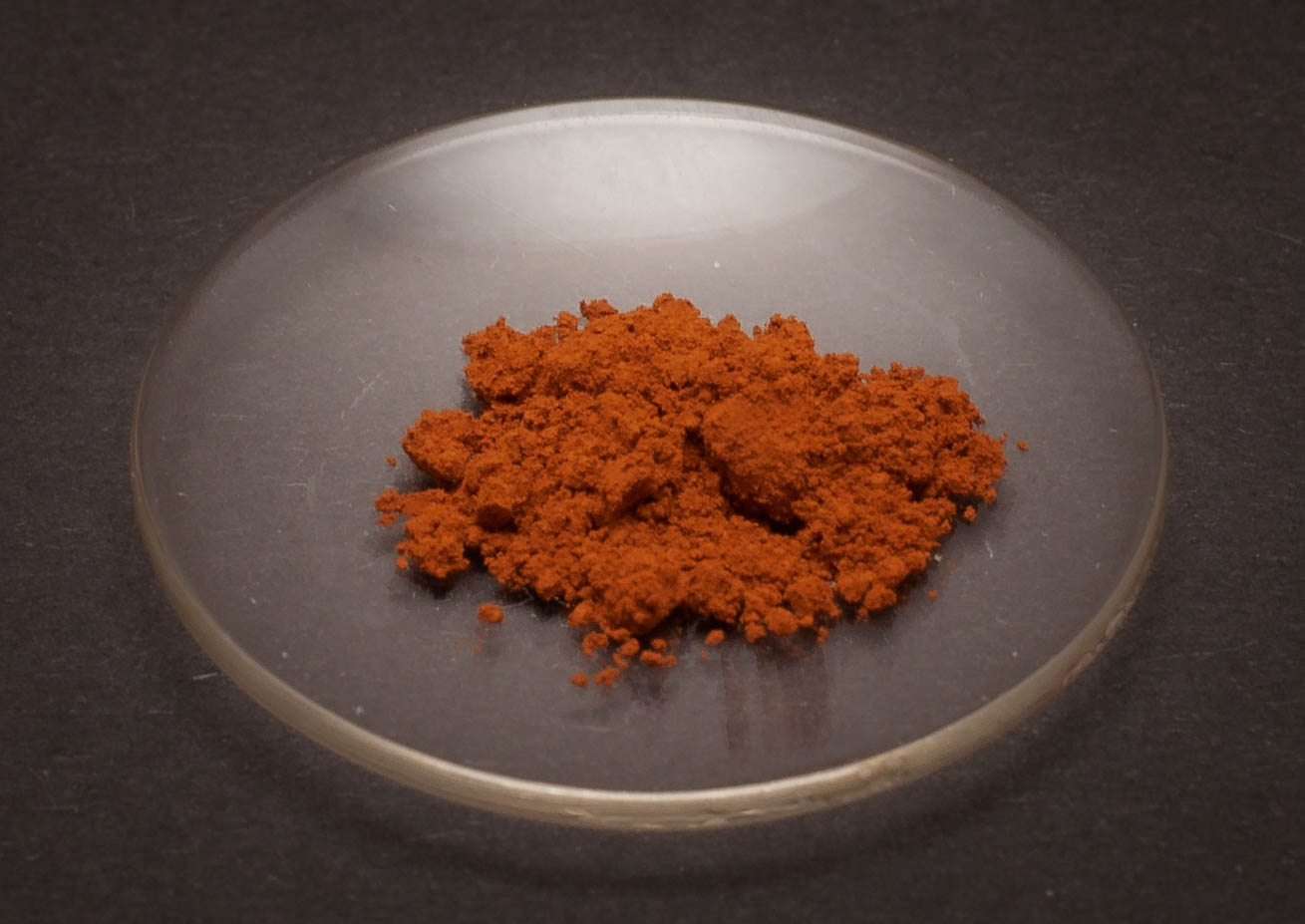

Names
- Preferred IUPAC name 2-Amino-4,6-dinitrophenol

Identifiers
| CAS Number | 96-91-3 |
| 3D model (JSmol) | Interactive image |
| ChEMBL | ChEMBL3183248 |
| ChemSpider | 4103087 |
| ECHA InfoCard | 100.002.314 |
| EC Number | 202-544-6 |
| PubChem CID | 4921319 |
| UNII | 5VDQ7GK8L3 |
| UN number | 3317 |
| CompTox Dashboard (EPA) | DTXSID5024479 |
- InChI: InChI=1S/C6H5N3O5/c7-4-1-3(8(11)12)2-5(6(4)10)9(13)14/h1-2,10H,7H2 Key: QXYMVUZOGFVPGH-UHFFFAOYSA-N; InChI=1S/C6H5N3O5/c7-4-1-3(8(11)12)2-5(6(4)10)9(13)14/h1-2,10H,7H2
- SMILES: c1c(cc(c(c1N)O)[N+](=O)[O-])[N+](=O)[O-]

Properties
| Chemical formula | C_{6}H_{5}N_{3}O_{5} |
| Molar mass | 199.122 g·mol^{−1} |
| Appearance | Brown paste |
| Density | 1.749 g/cm^{3} |
| Melting point | 169 °C (336 °F; 442 K) |
| Boiling point | 386.3 °C (727.3 °F; 659.5 K) |
| log P | 2.4184 |
| Refractive index (n_{D}) | 1.73 |

Hazards
- GHS labelling
| Pictograms | (GHS01: Explosive) (GHS07: Exclamation mark) |
| Signal word | Danger |
| Hazard statements | H201, H302, H312, H332, H412 |
| Precautionary statements | P210, P230, P240, P250, P261, P264, P270, P271, P273, P280, P301+P312, P302+P352, P304+P312, P304+P340, P312, P322, P330, P363, P370+P380, P372, P373, P401, P501 |
| Flash point | 187.5 °C (369.5 °F; 460.6 K) |
- Except where otherwise noted, data are given for materials in their standard state (at 25 °C [77 °F], 100 kPa). verify (what is ?) Infobox references

Picramic acid, also known as 2-amino-4,6-dinitrophenol, is an acid obtained by neutralizing an alcoholic solution of picric acid with ammonium hydroxide. Hydrogen sulfide is then added to the resulting solution, which turns red, yielding sulfur and red crystals. These are the ammonium salts of picramic acid, from which it can be extracted using acetic acid. Picramic acid is explosive and very toxic. It has a bitter taste.

Along with its sodium salt (sodium picramate) it is used in low concentrations in certain hair dyes, such as henna, it is considered safe for this use provided its concentration remains low.
