= Madina Sacko =

- Commune and town
- Location in Mali
- Coordinates: 12°32′30″N 7°2′16″W
- Country: Mali
- Region: Koulikoro Region
- Cercle: Banamba Cercle

Population (1998)
  - Total: 28,550
- Time zone: UTC+0 (GMT)

Madina Sacko is a town and commune in the Cercle of Banamba in the Koulikoro Region of south-western Mali. As of 1998 the commune had a population of 28,550.
