= Duguwolowula =

- Commune
- Location in Mali
- Coordinates: 13°36′19″N 7°20′19″W
- Country: Mali
- Region: Koulikoro Region
- Cercle: Banamba Cercle

Population (1998)
  - Total: 26,374
- Time zone: UTC+0 (GMT)

Duguwolowula is a commune in the Cercle of Banamba in the Koulikoro Region of south-western Mali. The principal town lies at Touba. As of 1998 the commune had a population of 26,374.
