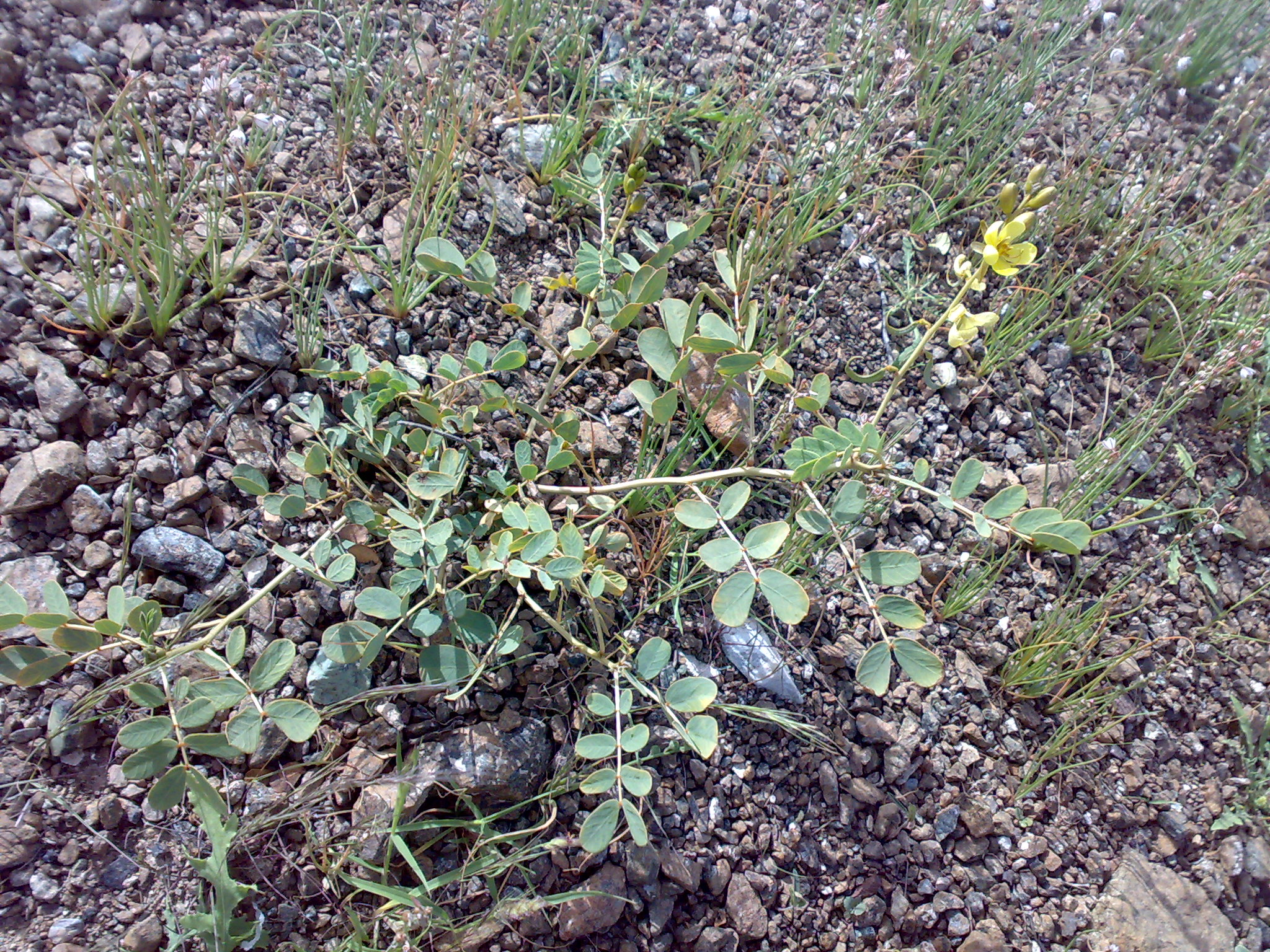
- Senegal senna with flower

Scientific classification
- Kingdom: Plantae
- Clade: Tracheophytes
- Clade: Angiosperms
- Clade: Eudicots
- Clade: Rosids
- Order: Fabales
- Family: Fabaceae
- Subfamily: Caesalpinioideae
- Genus: Senna
- Species: S. italica

Binomial name
- Senna italica Mill.

Subspecies
- S. i. arachoides S. i. italica S. i. micrantha

Synonyms
- Cassia italica (Mill.) Spreng. (1800); Cassia obovata Collad. (1816)

= Senna italica =

Species of legume

Senna italica, the Port Royal senna, Italian senna, or Senegal senna is a legume tree in the genus Senna. It is recognized by many other common names based on the regions it grows in. In India, it is used to produce a powder for treating hair-related diseases which is known as “neutral henna”. Whereas, in some parts of the world, this species (along with Cassia senna) is cultivated for the leaves which yield the drug senna, known commonly as Senna glycoside, which in turn is the base for a laxative. Senegal senna is easily distinguishable through its many distinctive features. There are 3 subspecies of this plant based on the size of the inflorescence and the length of the petiole. The subspecies are italica, micrantha, and arachoides. In many regions, this plant is cultivated commercially and medicinally.

== Description ==
Individuals of this species are deciduous, perennial herbs, and shrubs up to 60 cm tall. The plant is woody throughout. Taproots are present in this plant. Stems are solid, usually less than 2 m tall. These stems or young twigs are glabrous or sparsely glabrous and sparsely to densely hairy. This species has compound leaves with pinnate veination. There are approximately 4-6 leaflets per leaf, which are arranged spirally and alternately. The leaflets are elliptical, and shortly hairy on both sides. There is a small reddish gland between each leaflet pair on the rhachis of arachoides subspecies. The stipules usually have lanceolate-triangular shape. They are approximately 3–9 mm long and early spreading –deflexed.

=== Flowers and fruit ===
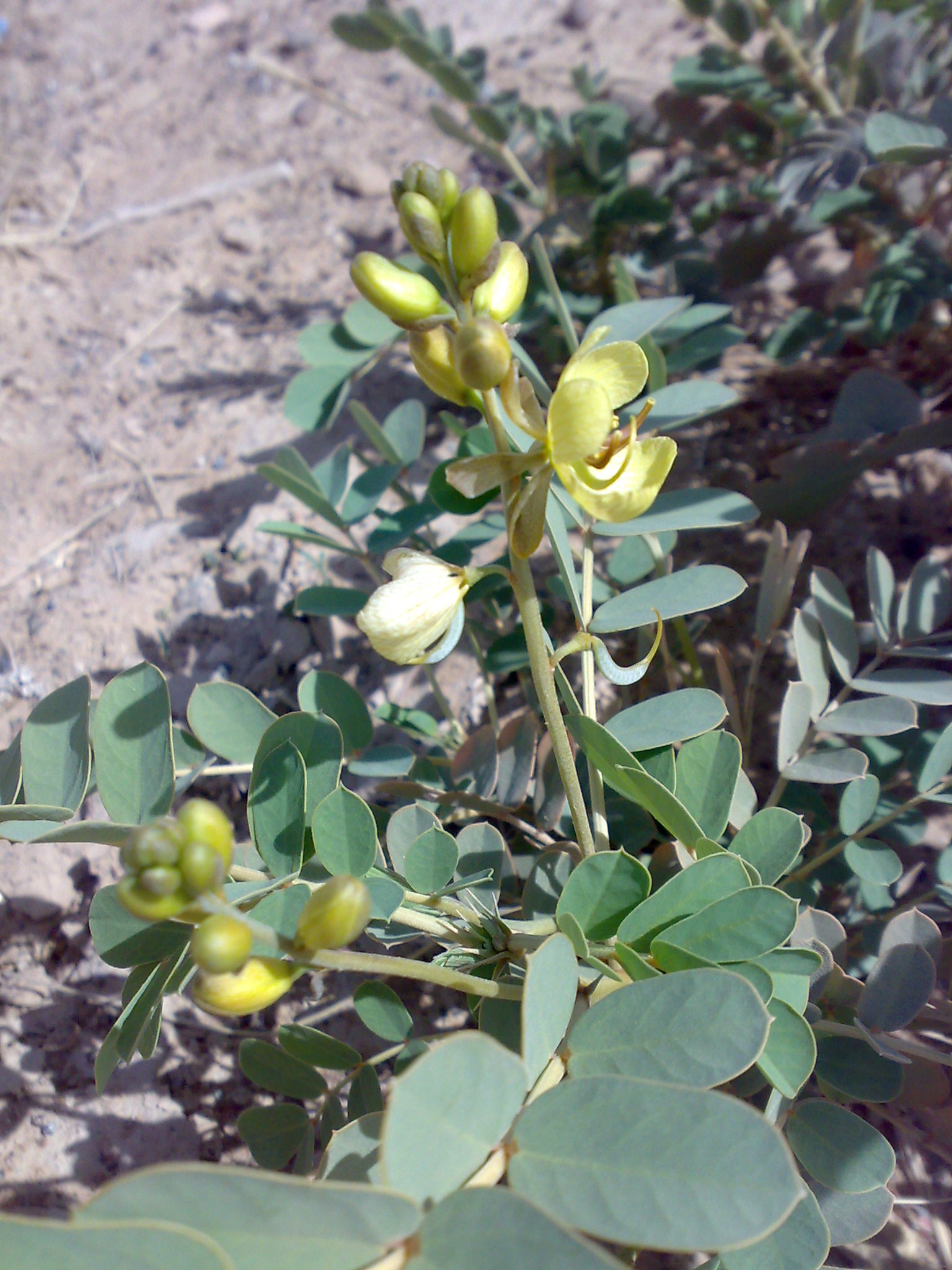
Inflorescence of Senna italica

Flowering usually takes place during rainy season, but flowers can appear throughout the year in moist conditions. Senna italica is usually propagated by seeds. Treating the seed by abrasion improves germination. Flowers of Senna italica, are actinomorphic and the inflorescence takes the form of axillary racemes, which are about 2–25 cm long. Petals of these flowers are usually yellow or orange in color, up to 13 mm long and are of obovate shape. Rhombic to ovate bracts are conspicuously present, but very small in size (up to 5mm long). The flower of Senegal senna is bisexual, zygomorphic and 5-merous. It usually has 10 stamens (lower 2 are the largest; 5 are medium-sized; 3 are short and sterile), Style up to 6 mm long and a superior ovary with short and stiff hair. Senegal senna has freely dehiscent fruits. Fruits are oblong or ellipsoidal; they are strongly curved, falcate, bent or lunate shaped. The fruit may contain as many as 11 seeds. The seeds have an elliptical line or depression and are wrinkled or rugose. Seeds are usually of olive, green or black color.

== Distribution and habitat ==
Senegal senna is native to African countries from Cape Verde east to Somalia and south to South Africa. It is also native to Asia, from the Middle East to Iran, Iraq, Pakistan and India to Sri Lanka. Later, this plant has been introduced to Caribbean and Venezuela. This plant is also introduced to the United States and is currently located at New York Botanical Garden. The subspecies italica is often found in West Africa, North Africa, Sudan, the Horn of Africa and from Yemen to Northwest India, but it is naturalized in some parts of South Africa. Subspecies micrantha is mostly seen from Southern Ethiopia and Somalia southwards to Namibia, Botswana, Zimbabwe and Mozambique. Micrantha has been introduced to India too. Arachoides are limited to Namibia, Botswana and South Africa.

== Ecology ==
Senna italica can be seen in grassland of the drier regions of tropical Africa, from sea level up to 1850m altitude. Usually, it is found close to streams and in sandy and disturbed habitats such as waste places about towns and country dwellings, abandoned gardens, roadsides, etc. This plant is adapted to warm temperature and may grow throughout the year.

Senna italica is known as the host of the root lesion nematode. Serious termite attacks are observed during perennial cultivation.

== Uses ==
The leaves, pods and seeds of Senna italica are mostly used in traditional medicine. In Malawi, root infusion is used to treat diarrhea in infants.

In West African languages, this tree is called mbali or balibali in Bambara, and laïdur in Wolof.

Reports on the uses of Senna italica are contradictory. In East Africa, it is eaten by most livestock, whereas in West Africa, it is often avoided. In Sahel regions, young seeds are eaten as snacks or a vegetable. On the other hand, the seeds are smoked in Mauritania. In India, the leaves are used as a hair treatment called neutral henna or “blonde henna”. This treatment coats the hair so that it looks glossy and thick for several weeks, but instead of being completely neutral, "neutral henna" appears to have a yellowish impact on hair rather than the reddish one produced by henna. Fruit production of this plant is generally avoided, as their sennoside content is low.

== Production and international trade ==
The dried leaves and pods of Senegal senna are traded for medicinal uses. Dried, powdered leaves are traded internationally from Egypt or India as hair conditioner. Senna italica has lost its importance, as Senna alexandrina is the most popular for medicinal purposes. However, it is used widely within domestic markets for producing a mild laxative.

== Genetic resources and breeding ==
There are collections of Senna italica in the gene banks in Palestine, the United Kingdom and Namibia. By far, there is no threat of genetic erosion. Selection and breeding of this plant is not attempted, but it would be worthwhile if commercial production is envisaged.
