= Boron, Mali =

Boron
- Commune and town
- Location in Mali
- Coordinates: 14°0′27″N 7°30′26″W
- Country: Mali
- Region: Koulikoro Region
- Cercle: Banamba Cercle

Population (1998)
  - Total: 32,250
- Time zone: UTC+0 (GMT)

Boron is a town and commune in the Cercle of Banamba in the Koulikoro Region of south-western Mali. As of 1998 the commune had a population of 32,250.
