= Boron (surname) =

Boron or Borón is a surname. Notable people with the surname include:

- Atilio Borón (born 1943), Argentine sociologist
- Kathrin Boron (born 1969), German rower
- Robert de Boron, French medieval poet
- Walter Boron (born 1949), American scientist
