= Vadhu Pravesha =

Hindu ritual of bride welcoming

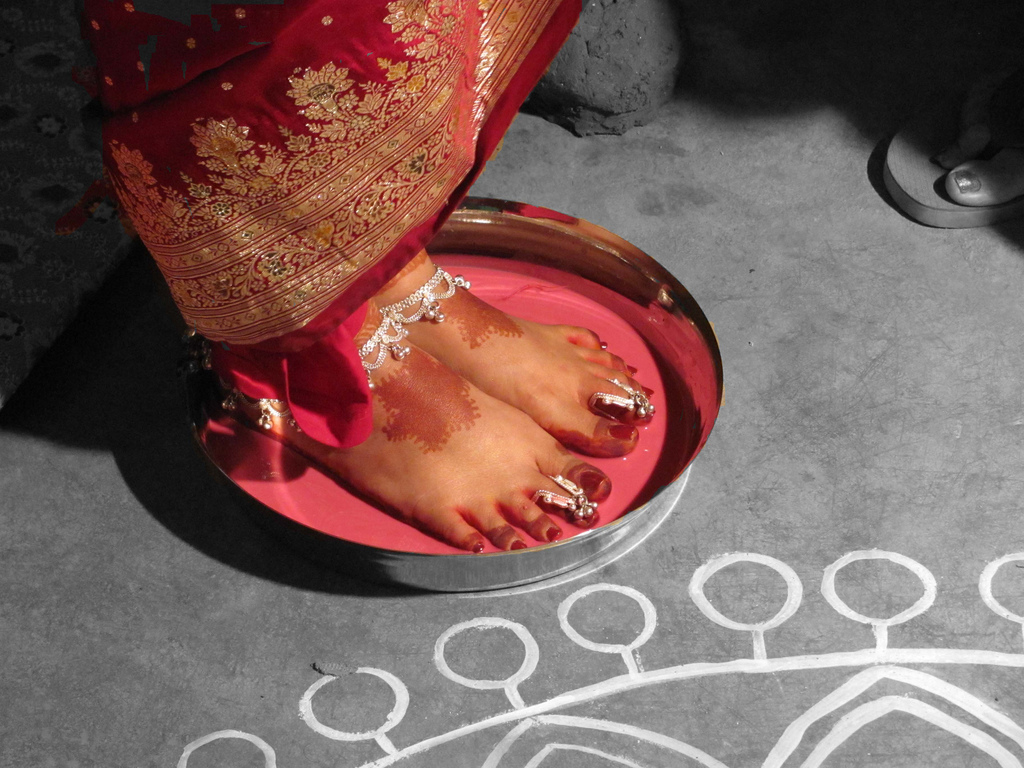
Bou Boron- A new bride stands on a flat plate containing a mixture of alta (lac dye) and milk.

A man carries his newly wed wife into his house.

Vadhu Pravesha (Sanskrit: वधूप्रवेश, romanized: Vadhūpraveśa) is a Hindu ritual in India performed to welcome the bride to the house of her new husband.

== Description ==
In the ancient period, a wife would symbolically be taken to her new house with her husband in a chariot, where he would ask her to bear him sons and attend to his parents and property.

=== Bou Boron ===
In Bengali tradition, the women of the house pour water on the ground beneath their vehicle when they alight. Then the bride stands on a wooden square structure. Most often the groom's elder brother's wife holds a plate containing lac and milk. Durba is spread on the bride's forehead as a blessing. A pot full of rice is placed in front of the bride's feet she gently kicks. This symbolizes the wish and belief of having so much rice that it can even be kicked off. Then the bride puts her feet on a plate of alta (a traditional cosmetic used to color feet). Having imprinted the soles of her feet thus, she is taken into the house. The elders of the house bless the newlyweds.
