= Banamba Cercle =

Coordinates: 13°45′N 7°20′W

Banamba
- Cercle
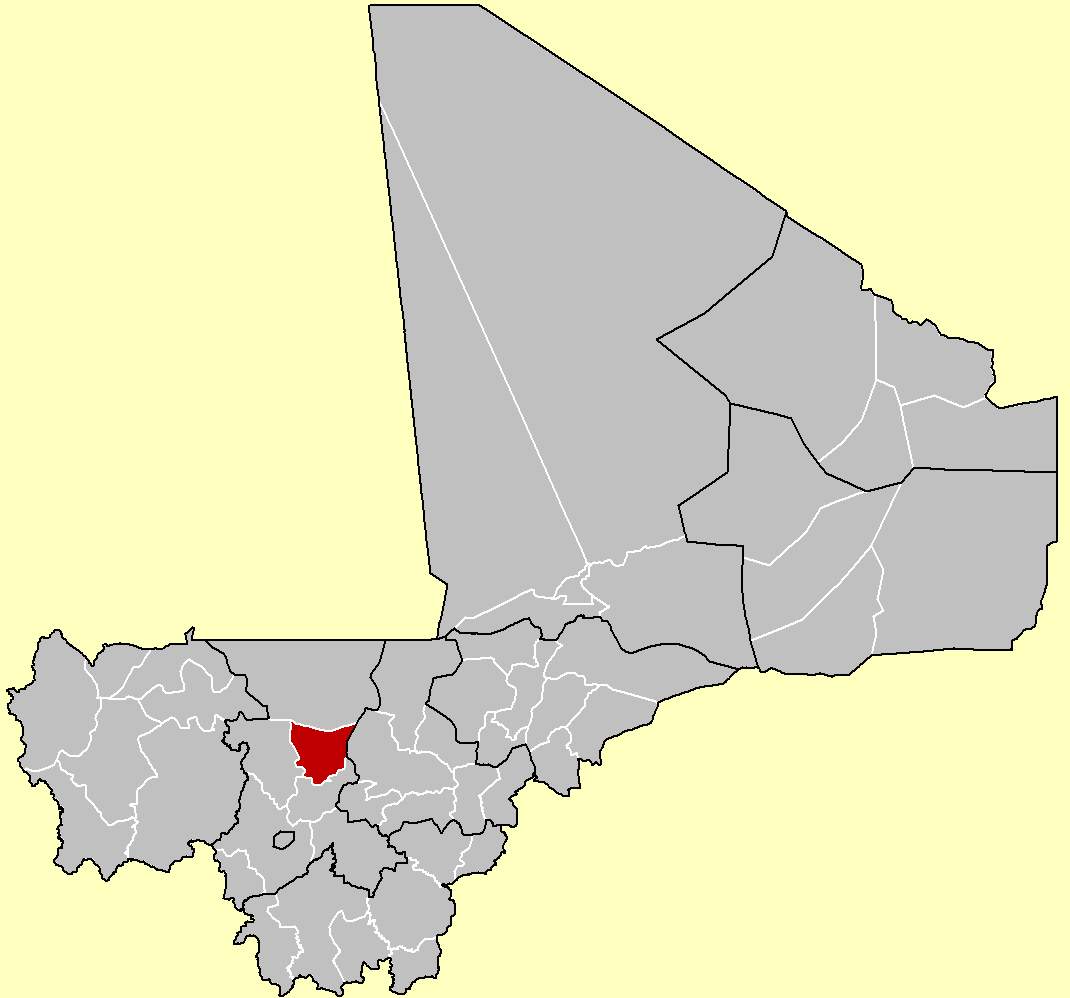
- Location of Banamba Cercle in Mali
- Country: Mali
- Region: Koulikoro Region
- Admin HQ (Chef-lieu): Banamba

Area
  - Total: 7,500 km^{2} (2,900 sq mi)

Population (2009 census)
  - Total: 190,235
  - Density: 25/km^{2} (66/sq mi)
- Time zone: UTC+0 (GMT)

Banamba Cercle is an administrative subdivision of the Koulikoro Region of Mali. Its seat is the town of Banamba, which is also its largest settlement. It lies at the center east of the region.

Banamba Cercle is home to primarily Bambara farmers, and formed part of the pre-colonial Bambara Empire. The Cercle falls largely in the dryer Sahel region, especially in its north, where the population is mostly Fula and Maure pastoralists.

The Banamba Cercle is divided into nine rural communes:

- Banamba (administrative seat and largest town)
- Ben Kadi
- Boron
- Duguwolowula
- Kiban
- Madina Sacko
- Sebete
- Toubacoro
- Toukoroba
