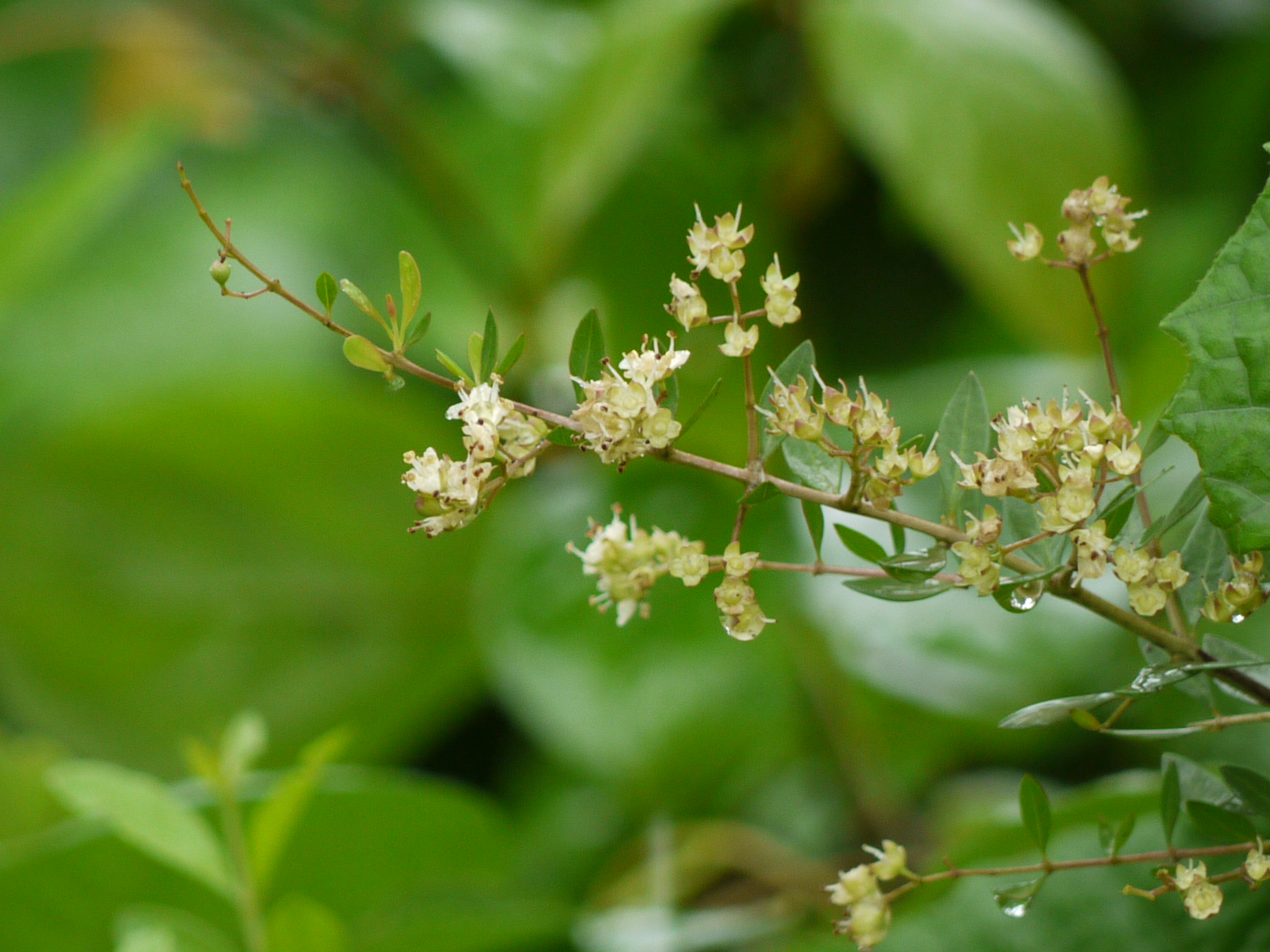

Conservation status
- Least Concern (IUCN 3.1)

Scientific classification
- Kingdom: Plantae
- Clade: Embryophytes
- Clade: Tracheophytes
- Clade: Spermatophytes
- Clade: Angiosperms
- Clade: Eudicots
- Clade: Rosids
- Order: Myrtales
- Family: Lythraceae
- Subfamily: Lythroideae
- Genus: Lawsonia; L.
- Species: L. inermis

Binomial name
- Lawsonia inermis L.

Synonyms
- Alcanna spinosa (L.) Gaertn.; Casearia multiflora Spreng.; Lawsonia alba Lam. nom. illeg.; Lawsonia speciosa L.; Lawsonia spinosa L.; Rotantha combretoides Baker

= Lawsonia inermis =

Species of tree

Lawsonia inermis, also known as hina, the henna tree, the mignonette tree, and the Egyptian privet, is a flowering plant and one of the only two species of the genus Lawsonia, with the other being Lawsonia odorata. It is used as a traditional medicinal plant. The species is named after the Scottish physician Isaac Lawson, a good friend of Linnaeus.

== Description ==
Henna is a tall shrub or small tree, standing 1.8 to 7.6 m tall (6 to 25 ft). It is glabrous and multi-branched, with spine-tipped branchlets. The leaves grow opposite each other on the stem. They are glabrous, sub-sessile, elliptical, and lanceolate (long and wider in the middle; average dimensions are 1.5–5.0 cm x 0.5–2 cm or .6–2 in x 0.2–0.8 in), acuminate (tapering to a long point), and have depressed veins on the dorsal surface. Henna flowers have four sepals and a 2 mm (0.079 in) calyx tube, with 3 mm (0.12 in) spread lobes. Its petals are ovate, with white or red stamens found in pairs on the rim of the calyx tube. The ovary is four-celled, 5 mm (0.20 in) long, and erect. Henna fruits are small, brownish capsules, 4–8 mm (0.16–0.31 in) in diameter, with 32–49 seeds per fruit, and open irregularly into four splits.

== Distribution and habitat ==
The henna plant is native to northern and eastern Africa, Asia and northern Australia, in semi-arid zones and tropical areas.

== Cultivation ==
It produces the most dye when grown in temperatures between 35 and 45 °C (95 and 113 °F). During the onset of precipitation intervals, the plant grows rapidly, putting out new shoots. Growth subsequently slows. The leaves gradually yellow and fall during prolonged dry or cool intervals. It does not thrive where minimum temperatures are below 11 °C (52 °F). Temperatures below 5 °C (41 °F) will kill the henna plant.

== Dye ==
Its dried leaves are the source of the dye henna used to dye skin, hair and fingernails, as well as fabrics including silk, wool and leather. To make dye, only the leaves that grow in the lower part of the plant are taken, otherwise their coloring capacity will be too great.

Said leaves also have antifungal and antiseptic properties.

== Medicinal uses ==
Henna contains chemicals such as lawsone. Preliminary studies indicate that lawsone, and henna leaves generally, have antioxidant, antibacterial, anti-inflammatory, and potentially tumor suppressing properties. However, the safety and efficacy of such chemicals in humans has not yet been established.

Henna is known to be dangerous to people with glucose-6-phosphate dehydrogenase deficiency (G6PD deficiency), which is more common in males than females. Infants and children of particular ethnic groups, mainly from the Middle East and North Africa, are especially vulnerable.

== Image gallery ==
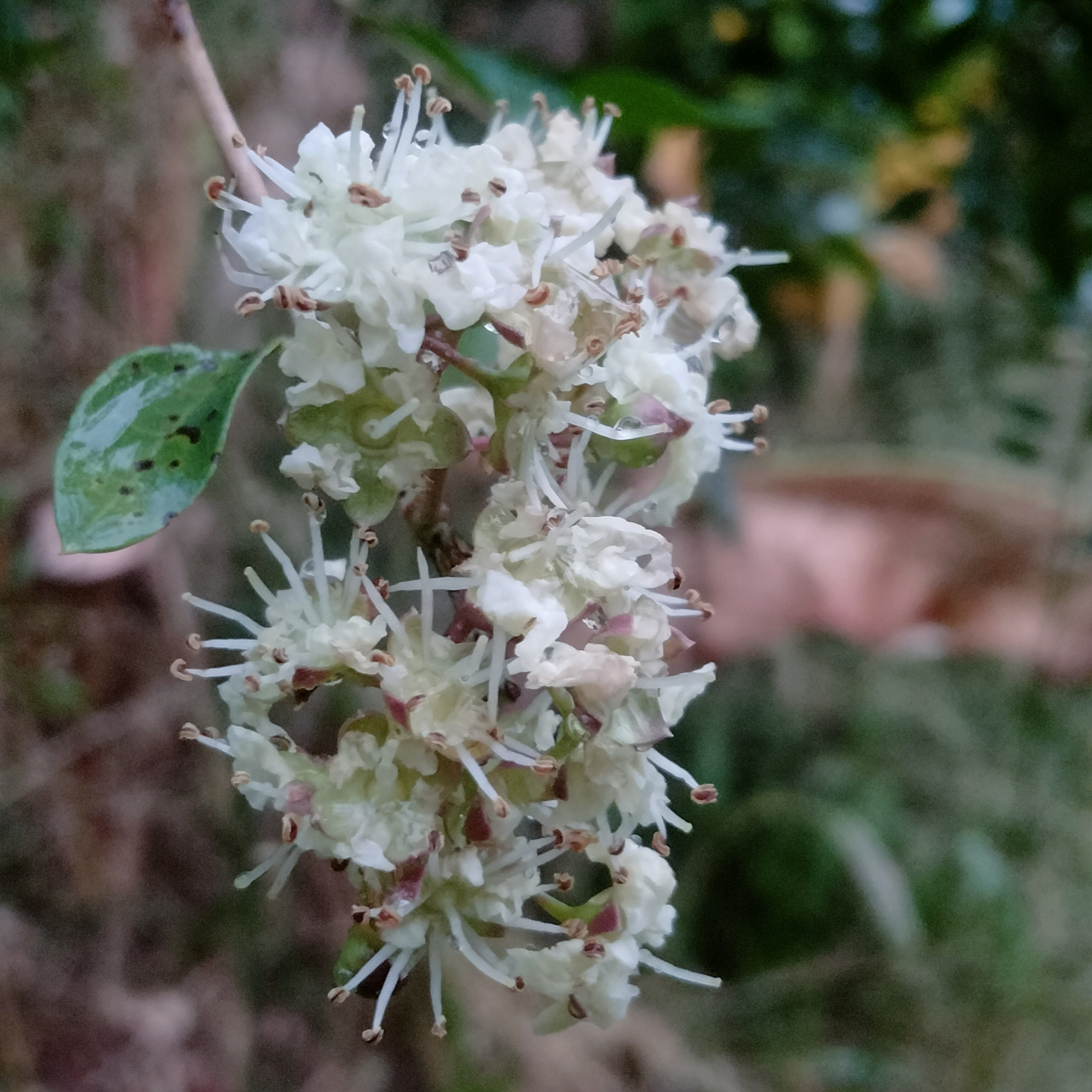
Henna flowers

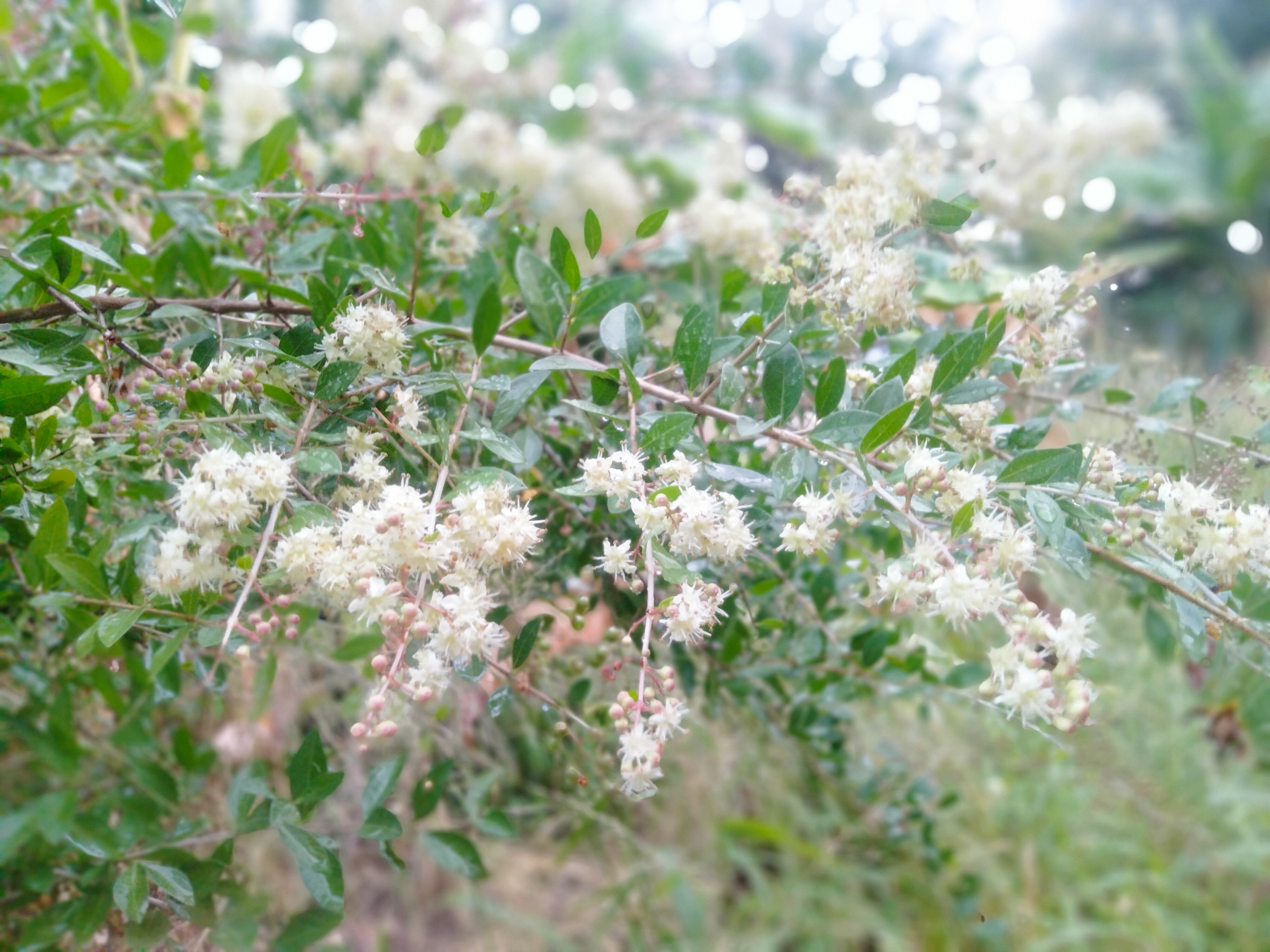
Henna flowers

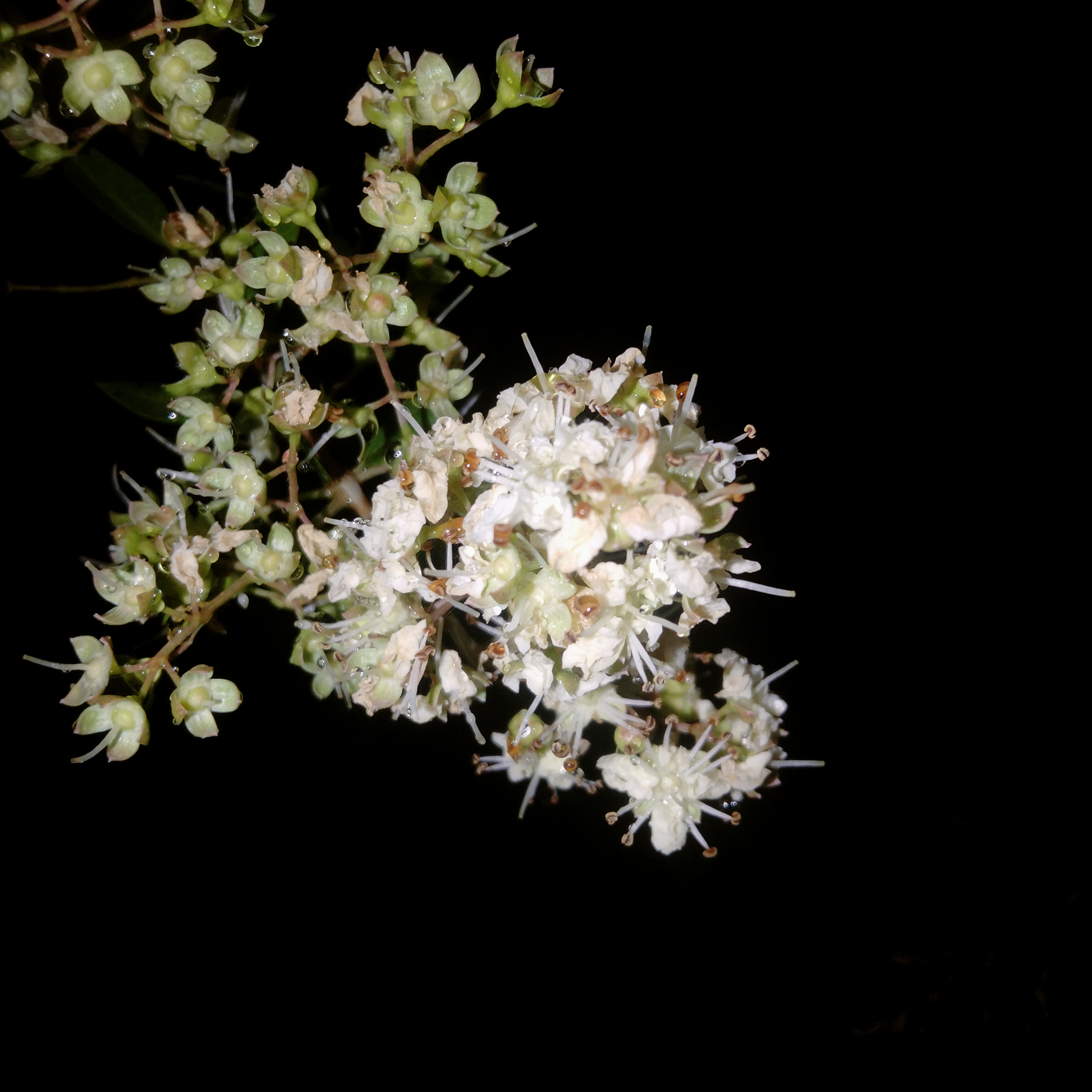
Henna flowers- night view

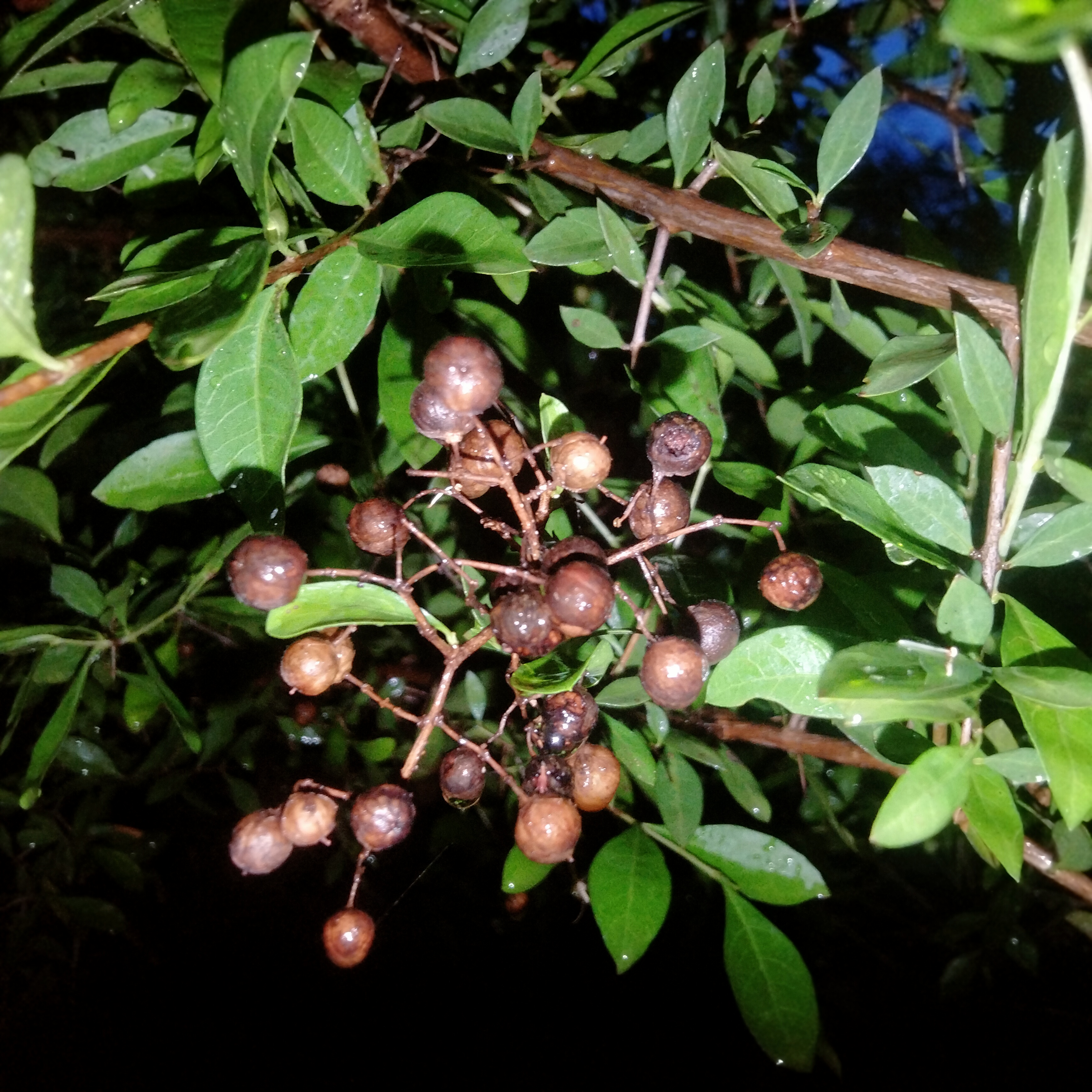
Henna fruits
