= Walima =

Banquet in Islamic weddings

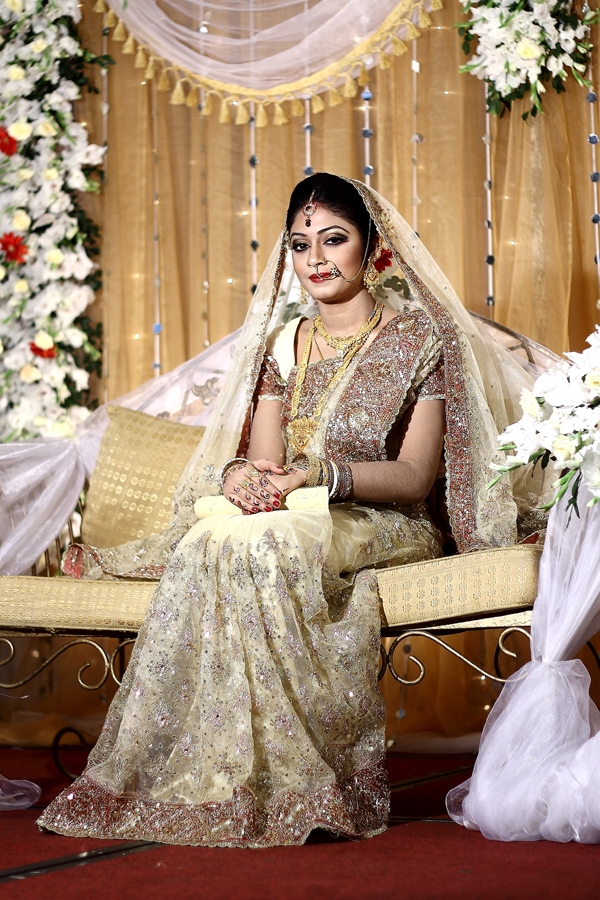
A Bengali Muslim bride on her Bou Bhat, the Bengali version of Walima

Walima (Arabic: وليمة, romanized: Walīma) is the second of the two parts of an Islamic wedding. It is the wedding reception banquet and is performed after the nikah (marriage ceremony). It designates a feast in Arabic. The walima is used as a symbol to show domestic happiness in the household post-marriage, and to announce the marriage openly for recognition of the new couple. The walima generally takes place in the locale where the newly married couple is to reside. While cultural practices may differ, marriage expenses and costs of the walima are generally borne by the groom or his family. While it is widely regarded as a Sunnah (a recommended practice), it is not an obligatory ritual. Scholars agree that the Walima is highly encouraged for those who are able to afford it, as it serves as a public announcement of the marriage and fosters community celebration. While the Walima holds cultural and religious value, it is not required for every marriage, and its observance can vary depending on personal, familial, or financial circumstances.

Over time, the Walima has evolved to reflect changing social norms and personal preferences. In contemporary weddings, couples often blend traditional Walima practices with modern trends. This can be seen in personalized decorations, themed receptions, and fashionable attire that aligns with current wedding styles. The essence of the Walima celebrating the union of two people and sharing the joy with family and friends-remains, but the form it takes can vary widely across different cultures and communities.

== Debate about the time of walima ==
Scholars have different views on what the correct time of walima is. The timing varies by culture and opinion; for example some believe it should take place:

1. At the time of the marriage contract,
2. After the marriage contract and before the consummation of marriage,
3. At the time of the wedding procession (bride leaving for her husband's house). [Ibn Hajar, Fath al-Bari, 9/287]

However, the majority of the scholars (jumhur) are of the opinion that walima is a meal that is prepared after the marriage has been consummated. This was the practice of the Islamic prophet Muhammad, as explicitly mentioned in one narration.

Scholars are in agreement that the walima must be organized, hosted, and paid for by the groom's side.

== Translation notes ==
Walima in literal translation means "to assemble" and is used to describe an assembly or party celebrating a wedding. Walima is essentially interchangeable with the English terms "wedding reception" and "celebration" (when held to celebrate a marriage). The word walima is generally interchangeable with the various terms in other languages/cultures that essentially mean to assemble for the purposes of celebrating a marriage. While it is an Arabic term, it is not necessarily a term reserved for Muslims per se, as the word simply describes an event that celebrates a new wedding.
