= Bengali wedding =

A Bengali wedding may refer to:

- Bengali Hindu wedding, Hindu marriage in Bengali culture
- Bengali Muslim wedding, Muslim marriage in Bengali culture
