= Shagorana =

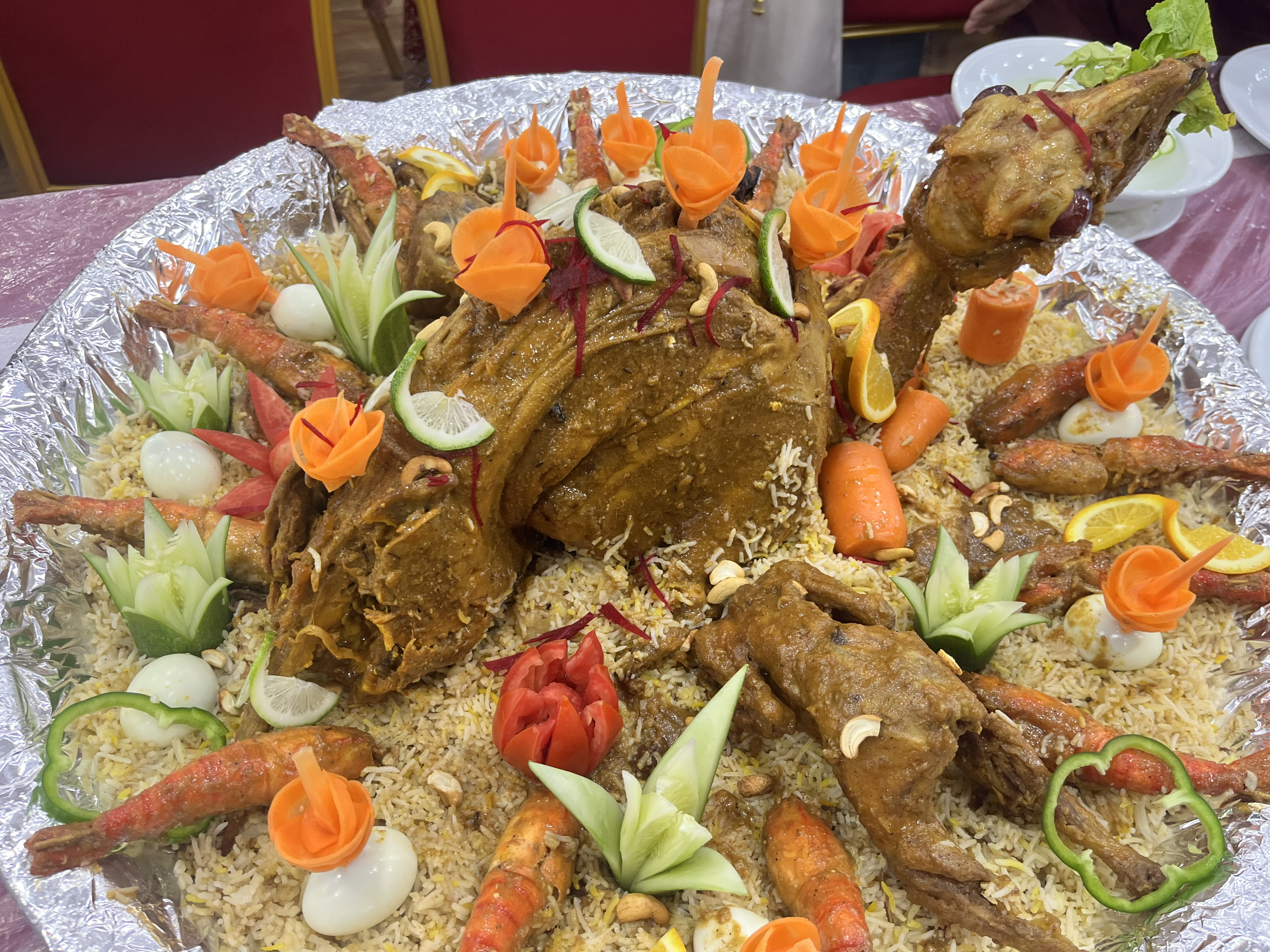
- A Shagorana platter served at a Bangladeshi wedding featuring a whole roasted goat, lobsters, chicken roasts, eggs, aromatic polao, and decorative cut salads
- Alternative names: Shagorana Thala; Khodorer Thala; Sodori Khana; Shukrana Bhaat
- Course: Main
- Place of origin: Bangladesh
- Region or state: Bangladesh; United Kingdom (particularly among Bangladeshi diaspora)
- Associated cuisine: Bangladeshi
- Main ingredients: Polao or biryani, whole roasted chicken or goat, eggs, kebabs

Shagorana aka Shagorana Thala, Khodorer Thala or Sodori Khana (Bengali: সাগরানা, সাগরানা থালা, খদরের থালা, ছদরি খানা) is both a traditional dish and the unique ceremonial custom of its presentation, observed by the Muslim community in Bangladesh, and typically served to the groom at a wedding reception. This custom involves presenting a large, lavish thala (platter) featuring a variety of dishes arranged artistically. The centerpiece is typically a whole roasted goat or a whole roasted chicken or Durus. The centerpiece is surrounded by a diverse assortment of traditional side dishes, including Polao or Biryani, kebab, rezala, and korma, eggs. The platter is further garnished with decorations of carved fruit and vegetable salad.

Shagorana is a hallmark culinary tradition in Bangladeshi weddings, deeply integrated into its folk food culture and customs. It embodies Bengali hospitality and the profound respect shown to the groom. Traditionally, the bride's family presents this distinctive platter to warmly welcome and honour the groom.

== Etymology ==
Author and researcher Abdul Haq Choudhury, in his work Chattogramer Samaj O Sanskritir Ruprekha (1980), highlights that the term Shukrana Bhaat evolved through common usage, becoming distorted into 'Sagorana Bhaat' and eventually shortened to 'Sagorana'.

The word 'Shukrana' (or 'Shokrana') is fundamentally an Arabic-Persian term meaning gratitude or thankfulness. And the Bengali word, Bhaat means rice. Therefore, the term Shokrana/Shukrana Bhaat translates to a feast or meal held for the purpose of expressing gratitude or thanks. This practice shares conceptual similarities with the observance of Thanksgiving Day in the Western world.

The ceremony is held as a token of offering good wishes and seek blessings from Almighty upon the couple's new life together, marking the joyous transition from the end of their unmarried lives to the beginning of a shared one.

== History and Socio-cultural Significance ==
From a historical perspective, this custom has served as an important tradition for establishing social bonds and goodwill between the families of both the bride and the groom. The food at the Shagorana platter has traditionally been arranged in such a way that it becomes a participatory family and social event rather than being solely the groom's personal meal.

Zamir Ahmed, in his book Fenir Itihas (2004), states:

অতঃপর বর যাত্রী বা বৈরাতীদের আপ্যায়ন; প্রথমে শরবত এবং পরে খাবার পরিবেশন করা হয়। বিশেষত দুলহার সামনে দেয়া হয় বড় রেকাবী ভর্তি সাগরানা যাতে ৮/১০ জন এক সংগে খেতে পারে। আস্ত একটা মোরগের রোস্ট (দুরুজ) রেকাবীতে থাকে। বরের বন্ধু বান্ধব ও কনের ভগ্নিপতি ও ছোট ভাই বোনেরা কাড়াকাড়ি করে রোষ্ট খেয়ে আনন্দ উপভোগ করে।

—Zamir Ahmed
Translation:

Therefore, the groom's party, or Bairatis, are entertained; first with Sharbat and then with food. Especially in front of the groom is placed a large platter full of Shagorana from which 8 to 10 people can eat together. A roast of a whole chicken (Durus or roast) is kept on the platter. The groom's friends, the bride’s brothers-in-law, and younger siblings joyously compete to eat the roast.

From a cultural perspective, Shagarana is a symbol of the bride's family's highest hospitality and respect shown towards the groom. The grand organization of this ritual and the abundance of food are also a means for the bride's family to demonstrate their aristocracy and social standing.

== See more ==
- Bengali Muslims
- Eid Anondo Michil
