= Bengali Hindu wedding =

Bengali variant of Hindu wedding

Bengali Hindu wedding (Bengali: বাঙালি হিন্দু বিবাহ) refers to the traditional Bengali cultural wedding, typically conducted with Vedic (Hindu) rites and rituals native to the Bengal region of the Indian subcontinent that have been practised for centuries.

== Pre-wedding rituals ==
=== Aiburobhaat ===
Aiburobhaat is a tradition in Bengali culture, particularly significant for unmarried young adults on the verge of marriage. This ritual, which combines Aiburo (unmarried individual) and Bhat (rice), marks the last meal of rice consumed by the bride or groom before they enter married life. The event celebrates love and care, with parents and relatives making significant efforts to organise an elaborate feast in honour of the occasion.

Fish plays a prominent role in the ceremony. From the rich doi maach to the flavourful maacher jhol, fish dishes are selected and prepared to delight the guests. These dishes showcase the culinary heritage of Bengal and hold deep symbolic meaning. A notable part of the ritual involves presenting the fish head to the bride or groom, who takes a small bite before passing it on to a sibling. This act symbolises the transfer of marital blessings and is believed to bring good fortune, with the hope that the sibling will soon find a suitable partner.

Aiburobhaat, with its fish preparations and traditions, captures the essence of Bengali culture and the transition from single life to marriage.

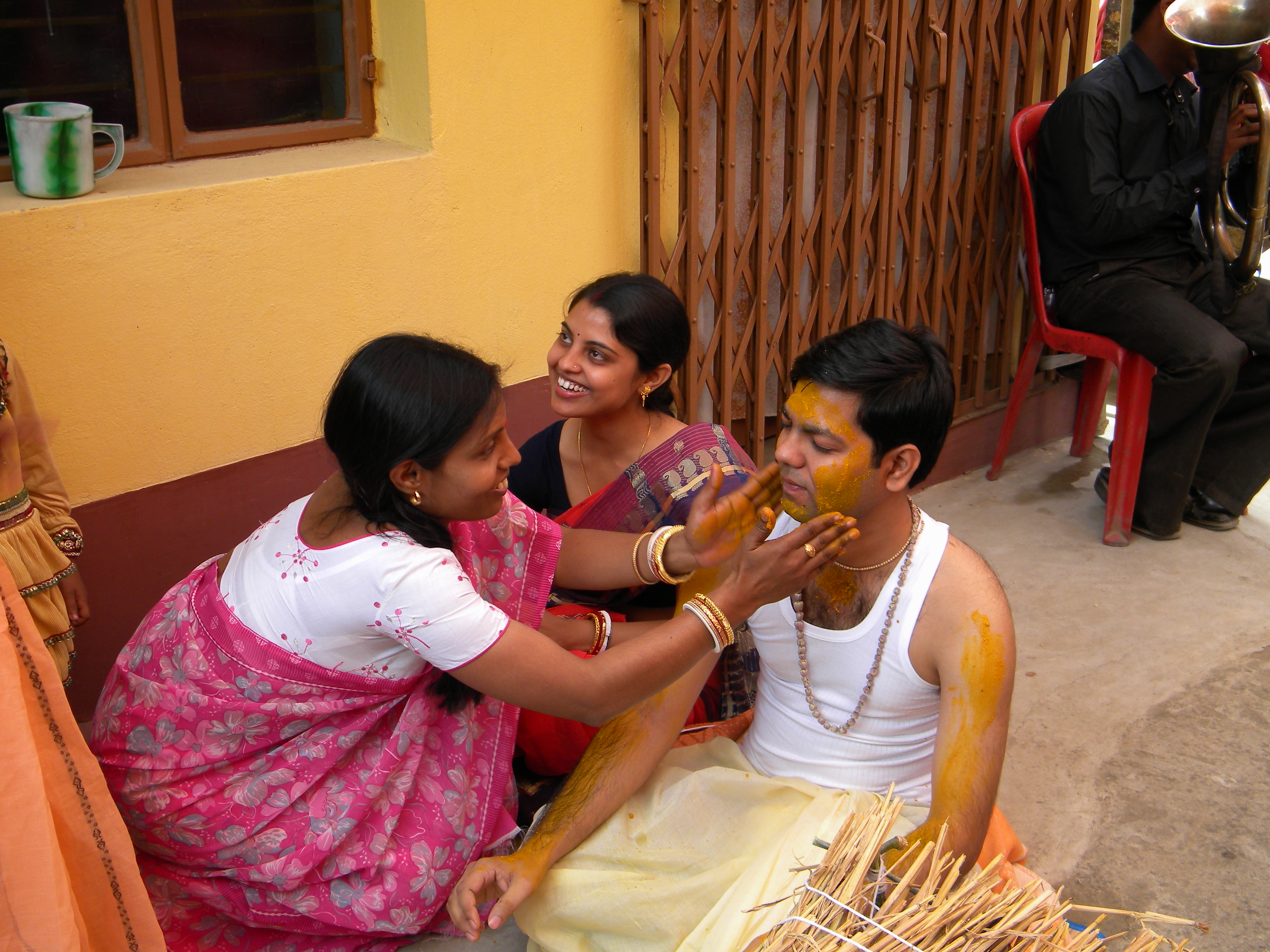
Gaye Holud ceremony of Bengali groom

=== Gaye Holud ===
Gaye Holud (Bengali: গায়ে হলুদ), meaning "applying turmeric to the body", is a traditional Bengali pre-wedding ritual where the groom's family, without the groom, visits the bride's house on the morning of the ceremony to celebrate and perform the turmeric ceremony. Both the bride's and groom's families apply turmeric paste during their respective Gaye Holud ceremonies on the wedding day. This tradition symbolises purification and marks the beginning of their new journey together.

== Main wedding rituals ==
=== Mala badal ===
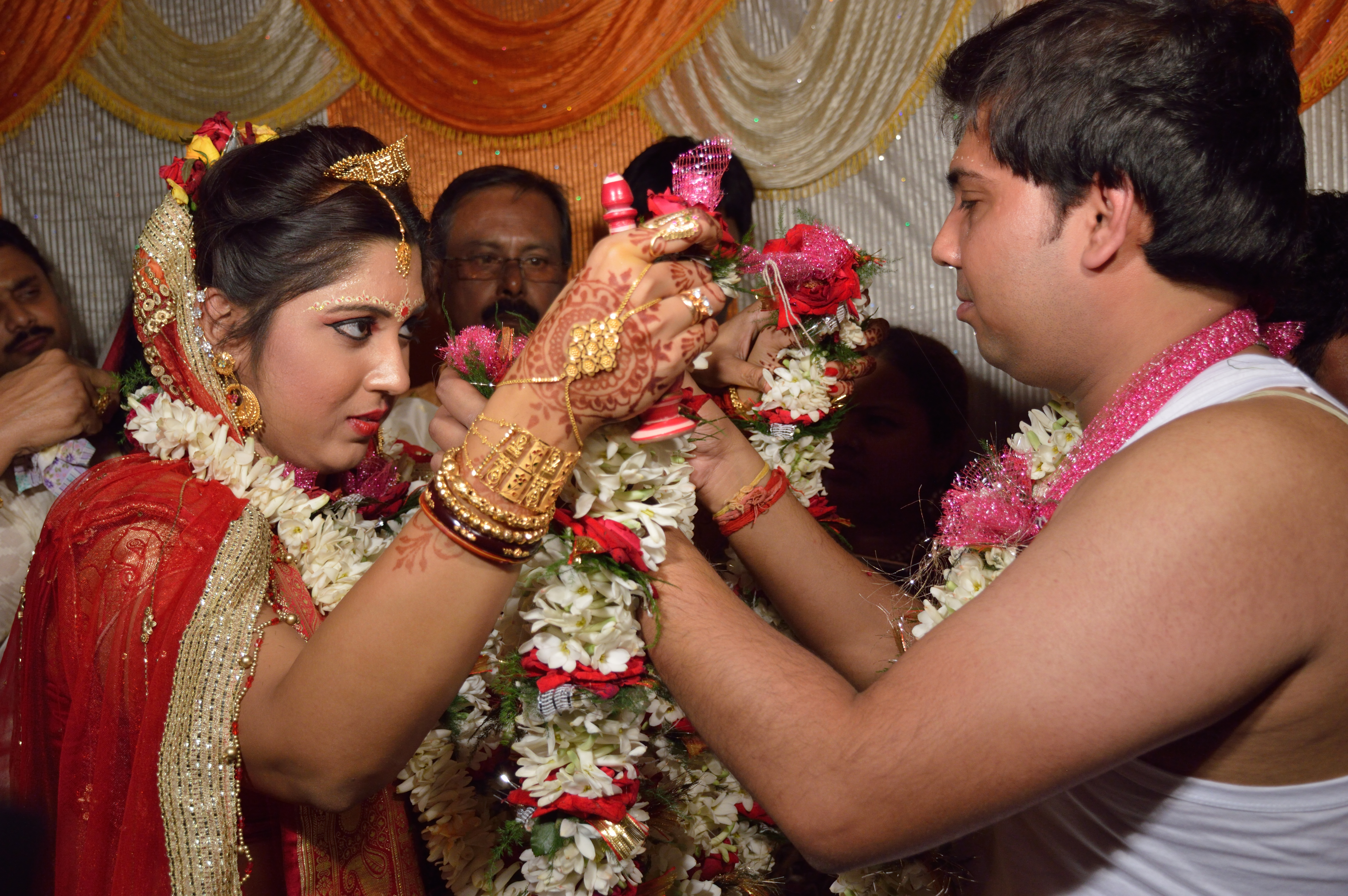
Mala Badal – Bengali Hindu Wedding

Mala Badal (Bengali: মালা বদল) is a significant ritual in traditional Bengali weddings, where the bride and groom exchange flower garlands. This ceremony traditionally marks the first time the bride and groom see each other, reflecting the custom of keeping the couple apart until the wedding. The Mala Badal symbolises their acceptance of one another and serves as a moment of connection during the wedding ceremony.

=== Saat Paake Ghora ===
Saat Paake Ghora, also known as Saat Paak, is a crucial ritual in a traditional Bengali wedding, symbolising the bond between the bride and groom. The ritual begins with the bride, seated on a low wooden stool called pidi, being gently lifted by her brothers and taken around the groom in seven complete circles. This act signifies the couple becoming securely intertwined, reflecting their commitment for life. In the Agni ritual, the couple takes seven rounds around the sacred fire (Yagna), reaffirming their vows. Each circle represents a promise for a prosperous and harmonious life together. The ritual is an important moment in the wedding ceremony, representing the couple's joint commitment and unity as they embark on their shared journey.

=== Khoi Porano ===
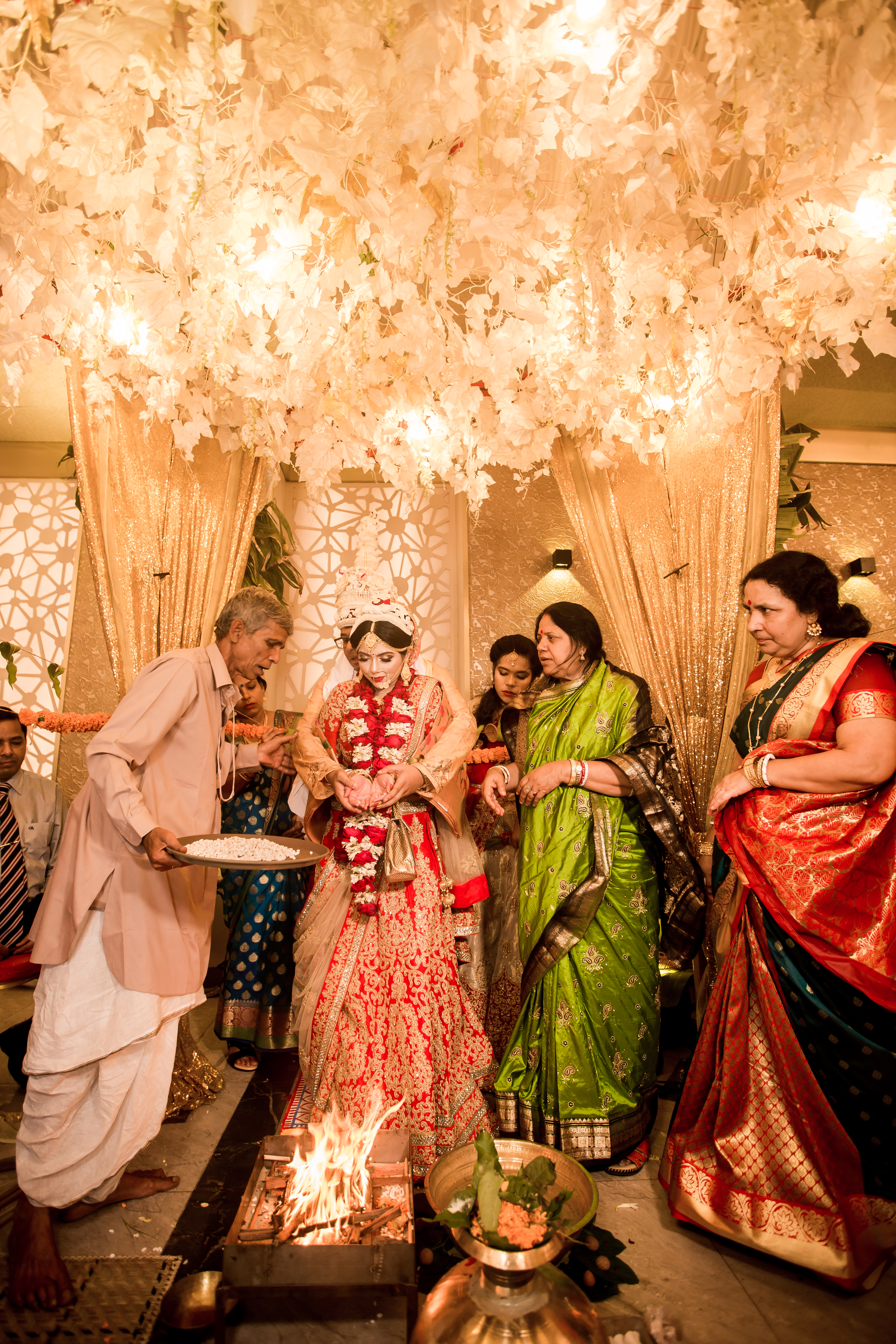
Khoi Porano in Bengali Wedding.

Khoi Porano is an important ritual in a traditional Bengali wedding, symbolising prosperity and unity. After completing Saptapadi, the bride's brother places khoi (puffed rice) in her hands. The groom, standing behind her, holds her hands as they extend their arms forward and offer the khoi into the sacred fire (Yagna). This act signifies their shared commitment to a harmonious married life. The burning of khoi represents the couple's resolve to face life's challenges together. It also highlights the bride's family's blessings for her new journey.

=== Sindoor Daan ===
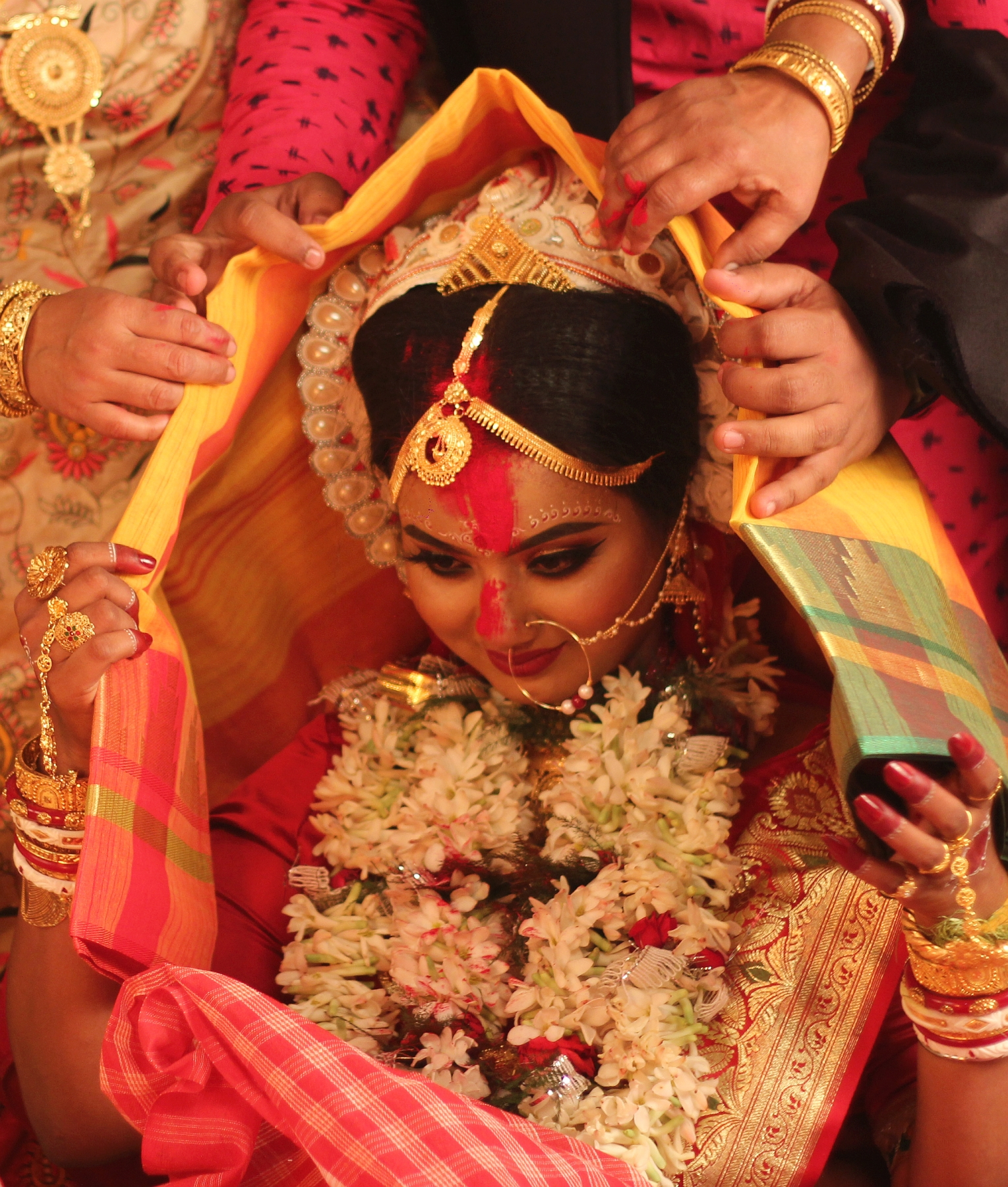
Sindoor Daan in Bengali Wedding.

Sindoor Daan is a significant ritual in a traditional Bengali wedding, marking the union of the bride and groom. During this ceremony at the Chadnatala (wedding altar), the groom applies sindoor (vermilion) to the bride's hair parting using a konke (traditional rice measuring utensil), signifying her transition into married life. He then places a Lajja-Bostro, a new saree from his family, over her head as a gesture of acceptance and protection. This ritual marks the conclusion of the wedding, establishing their bond as husband and wife. The sindoor serves as a lifelong symbol of commitment, respect, and marital devotion in Bengali tradition.

== Post-wedding rituals ==
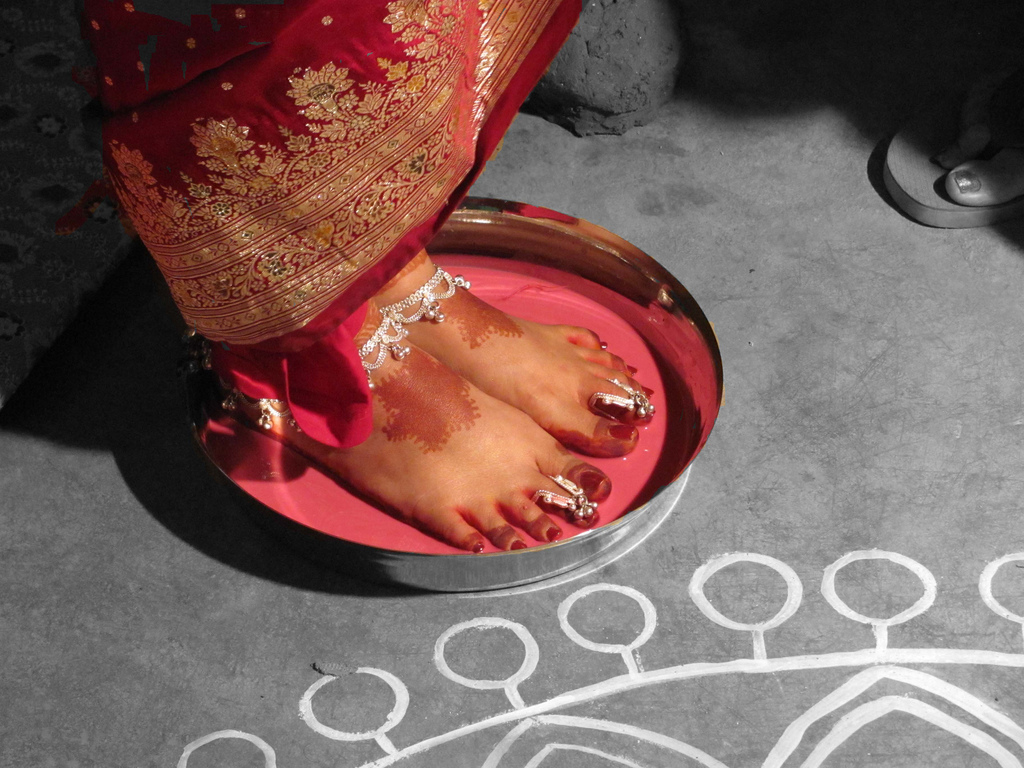
Bou Boron – A new bride stands on a flat plate containing a mixture of alta (lac dye) and milk.

=== Bou Boron ===
Upon the bride and groom's arrival at the groom's house, the Bodhu Boron (or Bou Boron) ceremony is performed to welcome them. The women involved in the ritual step outside the door, where one of them pours water from a brass pitcher (kolshi) onto the ground under the car. The mother (or eldest female relative) of the groom, along with other relatives, receives the couple with warmth. The mother or senior female member of the family also boils milk in a small earthen pot (matir hari), and the bride looks at it to symbolise prosperity and abundance in the new home. This act is part of the Dudh Ondh Lano ritual, where the flowing milk represents abundance, and the groom turns down the boiling milk using a betel nut cracker (janti), known as the Dudh-uthlano rite.

The bride and groom then sit on a low wooden seat (pidi), and the groom's relatives perform the Baran ceremony. The bride, holding a brass pitcher (kolshi) with water, catches a live fish (lyata). Afterward, an elder woman from the groom's family brings a flat stone plate containing a mixture of alta (lac dye) and milk. The elder woman holds the plate under the bride's feet, and the bride steps on a white cloth, leaving her footprints imprinted in red dye and milk. This symbolises the steps of Goddess Lakshmi, marking the arrival of prosperity and blessings into the new household.

=== Bhat kapor ===
The Bhat kapor ritual is a significant tradition in Bengali weddings, performed the day after the ceremony. This ritual symbolises the groom's commitment to caring for his bride by ensuring her well-being, including food, clothing, and overall support. As part of the tradition, the groom presents his bride with a saree, sindoor, and other essentials for a married woman, along with a plate of traditional Bengali cuisine.

=== Bou Bhat ===
On the evening of the Bou Bhat ritual, the groom's family hosts a reception to introduce the new bride to their relatives, friends, and neighbours. Guests arrive, present gifts to the bride, and enjoy a meal. The bride's family is honoured as the special guests of the occasion and arrives together in a procession known as Kone Jatri or the bridal party. The bridal party brings a list of items for the bride, groom, and the groom's family, known as Phul Sajjar Tatwa. This list includes dhotis for the elder male members, sarees for the elder female members, food, fruits, sweets, and cosmetics such as powder, perfume, lac dye, vermilion, and floral ornaments. After the guests depart, the bride and groom share a meal with the groom's family.

== Image gallery ==
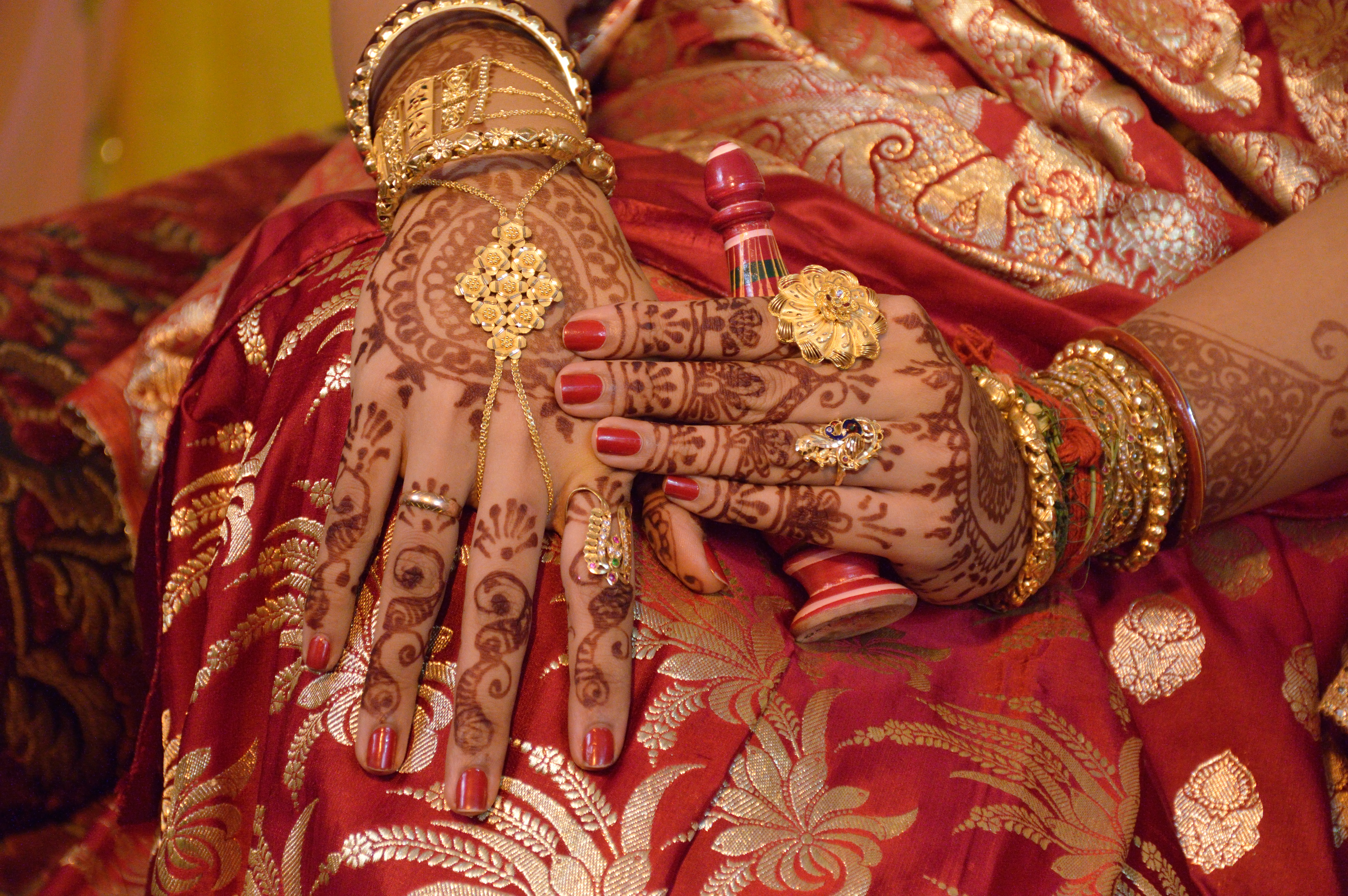
Mehendi-clad hands – Hindu bride from Bengal

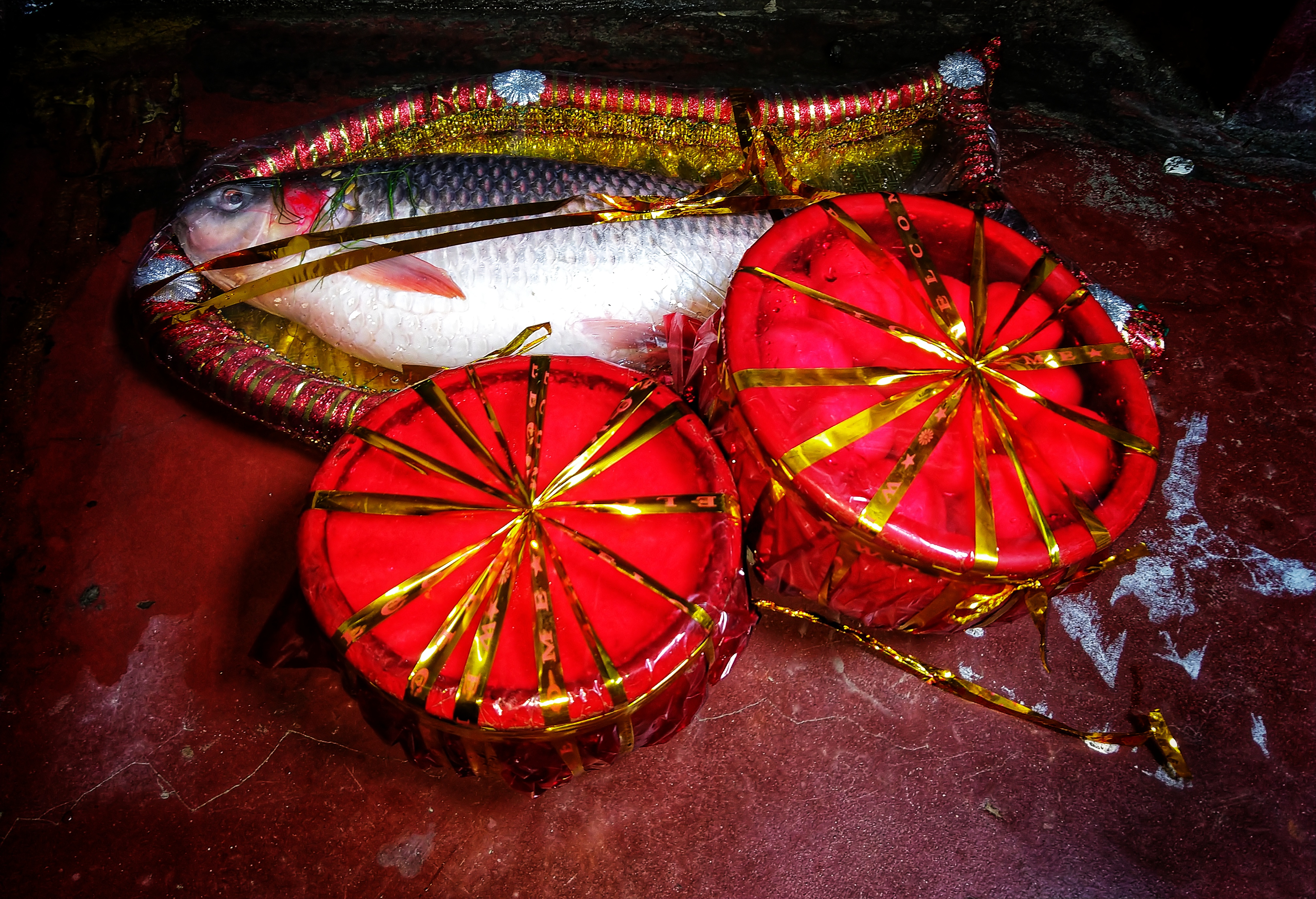
Fish and Sweet pot, parts of Bengali wedding

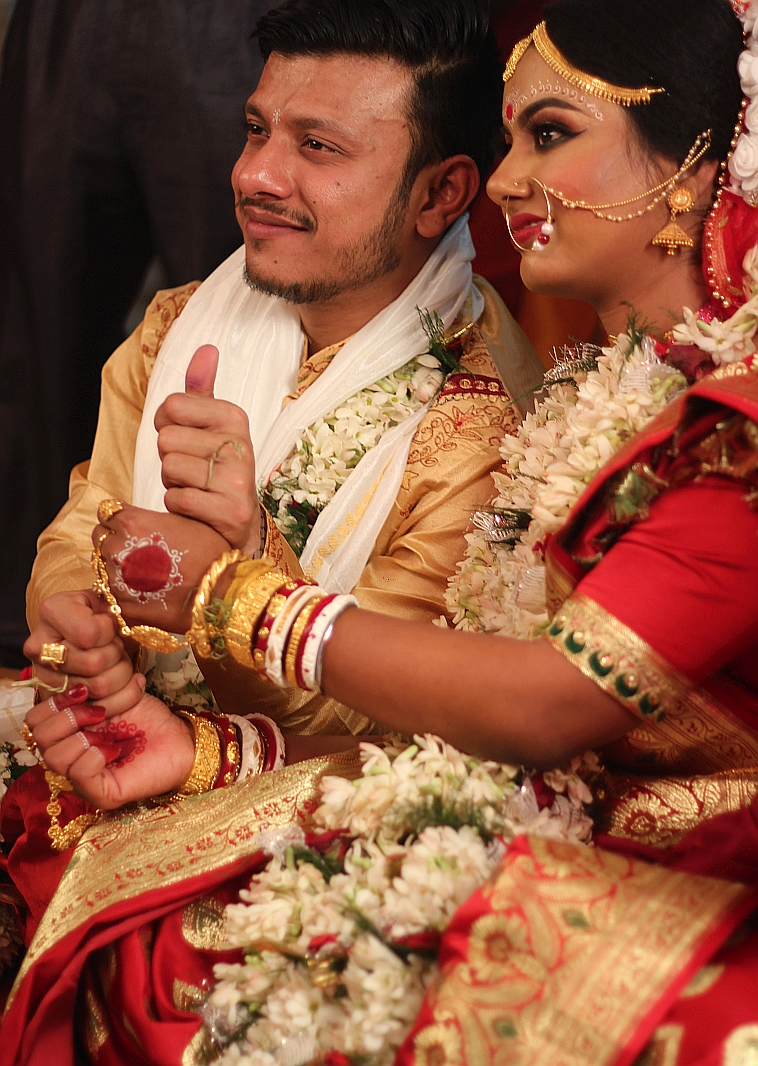
Bengali Marriage Rituals

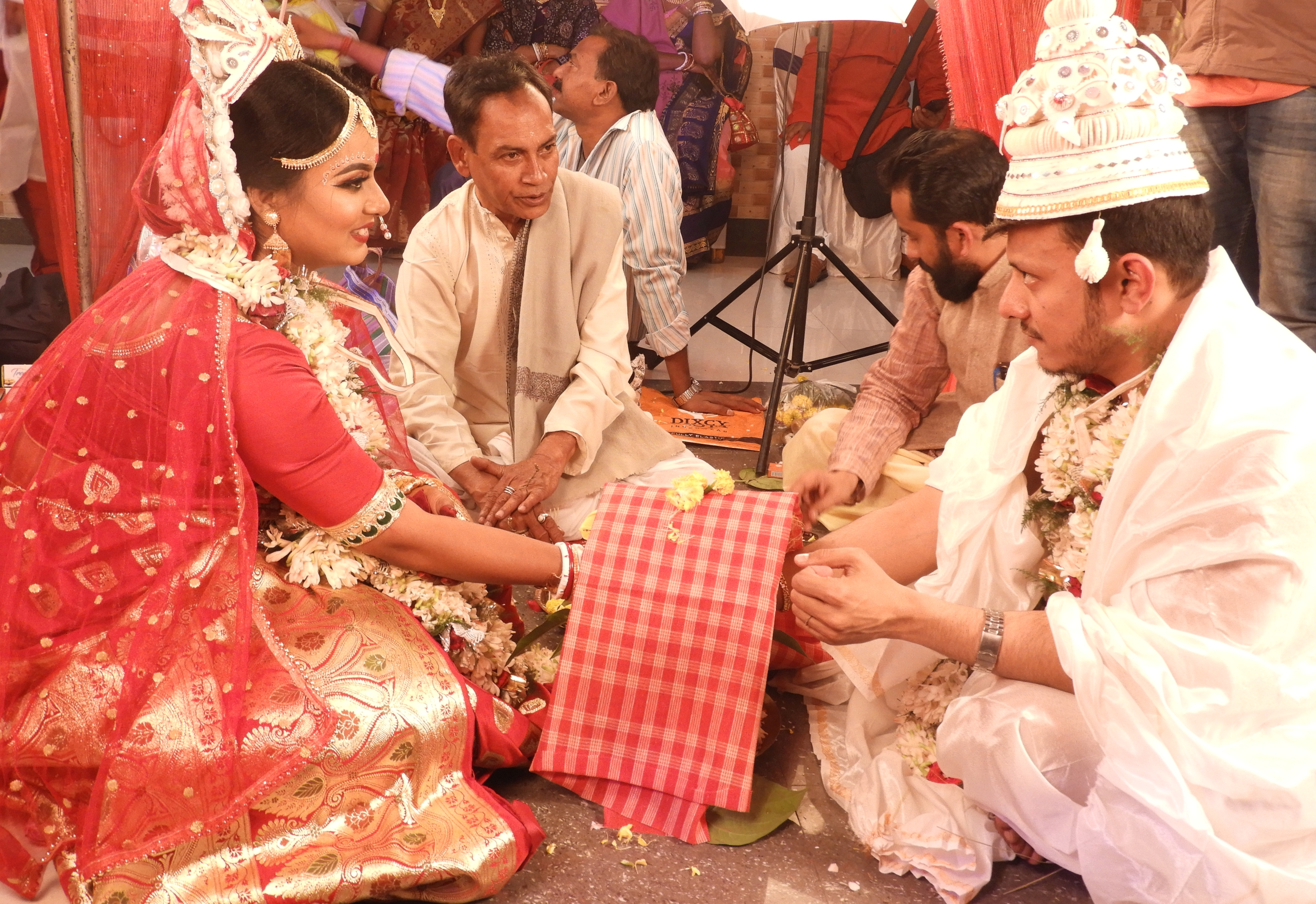
Konnadan – Bengali Marriage Rituals

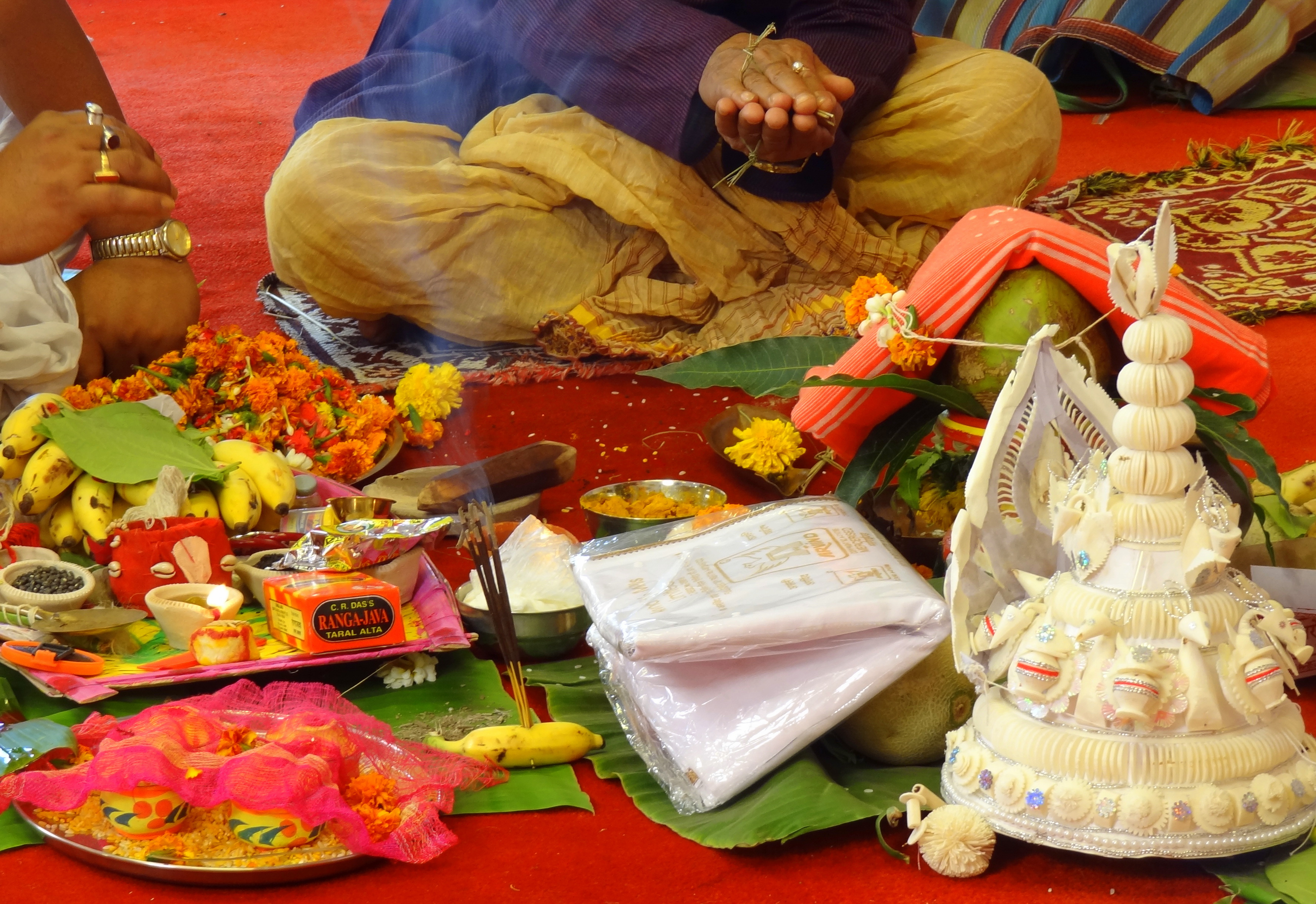
Pre-marriage rituals of a Bengali wedding in India

Other rituals may vary by region and circumstance, but the underlying spiritual connection remains central to these acts, enriching conjugal life.

== See also ==
- Bengali Muslim wedding
- Culture of Bengal
- Culture of West Bengal
- Culture of Bangladesh
- Jamai Sasthi
- Sadhbhakshan
- Shakha, Pola and Noa
