= Durus kura =

Traditional fried chicken curry Rohingya and Chittagonian cuisine

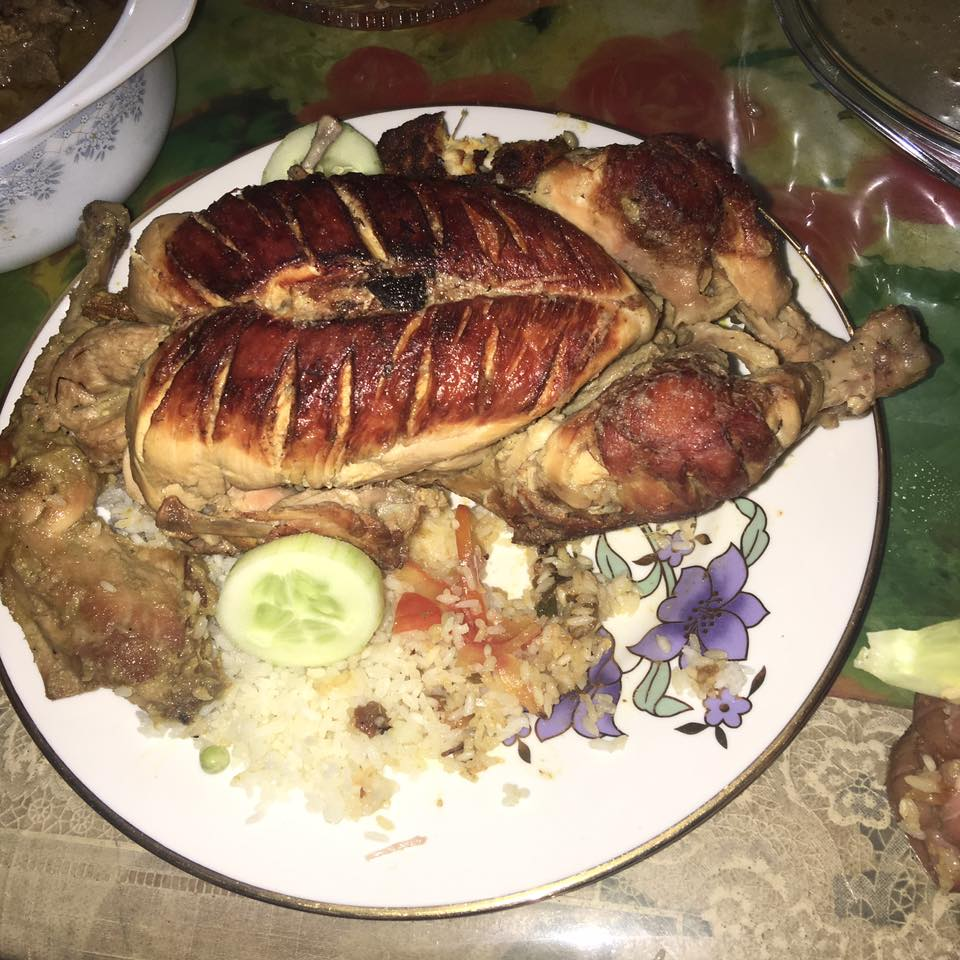
- Traditional Durus kura
- Alternative names: Chicken durus
- Course: Main
- Place of origin: Myanmar and Bangladesh
- Region or state: Chittagong
- Associated cuisine: Bangladesh
- Created by: بنجلاديش
- Serving temperature: ساخنة

Durus kura (or simply Durus) is a traditional fried chicken curry, one of the most significant , Bangladeshi dishes in the Bengali cuisine of ]] and Chittagong, which is basically skinless whole chicken cooked in a thick broth. Duroos is typically popular for guests during weddings and other events in Chittagong. Duroos can be served with polao or khichuri. Chicken is called kura or kuro in the Chittagonian language, from which the name derives. Chittagonians of Chittagong traditionally serves this dish to the groom in the wedding occasion.

== Ingredient ==
- Skinless whole chicken,
- salt,
- turmeric paste,
- green chilli and dry red chilli paste,
- cumin paste,
- coriander paste,
- garam masala paste,
- ginger paste,
- garlic paste and
- onion paste.

== Process ==
The whole chicken should be cleaned and washed well and the two sides of the chicken breast should be pierced and the legs should be bent. All the spices should be mixed well throughout the body. Then in a pan on stove, mixture of onion paste, ginger paste, garlic paste, green chilli paste, turmeric powder, cumin powder, salt, poppy seed paste, coconut paste, almond paste, bay leaf and water needs to be poured with the whole chicken. After that, covering with a lid it's required to cook for 20 minutes. After 20 minutes, removing from the pan the lid should be opened. Later, it's required to put oil in another pan on the stove. When the oil is hot, the boiled chicken should be fried well on both sides. After that, the boiled chicken masala pan should be kept on the oven, mixed the powdered milk with garam masala powder. Then it needs to stir with the boiled chicken, and cover it to cook for another 5 minutes. At the end, when it turns red, it has to be taken down.

== See also ==
- List of chicken dishes
- List of meat dishes
- Chicken curry
