= Bengali Muslim wedding =

Bengali variant of Muslim wedding

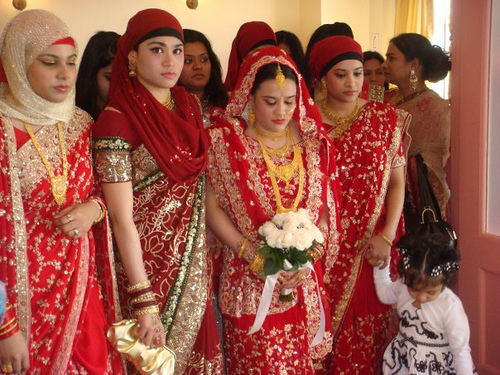
Bengali Muslim wife performing wedding walk

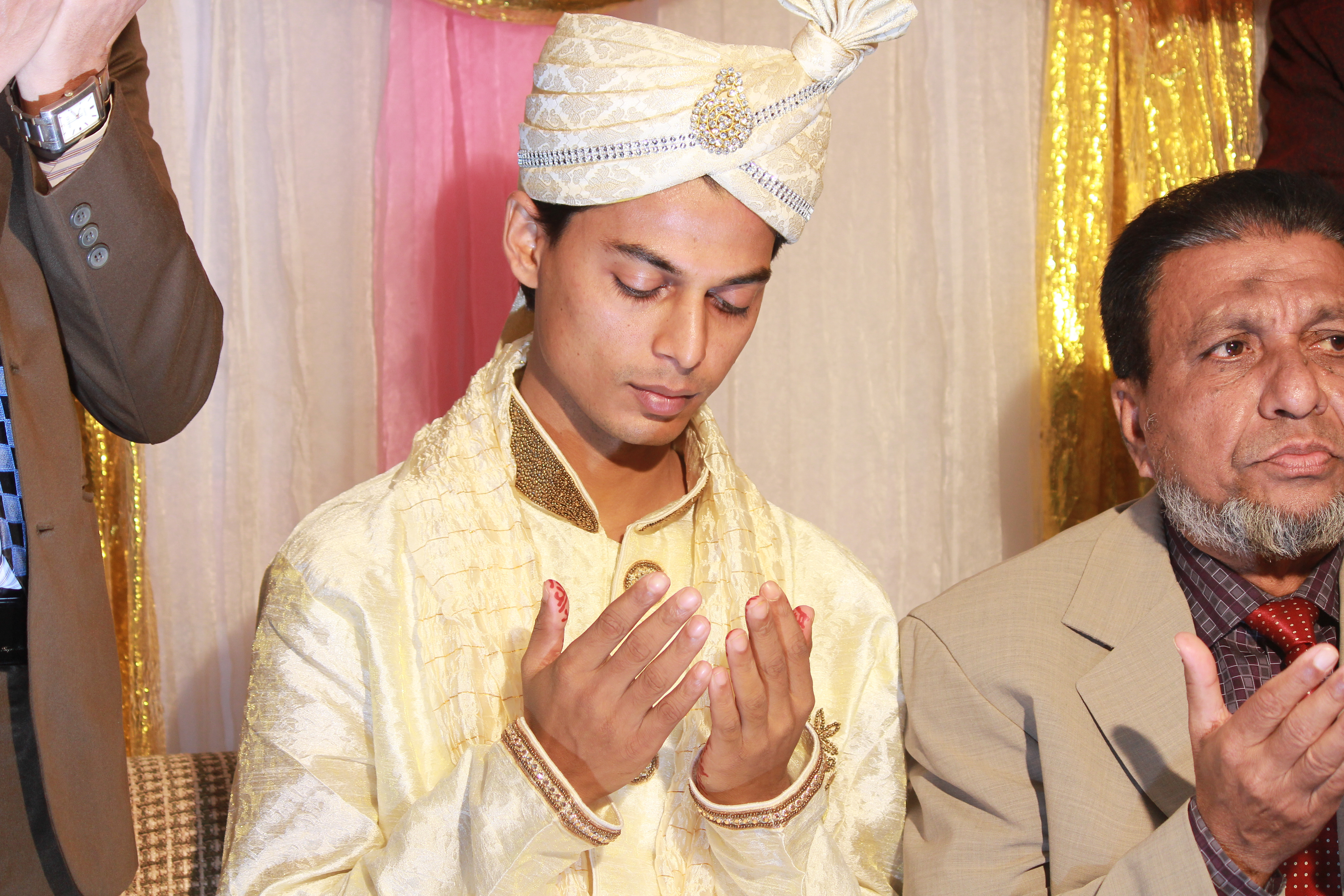
Groom is praying according to Muslim marriage rituals

A Bengali Muslim wedding (Bengali: বাঙালি মুসলিম বিয়ে) features distinctive religious rituals that take place over multiple days and are seen mainly among the Bengali Muslims of Bangladesh and, to a lesser extent, among the Muslim population of West Bengal, India.

== History ==
=== Background ===
Muslims first arrived in Bengal in the year 1204, bringing their own cultural and religious traditions from Persia, Arabia, and Turkestan. Over time, they integrated with the local society, adopting various indigenous customs while maintaining their distinct identity. This cultural exchange influenced many aspects of life, including marriage rituals. One such tradition was Gaye Holud, a turmeric ceremony rooted in Vedic (Hindu) rituals, which became a part of Bengali Muslim weddings.

== Pre-wedding rituals ==
=== Gaye Holud ===
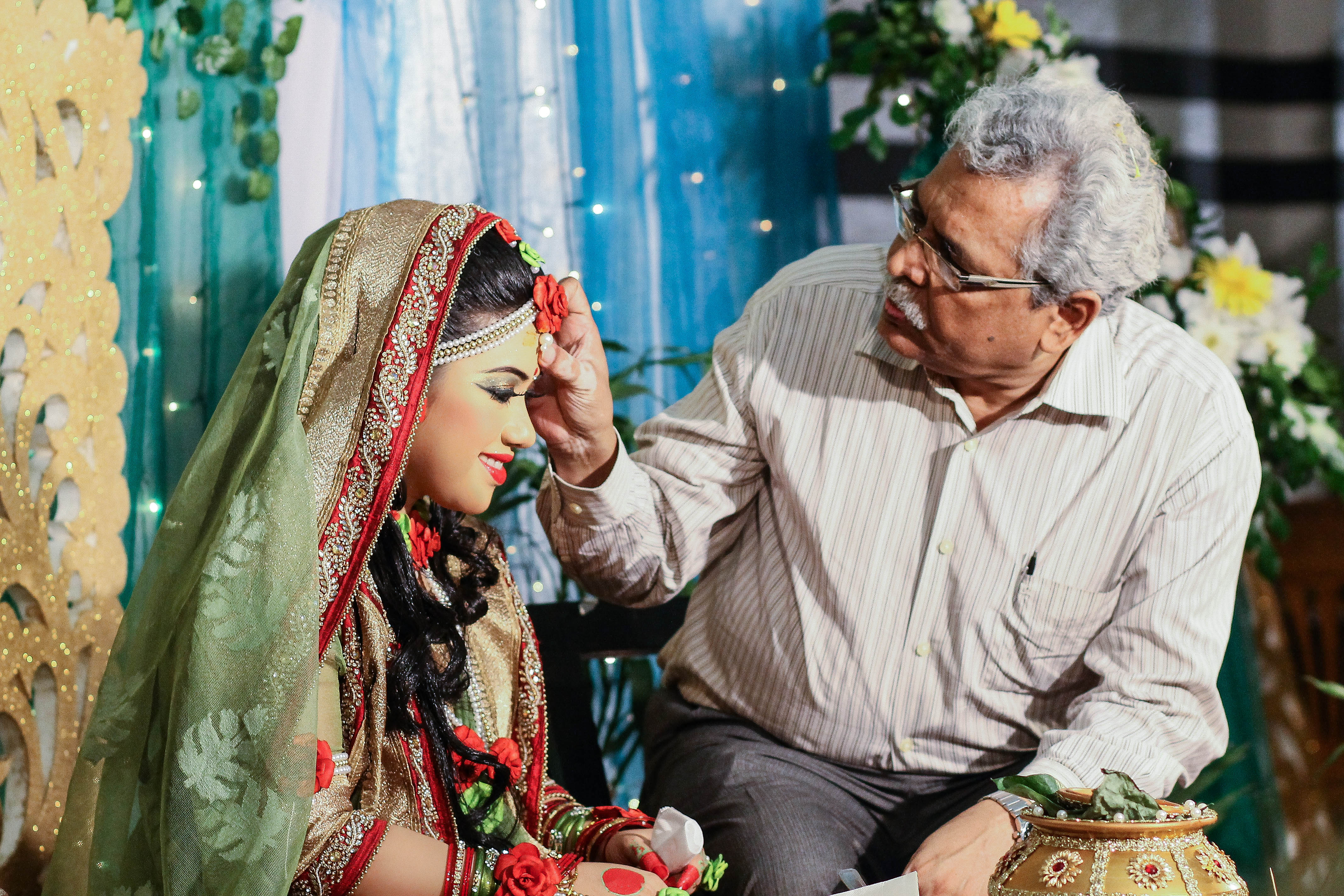
Gaye Holud ceremony in Dhaka, Bangladesh

Gaye Holud (Bengali: গায়ে হলুদ), meaning "[applying] turmeric to [the] body," is a traditional Bengali pre-wedding ritual where the groom's family, without the groom, visits the bride's house on the morning of the ceremony to celebrate and perform the turmeric function. Both the bride's and groom's families apply turmeric paste during their respective Gaye Holud ceremonies on the wedding day. This tradition symbolises purification and marks the beginning of their new journey together.

Bengali Muslims incorporated this practice under names like Haldi Kota and Tilwayi. This cultural blending reflects Bengal's history of religious and social harmony. Even today, Gaye Holud remains an essential part of Bengali Muslim weddings.

=== Meyeli Git ===
Meyeli Git (Bengali: মেইলী গীত) is a traditional folk song performed by rural women during social ceremonies and family gatherings. Women create and tune these songs themselves, conveying emotions of happiness, sorrow, and longing. They are often sung during wedding rituals such as gaye halud, bridal bathing, and farewells. Typically performed without instruments, they may occasionally feature percussion like the dhol or tom-tom. Meyeli Git reflects the cultural heritage of rural women, passing down stories and traditions across generations. These songs add a touch of humour through playful exchanges between the bride's and groom's families, enriching the celebratory atmosphere.

== Post-wedding rituals ==
=== Bou Bhat ===
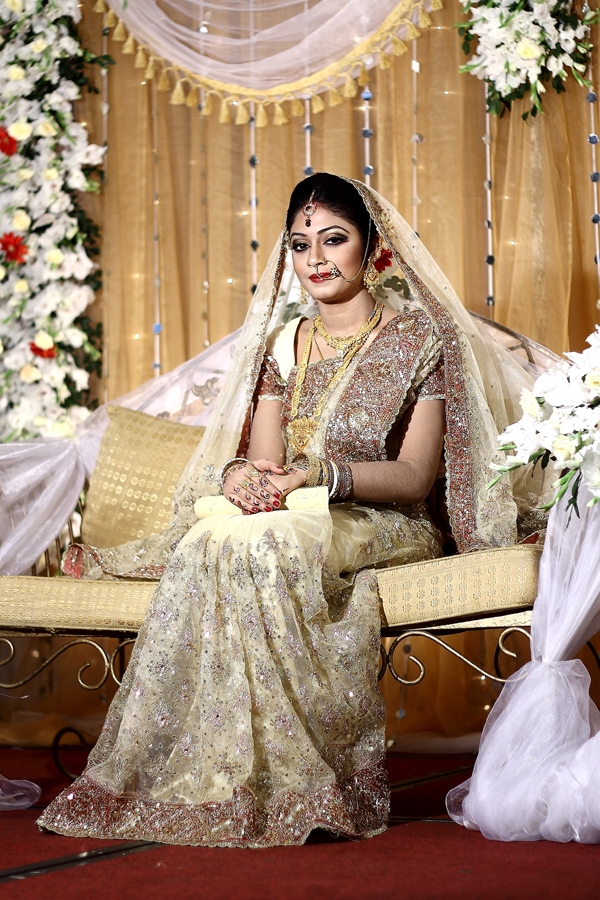
A Bengali bride on her Bou Bhat in Dhaka, Bangladesh

On the evening of the Bou Bhat (Bengali: বউভাত) ritual, the groom's family hosts a reception to introduce the new bride to their relatives, friends, and neighbours. Guests arrive, present gifts to the bride, and enjoy a meal. The bride's family is honoured as the special guests of the occasion and arrives together in a procession known as Kone Jatri or the bridal party. The bridal party brings a list of items for the bride, groom, and the groom's family, known as Phul-Sajjar Tatwa. This list includes dhotis for the elder male members, sarees for the elderly female members, food, fruits, sweets, and cosmetics such as powder, perfume, lac dye, vermilion, and flower ornaments. After the guests depart, the bride and groom share a meal with the groom's family.

== Variations ==
In traditional village weddings, attendees come in bullock carts. After the wedding and reception, bride goes to her in-law's in palanquin.

== Gallery ==
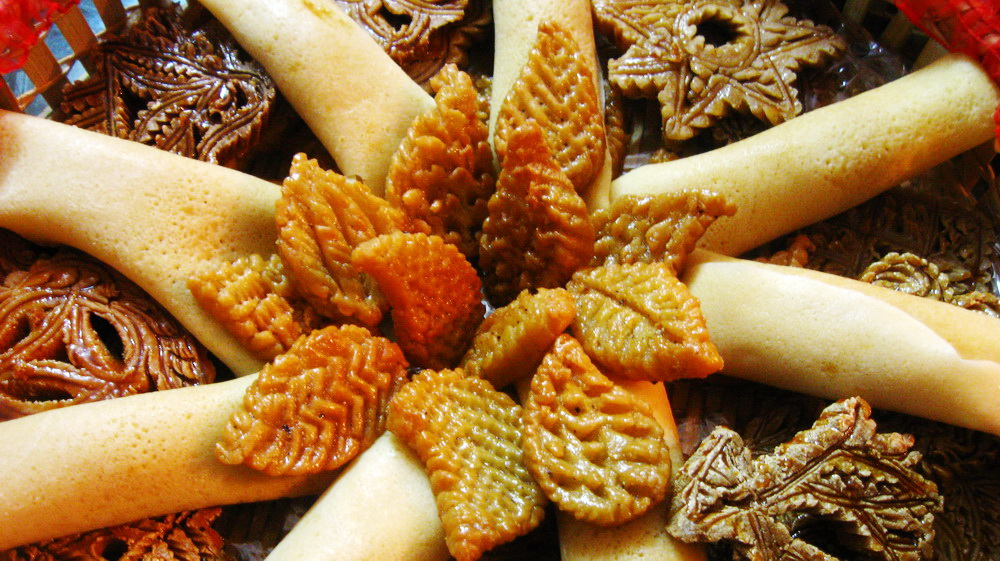
Varieties of Pitha, a Bengali sweet dish, decorated to be sent as a gift to the bride's house.

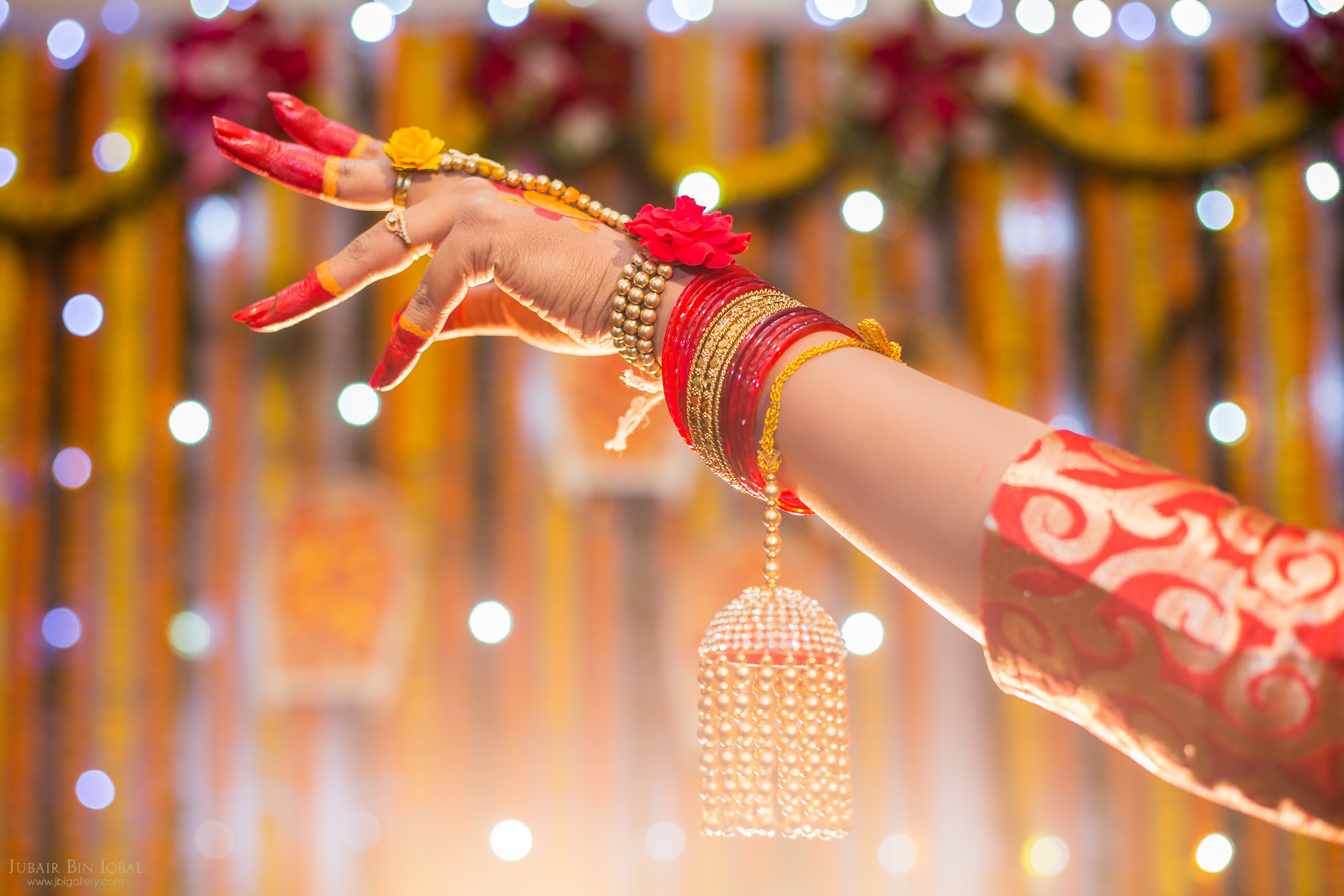
A Bengali Muslim bride's hand adorned with alta on her Gaye Holud

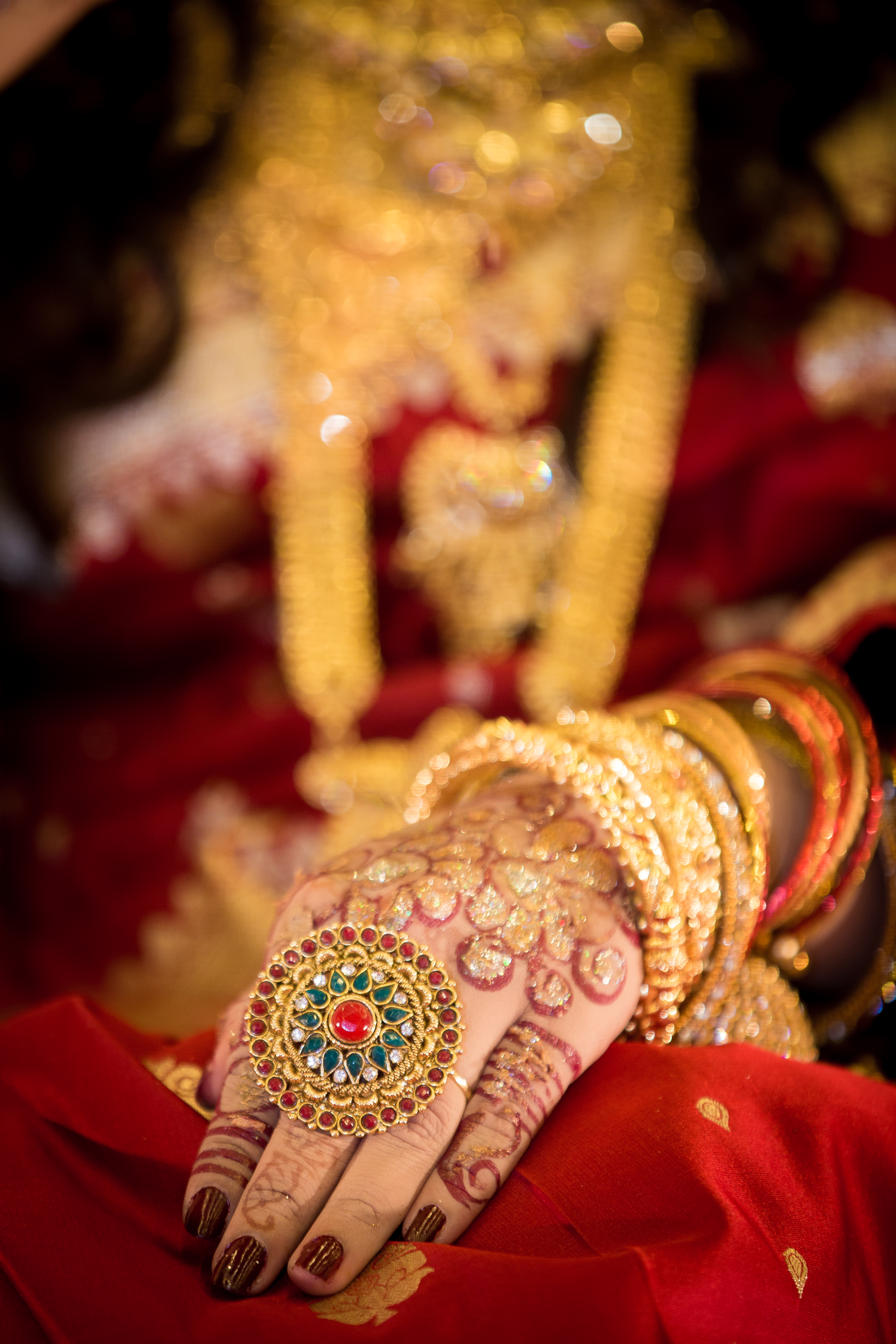
Bride's hand with a large ring

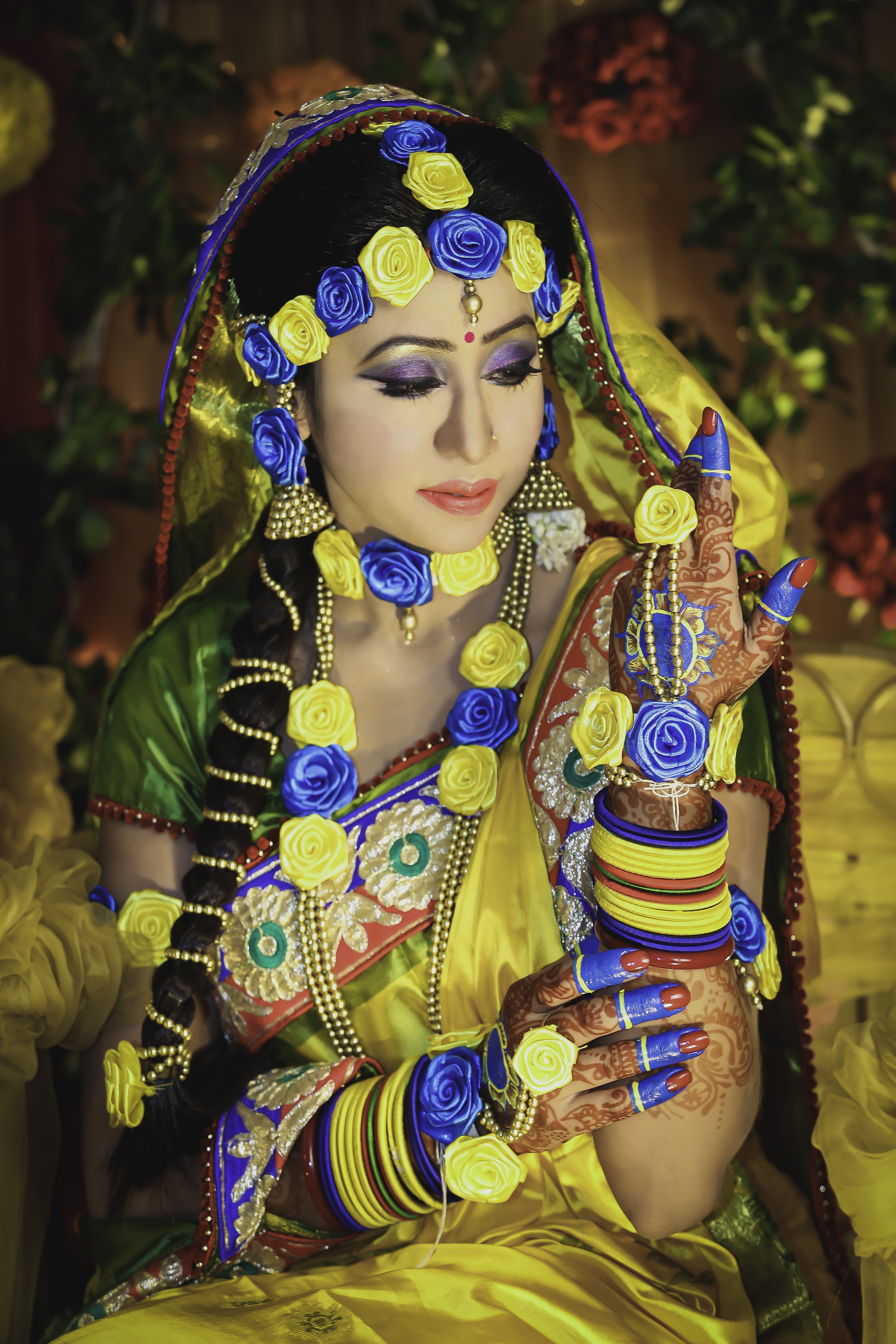
A traditional Bengali bride on her Gaye Holud

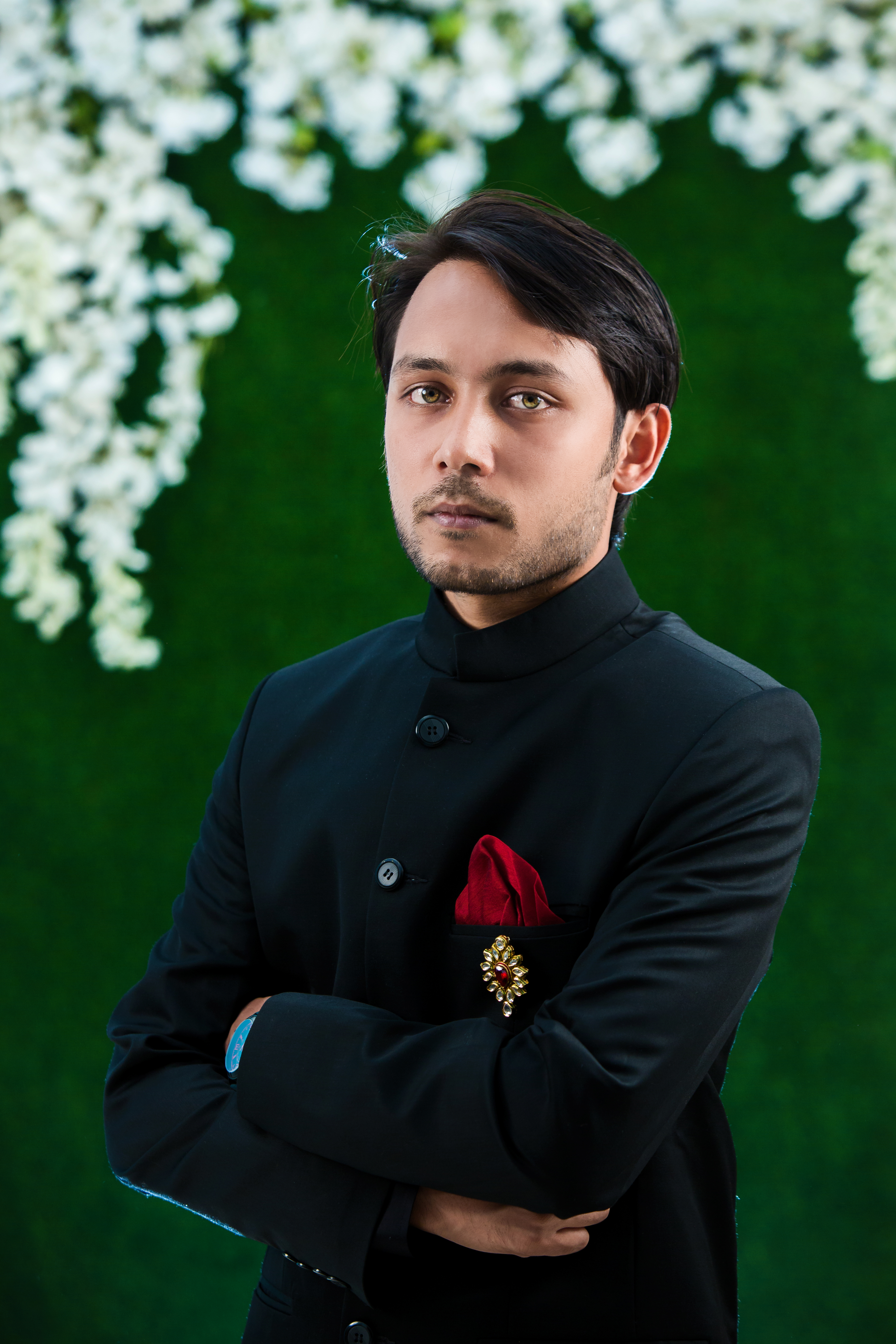
A Bengali Muslim groom in traditional Sherwani

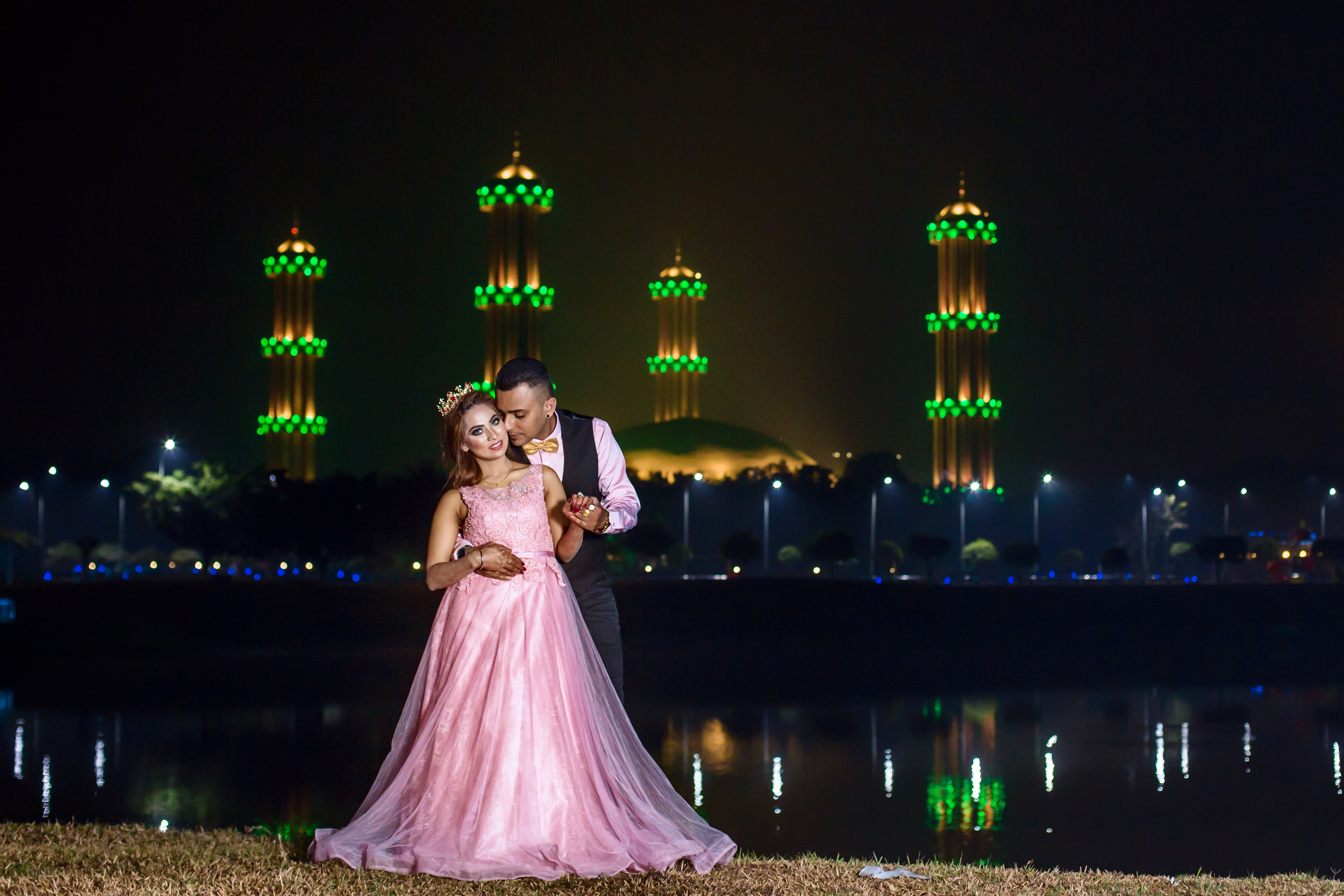
A couple on their photo session in Western wedding attire

== See also ==
- Bengali Hindu wedding
- Gaye Holud
- Bou Bhat
- Shagorana
- Islamic marital practices
- Culture of Bangladesh
- Culture of Bengal
