= Gaye holud =

Bengali wedding ceremony ritual

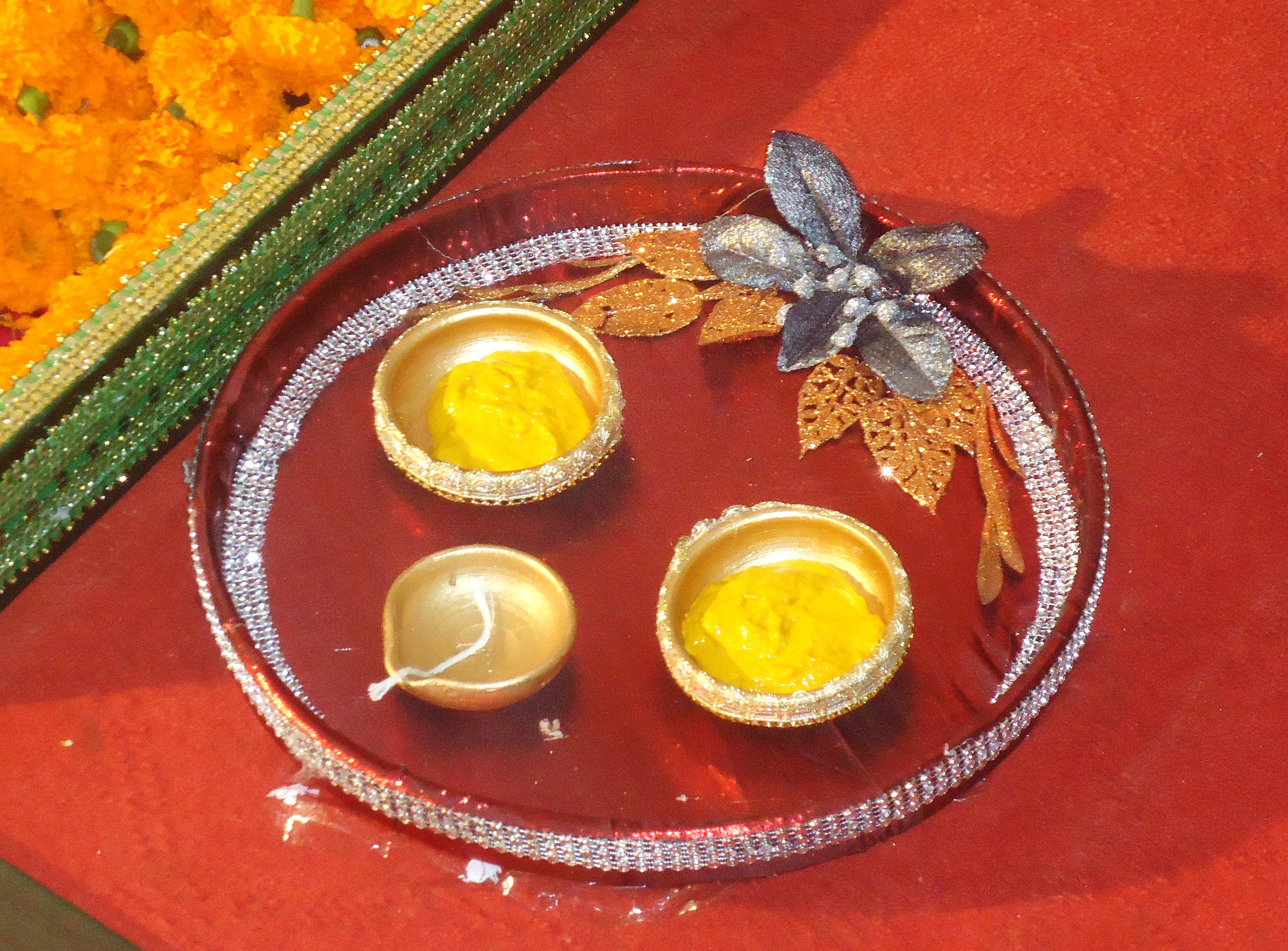
Paste of turmeric prepared for Gaye Holud ceremony

Gaye Holud (Bengali: গায়ে হলুদ, lit. 'turmeric on the body') or gatro-horidra (গাত্র-হরিদ্রা) is a pre-wedding ceremony, observed among the Bengali people. It traditionally involves applying turmeric-based paste to the bride and groom. It is prominent in Bangladesh and the Indian state of West Bengal and is also celebrated within the Bengali diaspora.

It is widely observed among both Bengali Muslims and Hindus.

== History ==
The ceremony forms part of the broader South Asian tradition of applying tumeric during wedding celebrations, which is commonly known as Haldi. Tumeric has been used since ancient times and had been used in culinary, medicinal, cosmetic and ceremonial practices throughout the Indian subcontinent.

The practice developed within Bengali wedding culture and its folk culture, incorporating turmeric application with customs involving communal gatherings, gifts, music, dance, food and other forms of festivities. The ceremony can be held separately by the bride's and groom's family or as a joint celebration, with its customs varying among families.

== Ceremonial process ==
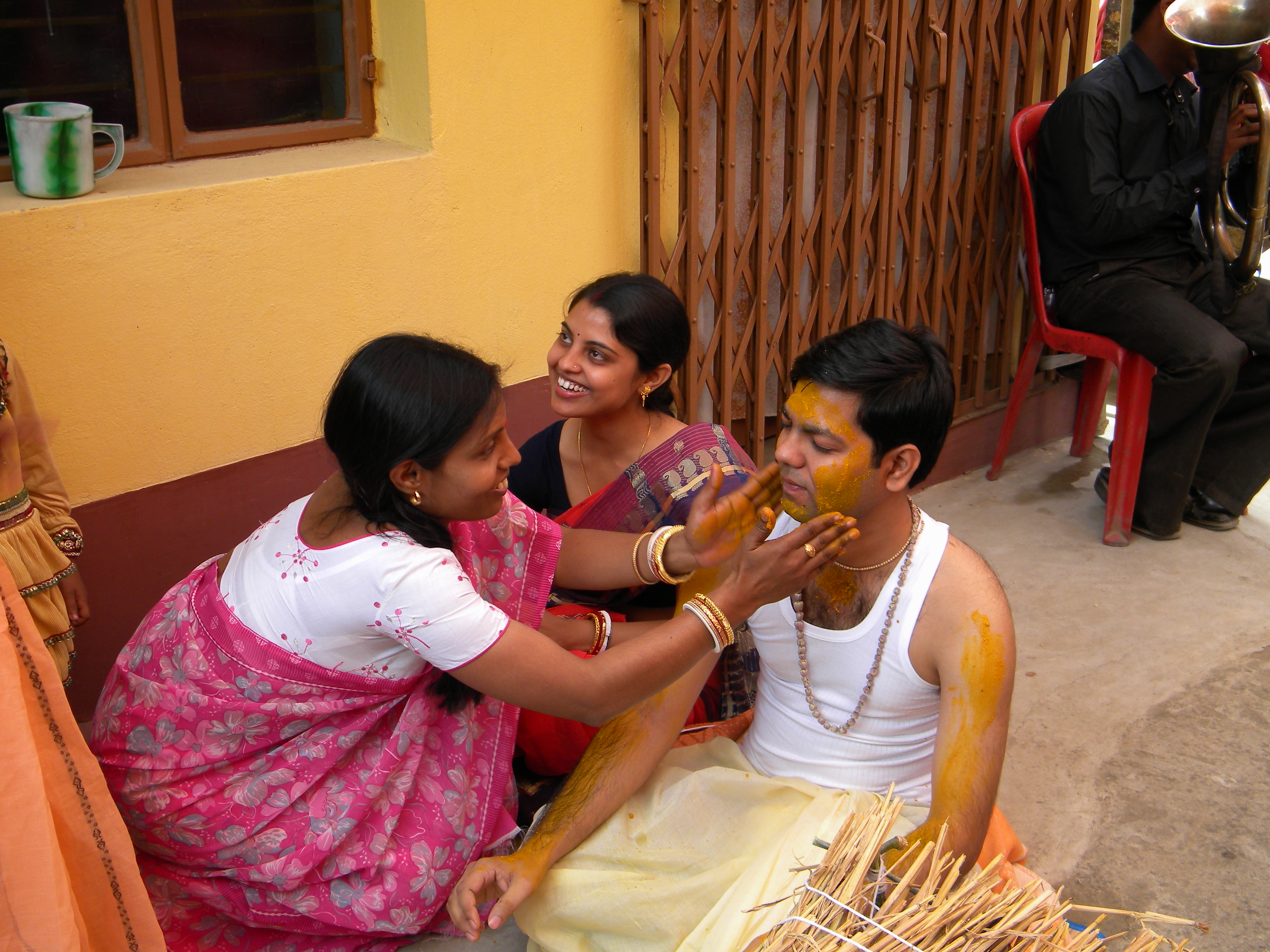
Gaye holud ceremony of a Hindu groom in West Bengal, India

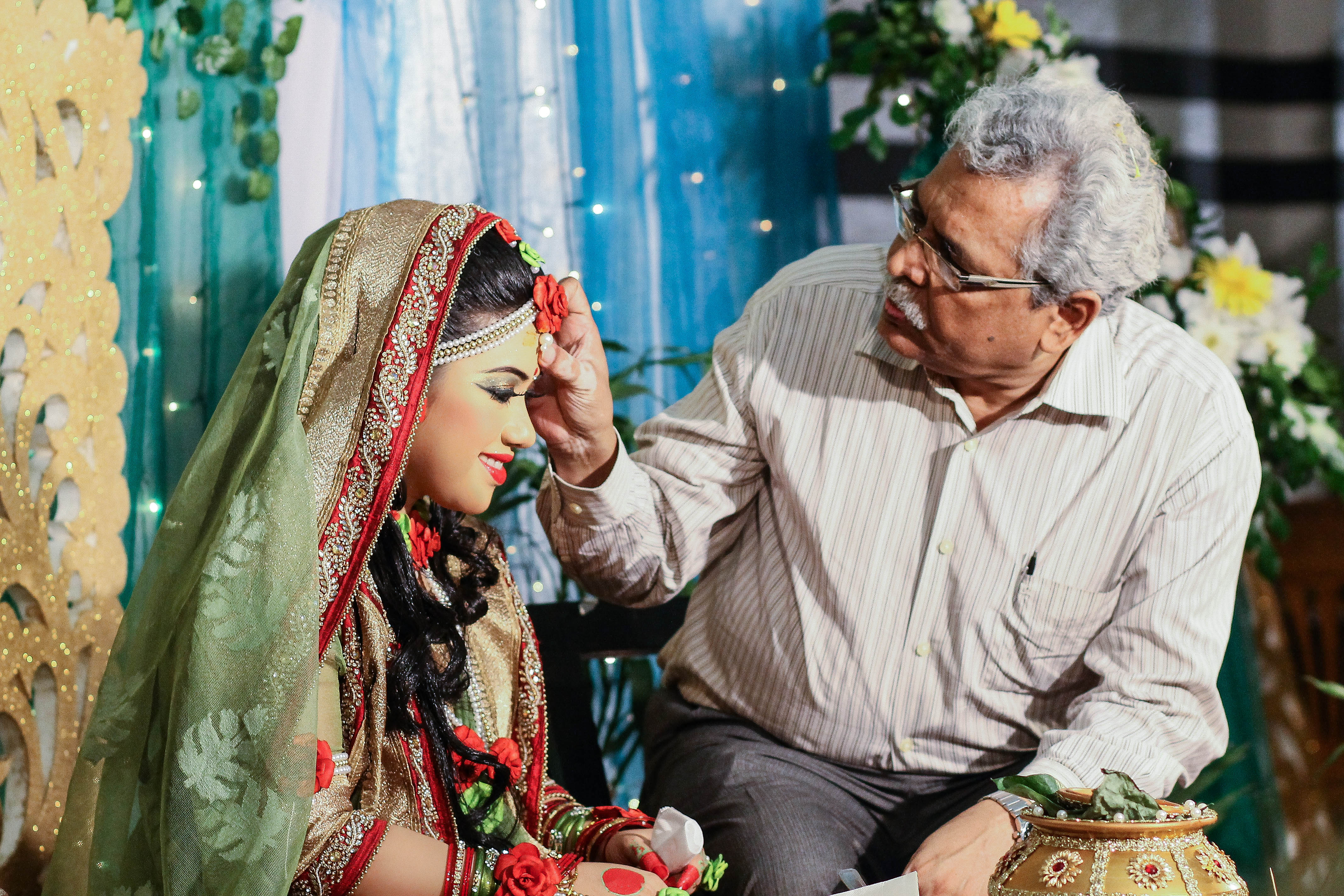
Gaye holud ceremony of a Muslim bride in Dhaka, Bangladesh

The bride is seated on a dais and the turmeric paste is applied by the guests to her face and body. Sweets are then fed to the bride by all the guests and attendants, piece by piece. In some families, henna is used to decorate her hands and feet with elaborate abstract designs. During the ceremony, it is customary for the families to exchange gifts. The turmeric used in the ritual typically comes from the groom's home, along with other elaborately adorned gifts (tattwa), presented by the groom’s family to the bride's family. These gifts—often including fish (especially ilish), sweets, and clothing—are not to be confused with dowry; their significance lies in the intricate artistry of their decoration rather than the monetary value. The ceremony is often an elaborate showcase of family heritage, involving specific decorative motifs and traditional alpona.

== Popularity and cultural landscape ==
Although it is considered a part of the Bengali wedding tradition, the couple is not considered married at the end of the gaye holud, as no legal marriage is performed during the ceremony. Unlike the wedding ceremonies, the gaye holud is not a formal or extravagant event; both guests and bridal party members dress more simply and decorate the venue less intricately than at the wedding ceremonies. In these contexts, it has evolved into a secular, high-spirited event, often characterized by contemporary music, dance performances, and lavish decorations, reflecting a shared linguistic and regional identity across religious lines.

For the Bengali Hindus, gaye holud is sometimes incorporated into the broader set of Hindu rituals. In West Bengal, the ceremony is associated as a spiritual preparation influenced by ancient Vedic and Puranic traditions. The "touched" turmeric is considered highly auspicious as it symbolically connects the two individuals before the formal union.

== Gallery ==
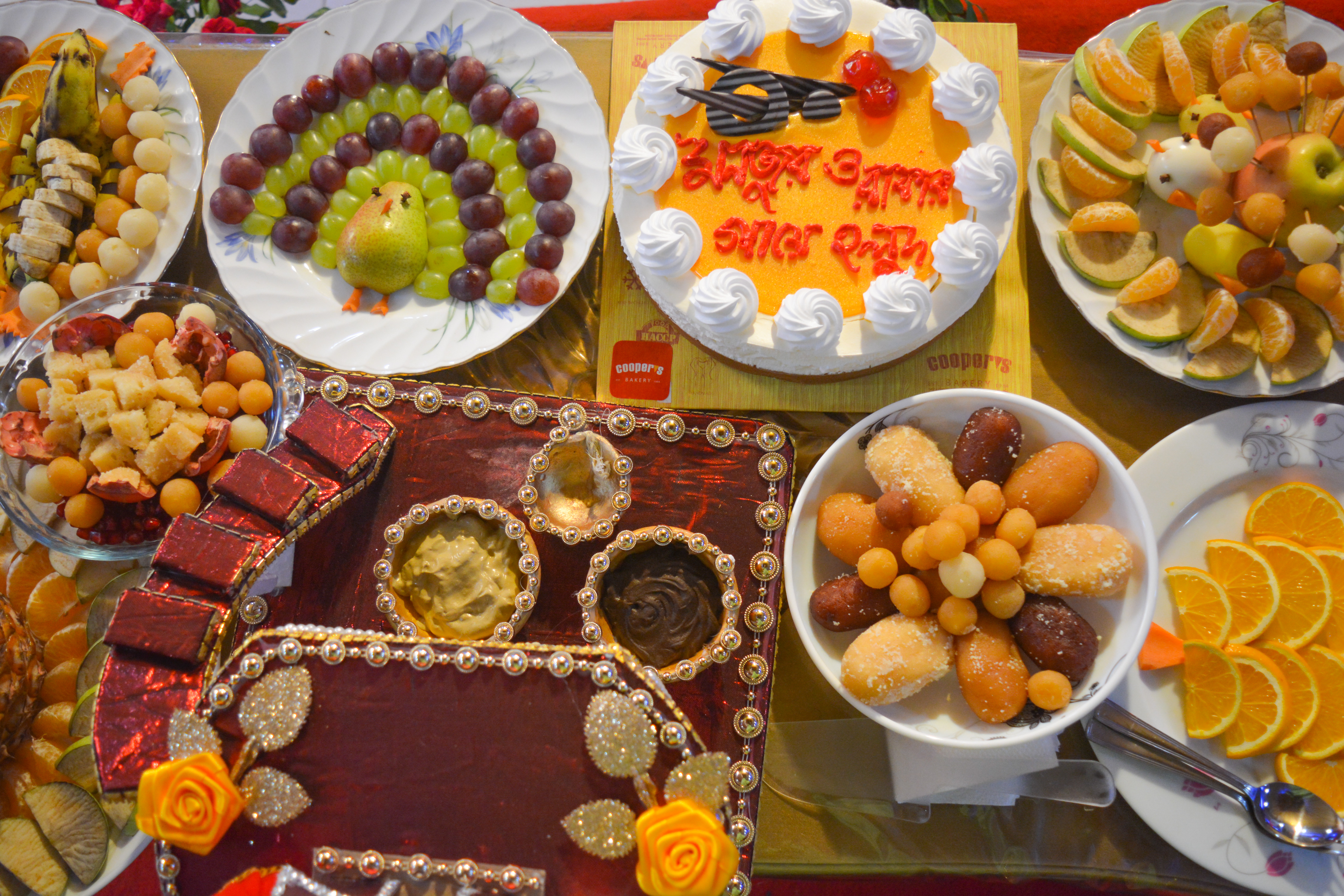
Traditional Bengali sweets, fruits and a cake presented in a gaye holud ceremony

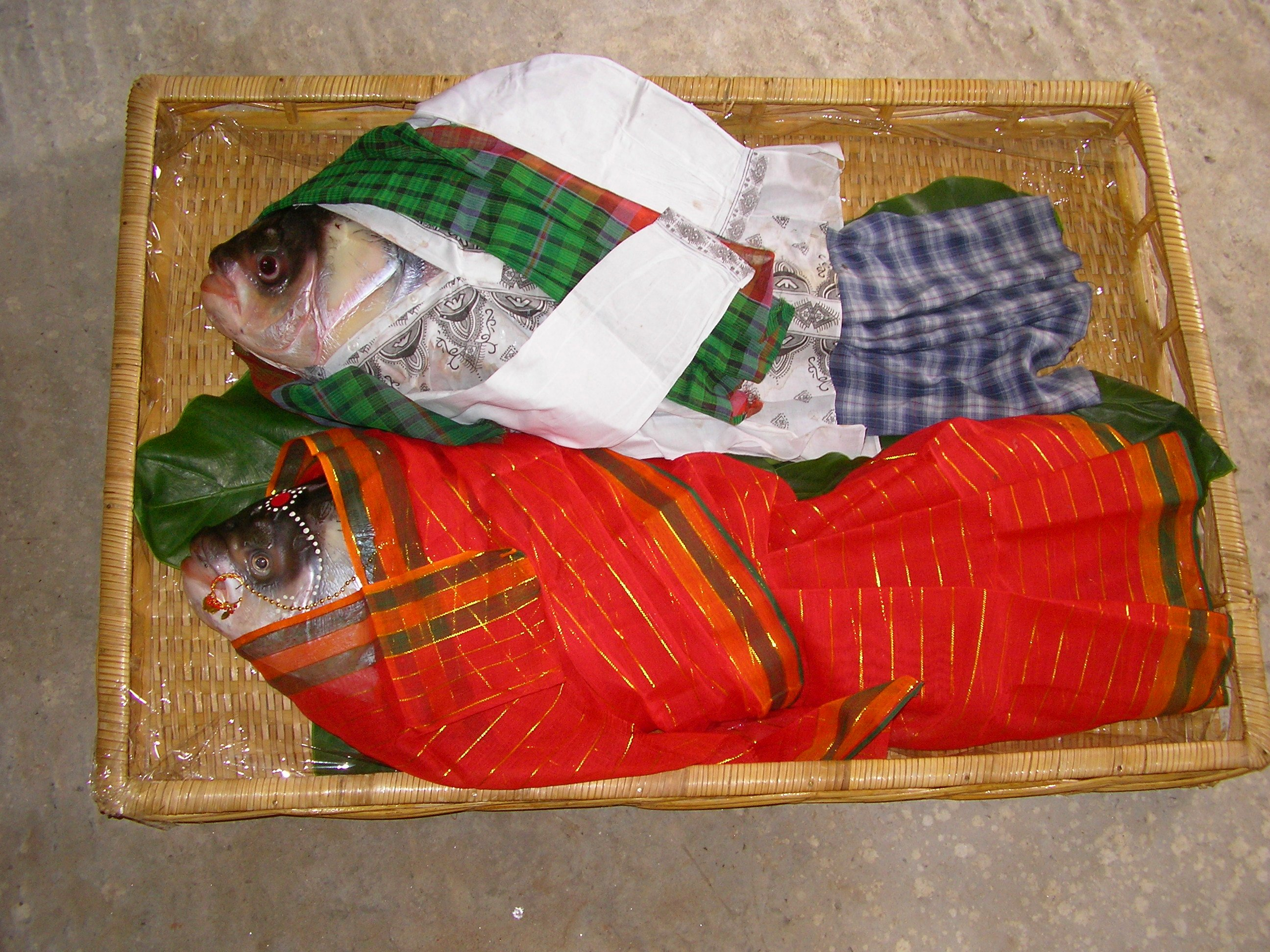
The groom's family members often bring fish decorated as a wedding couple to the bride's gaye holud

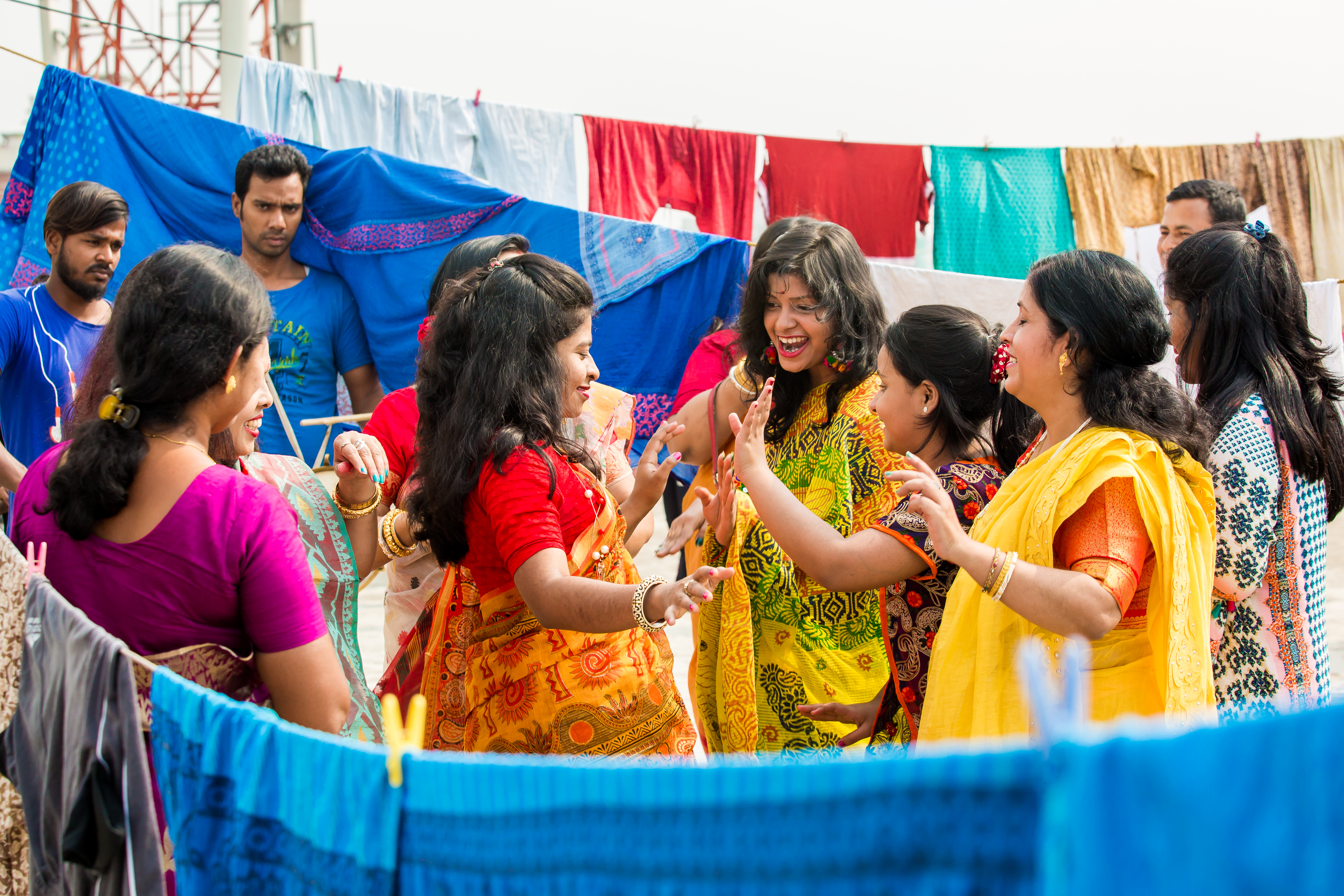
Girls are dancing in Bangladeshi gaye holud ceremony

== See also ==
- Mayian, similar turmeric ceremony observed by the Punjabis
- Haldi Kumkum, also an Indian wedding ceremony rooted South Indian traditions
- Mehndi night, henna application ceremony in Arab and Indian cultures
