= Alta (dye) =

Red dye applied to hands and feet during weddings and festivals

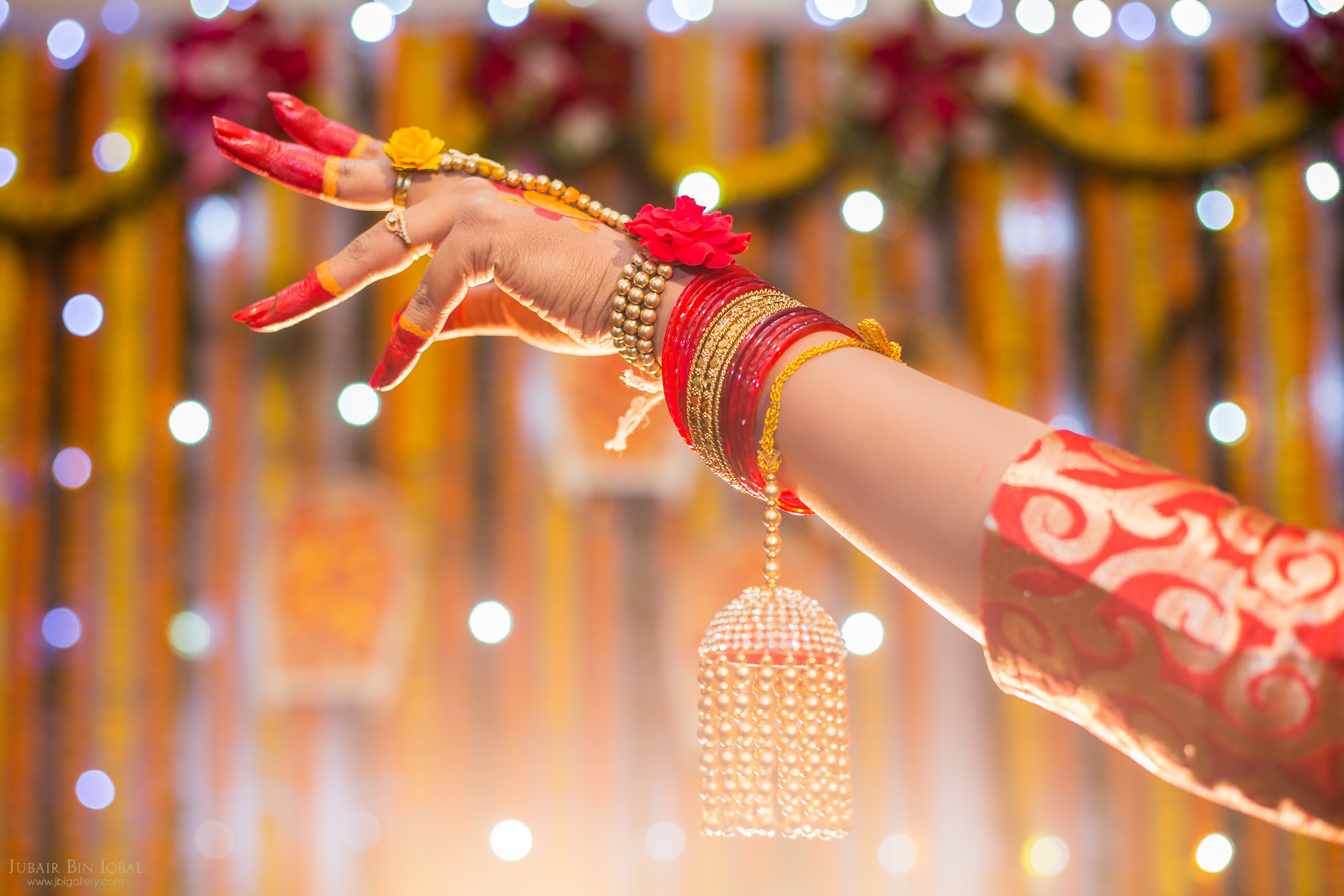
A bride's hand adorned with alta on her gaye holud ceremony

Alta (Bhojpuri: 𑂄𑂪𑂞𑂰, Bengali: আলতা), lakshaya rasa, alah, parani, vasantam or mahavar is a red dye mainly used in India, Bangladesh and Nepal to tint the hands and feet as a cultural practice. It is usually applied with a cotton swab or brush during wedding ceremonies and festivals.

Natural alta is produced from red lac, although today it is mainly replaced with synthetic dyes.

== Early history ==
Early mention of alta comes from Upanishads where it is known as lakshaya rasa meaning red-lac dye pigment derived from lac resin as one of sixteen adornments of woman known as solah-shringar.

Within Hindu Vedas, Alta is associated with deities Lakshmi, Durga, and Krishna. The color red holds significance with Hinduism as it represents fertile soil and marks purity and fertility.

== Cultural significance ==
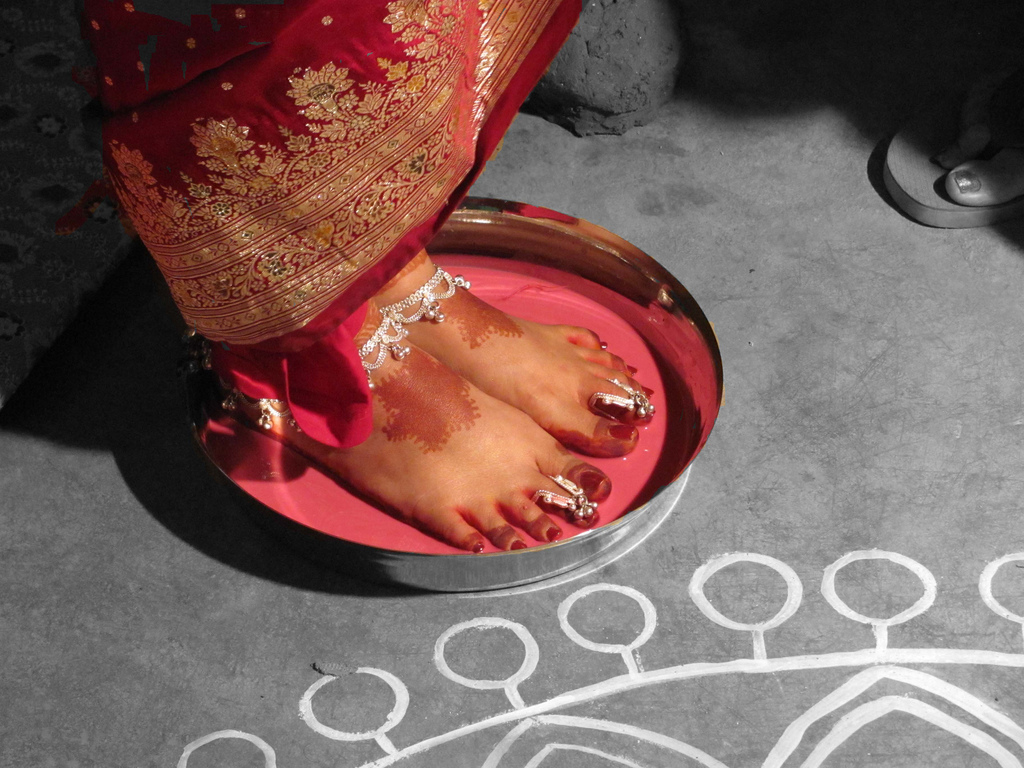
A ceremony welcoming the newly wed bride to her new home, with the feet dipped in a mixture of milk and alta

Alta has cultural and religious significance in Bengali, Bihari and Odia culture Regardless of religious beliefs, women traditionally adorn their hands and feet with alta for marriage and cultural festivals like Pohela Baishakh, Pohela Falgun and others. Wearing alta on Durga Puja is a common ritual for Odia and Bengali women.

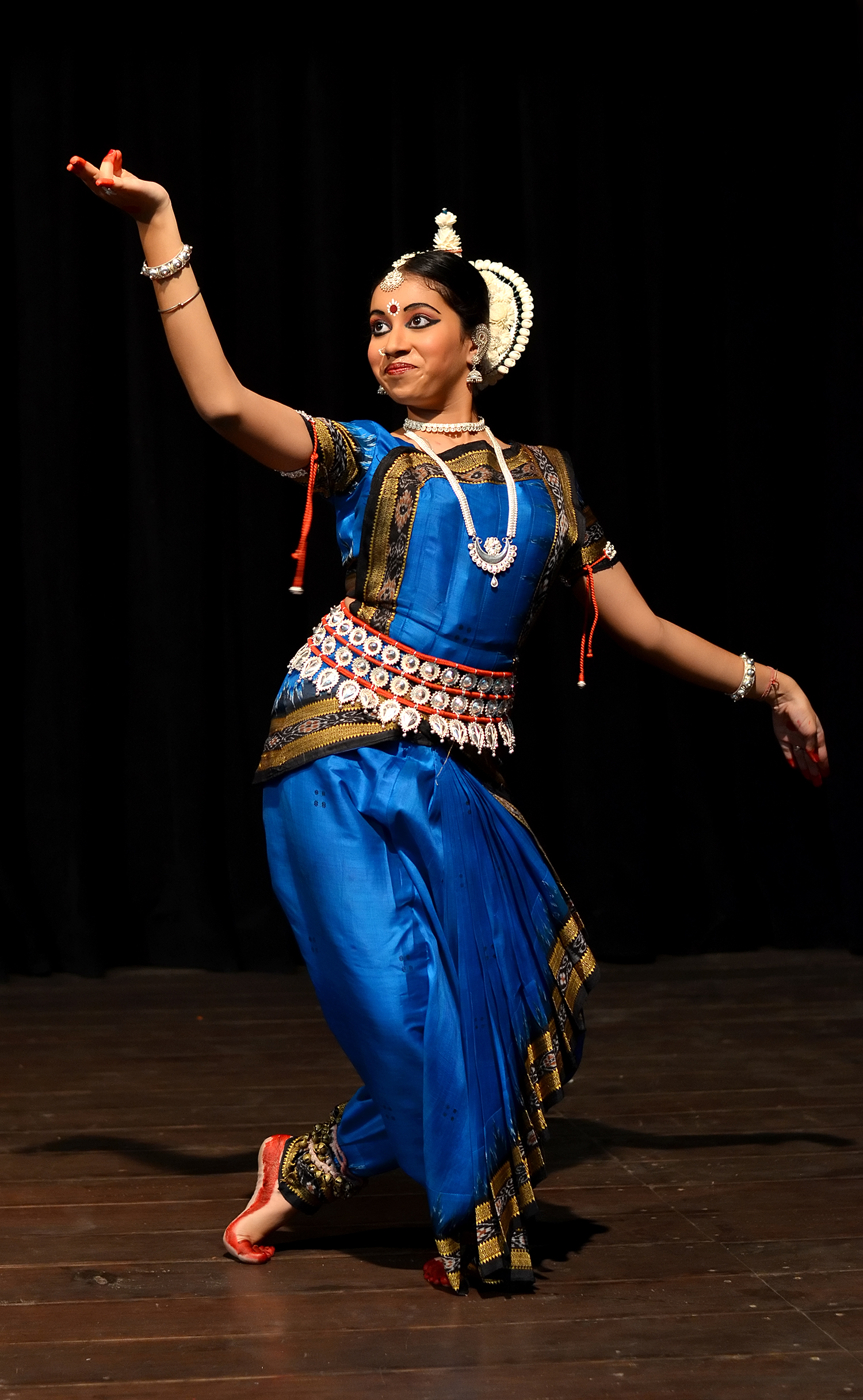
Odissi classical dancer wearing alta on her hands and feet

It can be commonly seen worn by Odissi classical dancers on hands and feet while performing. It is applied to women's feet as an auspicious symbol during Raja (Mithun Sankranti), which is a three-day festival celebrating womanhood (menstruation).

It is known as parani in south India and in a very diluted form Parani is also known as vasantam, meaning spring. It is worn by women and children on festive occasions, and also by Bharatanatyam, Kuchipudi and Mohiniattam dancers.

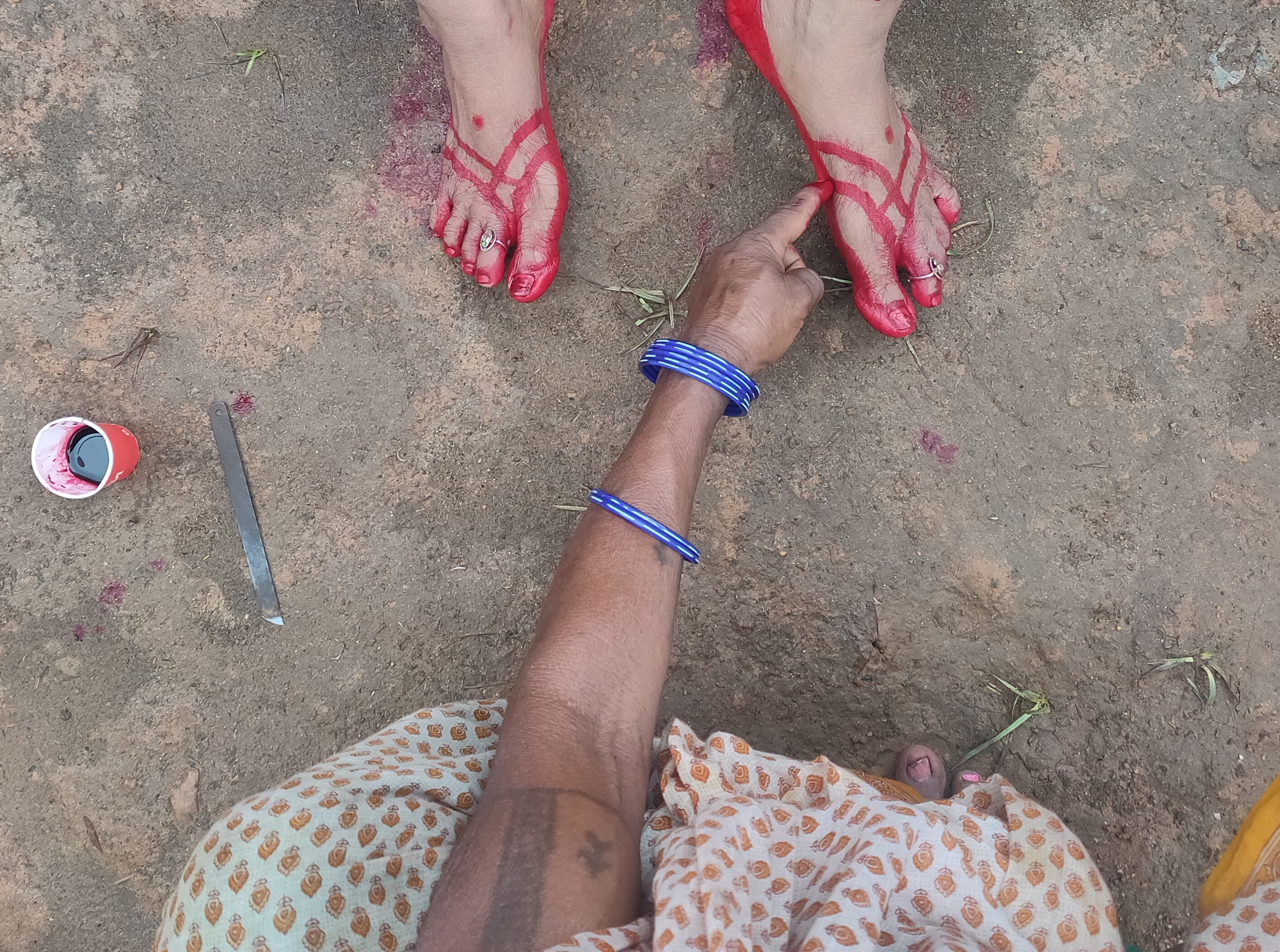
Alta being applied during Hazamat ceremony in Bihar

In Nepal it is known as alah and it is an important part of weddings, religious rituals and festivals.

== See also ==
- Henna
- Mehndi
- Masonjoany
- Kumkum
- Sindoor
