= Bou Bhat =

Post-wedding ritual in Bengali culture

A Bou bhat (Bengali: বউ ভাত lit: "bride feast") is a post-wedding ritual held usually one or two days after a Bengali wedding. In this ceremony a party is hosted by the groom's father or family, where both the bride's and groom's family members and friends are invited.

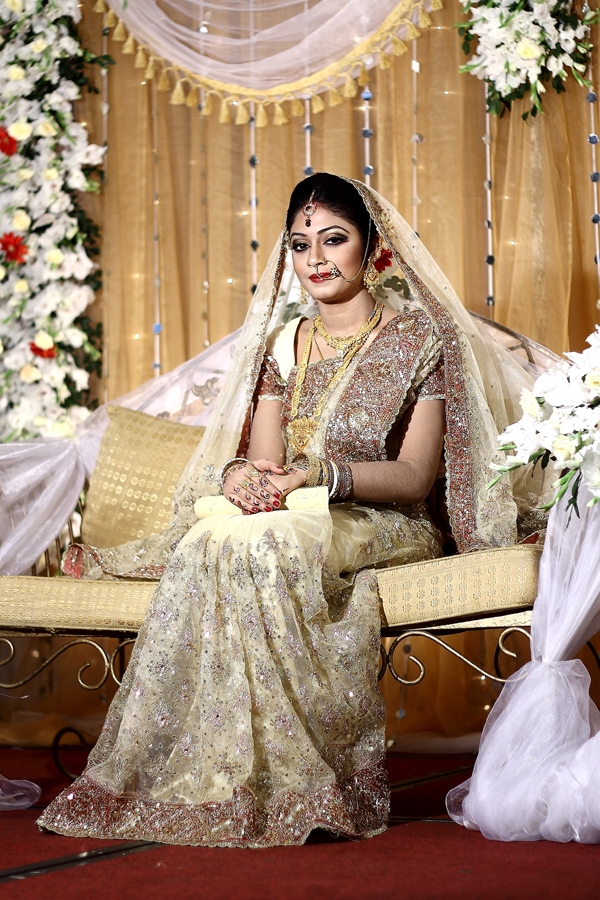
A Bengali bride on her Bou Bhat in Dhaka, Bangladesh

In a bou bhat ceremony, bride wears a traditional shari given either by her father or in-laws, while the groom wears a traditional dhoti or shalwar and pair with kurta or sherwani given to him by his in-laws.

The ritual varies from one place to another. In some places, the bride has her first meal in the home of her in-laws during this ceremony. Until bou bhat, her meals usually arrive from a neighbour's house. While in some parts, like in eastern Comilla, firani is held after eight days, called at naiyor.
