= Valaikaapu =

Tamil prenatal ceremony

Valaikaappu (in Tamil: வளைகாப்பு) is a prenatal ceremony or celebration similar to a baby shower, practised as part of Tamil culture by South Indian women from Tamil Nadu and parts of Kanyakumari, as well as regions of Kerala bordering Tamil Nadu, meant to bless a pregnant woman, celebrate her fertility, and prepare the baby and mother-to-be for a safe birth. It is typically held at the 5th month and 7th month of the pregnancy by the mother side of the girl in her mother’s house. It is widely practiced among both the urban and rural populations of the region.

== Etymology ==
The etymology could be related to two Tamil words that mean to protect the bangles: valaiyal (வளையல்) which is typically a glass bangle, and kaapu (காப்பு), which means to protect. The equivalent in Malayalam would be (വള) for bangle.

== History ==
It is related to the more formal traditions of Seemantham or Simantonnayana dating back to the 4th century BCE, documented in the Kalpa Sutras, possibly part of the Jain (Mahavira) and the slightly later, but contemporary, Buddhism traditions (dated earliest to 6th century BCE). It is practiced widely in South India. Valaikaappu was originally a simple ceremony, mainly limited to the exchange of bangles. But as Valaikaappu became more widely practiced, it grew more lavish, and since the 1980s has been celebrated more widely, according to anthropologists who have studied the practice. It is conducted with "magnificence and sumptuousness", with gifts including jewelry, saris, household appliances, and gold ornaments.

== Purpose ==
The mother-to-be's wrists are adorned with glass bangles (red and green) in odd numbers. It is believed that the bangle sound induces the child's senses and brain activity. It is also well-known that fetal hearing begins in the 7th month. Women at the ceremony sing hymns and songs. A paste made of sandalwood and turmeric is applied to the mother-to-be's hands and face to reduce the body heat and calm the mother and baby from fear and anxiety of child birth. The guests then place a garland and bangles on her wrists, shower her with flowers, and bestow well-wishes and prayers for a safe delivery. Another purpose of the ceremony is to honor the pregnant woman and to ensure the birth of a healthy child. After the celebration, the mother-to-be rests at her parents' home for the final weeks of her pregnancy.

== Food at the ceremony ==
According to some Tamil traditions, the mother-to-be is served seven types of rice and sweets. Rice types include tamarind rice, lemon rice, curd rice, mango rice, mint rice, tomato rice, and coconut rice. Sweets served include a variety of payasams (javarisi, paruppu payasam), fruit salad, and sweets like bengal gram laddu, multigrain laddu and gulab jamoon. A healthful laddu made of ginger, palm jaggery (karupatti), omam (carom), and other items is served for good digestion. The feast is centered on the health of the child and the mother-to-be, and not the guests. Vegetarian food is usually served to the guests mainly consisting of rice, sambhar, 3 types of vegetables and a dessert.

== Similar ceremonies ==
Similar ceremonies are held in other parts of India and in Pakistan, including among Bengali (who call it Shaadh), Marathi and Konkani women (who call the ceremony Dohale Jevan [डोहाळे जेवण]), Punjabi women (who call it Godh-Bharai), Sindhi women, and Marwari women. It is similar in concept to Baby Shower.

== Gallery ==
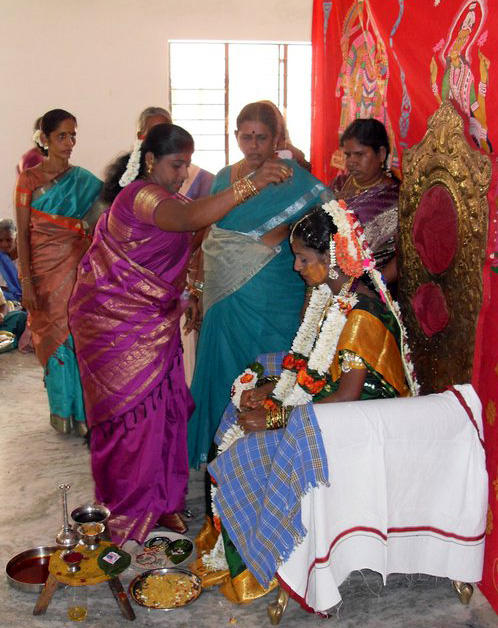
Valaikaappu ceremony

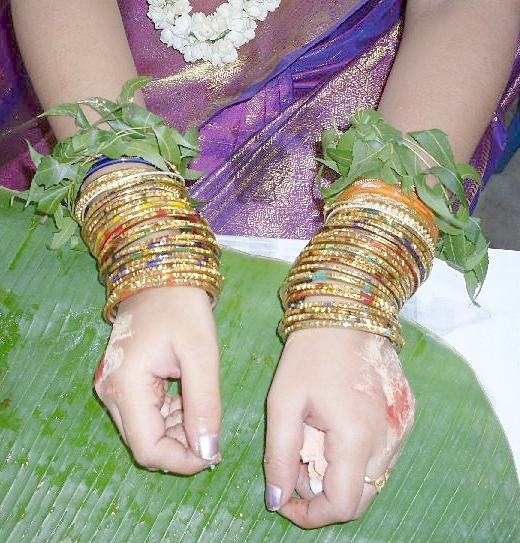
Bangles on Valaikaappu

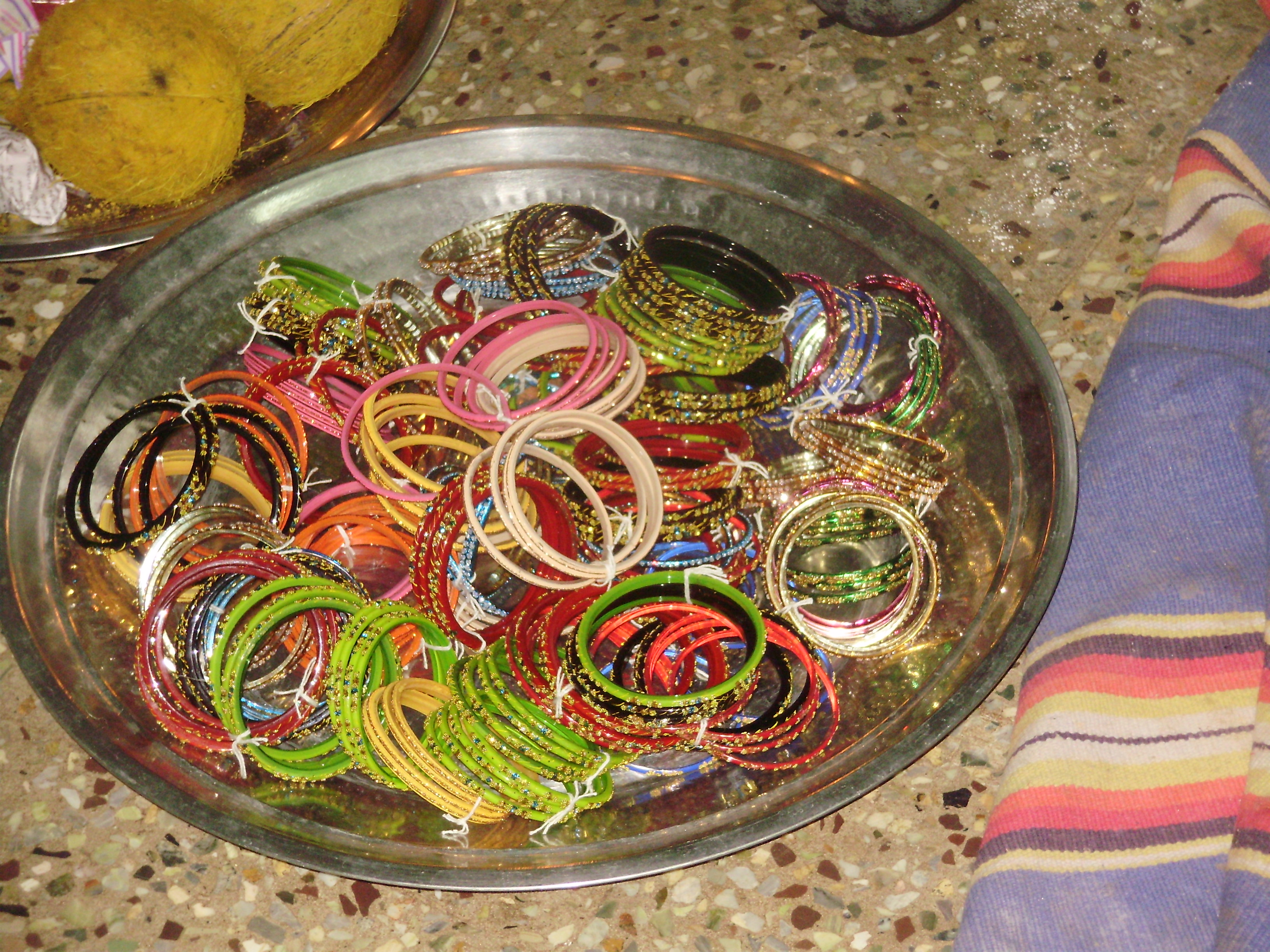
Bangles on Valaikaappu
