= Aanazhagan =

- DVD cover
- Directed by: Thiagarajan
- Written by: Babu-Gopu (dialogues)
- Screenplay by: Thiagarajan
- Story by: P. Samba Siva Rao
- Produced by: S. Balaji
- Starring: Prashanth; Suneha; Vadivelu; Charle; Chinni Jayanth; K. R. Vijaya
- Cinematography: V. Ranga
- Edited by: B. Lenin; V. T. Vijayan
- Music by: Ilaiyaraaja
- Production company: Supreme Films International
- Release date: 11 March 1995
- Running time: 140 minutes
- Country: India
- Language: Tamil

Aanazhagan is a 1995 Indian Tamil-language comedy film directed by Thiagarajan and produced by S. Balaji. The film stars Prashanth, newcomer Suneha, Vadivelu, Charle, and Chinni Jayanth, while K. R. Vijaya, Gandhimathi, and Vaishnavi play supporting roles. It is a remake of the 1955 Bengali film Joy Maa Kali Boarding. The music was composed by Ilaiyaraaja. In the film, Prashanth disguises himself as a woman in order to convince the landlady.

== Plot ==
Raja, Sudhakar, Raghava and Marudhu are good friends who stay together as tenants at a rented house. After being thrown out, they start searching for new accommodation, but no one is willing to rent their house to bachelors. Finally, they learn of a landlady in search of a family as her tenants. A plot is hatched, and all four bachelors dress up to be a family man (Sudhakar), his retarded brother (Raghava), his uncle (Marudhu), and his wife Lakshmi (Raja). Now, Raja's lady love Priya (Suneha) happens to be the landlady's daughter. At one point of time by mistake, the friends inform the landlady that Lakshmi is pregnant. The landlady arranges for Valaikaapu function, followed by a doctor checkup. This bursts into a series of rumbled conflicts, and all hell breaks loose.

== Cast ==
- Prashanth as Raja / Rajalakshmi alias Lucky
- Suneha (Debut) as Priya
- Vadivelu as Marudhu
- Charle as Sudhakar
- Chinni Jayanth as Raghava
- K. R. Vijaya as Landlady
- Gandhimathi as House Owner
- Vaishnavi as Doctor
- Manivannan
- Delhi Ganesh
- Vennira Aadai Moorthy
- Loose Mohan
- Dhamu
- V. K. Ramasamy
- Oru Viral Krishna Rao
- Kumarimuthu as Landlady's Servant
- Karuppu Subbiah
- Vellai Subbaiah
- Bayilvan Ranganathan
- Kazan Khan

== Production ==
T. R. Rajendran was initially supposed to direct this film; since he fell down and got hit hard and he was in very busy schedule with four films, he was replaced by Thiagarajan. Prashanth appeared in drag role in Aanazhagan and noted the most daunting aspects of the role were the "waxing, the threading, the works" as well as "wearing a sari in summer, doing a bharatanatya sequence in a woman's costume, and getting the nuances and variations right were the other challenges", revealing his mother had assisted him. The actor was also involved in the production of the film. The voice for Prashanth's female character Rajalakshmi was given by the famous dubbing artiste Durga Sundararajan. The film became the first project to have scenes shot in the newly created JJ Studios in 1995.

== Soundtrack ==
The soundtrack was composed by Ilaiyaraaja and lyrics were written by Vaali.

Song	Singer(s)
"Aaacha Paatcha"	Mano, K. S. Chithra
"Arul Kann Paarvai"	K. S. Chithra
"Eley Matchi"	Mano
"Kanne Indru"	Mano, Swarnalatha
"Konjum Pura"	S. Janaki, Mano
"Nillatha Vennila"	Ilaiyaraaja, Swarnalatha
"Poo Choodum"	Uma Ramanan, Sunandha

== Release ==
The film performed average at the box office. Soon after the film's release, Thiagarajan and Prashanth began working on another project titled Padagotti Babu, which eventually did not develop. Likewise, another production by his father during the period, Pulithevan co-starring Manisha Koirala and Sangita, was also stalled.
