= Bizcocho (disambiguation) =

Bizcocho can refer to a cake, a buttery flaky pastry or a cookie.

Bizcocho may also refer to:

- Bizcocho dominicano, a Dominican cake
- Biscocho, Filipino twice-baked bread or cookies
- Biscotti, twice-baked cookie
- Bizcochito, dry cookie flavored with anise, typical of New Mexico

== People ==
- Francisco Bizcocho (born 1951), Spanish footballer
- Otilio Warrington (born 1944), Puerto Rican actor, popularly known as Bizcocho
