= Baby shower =

Prenatal celebration

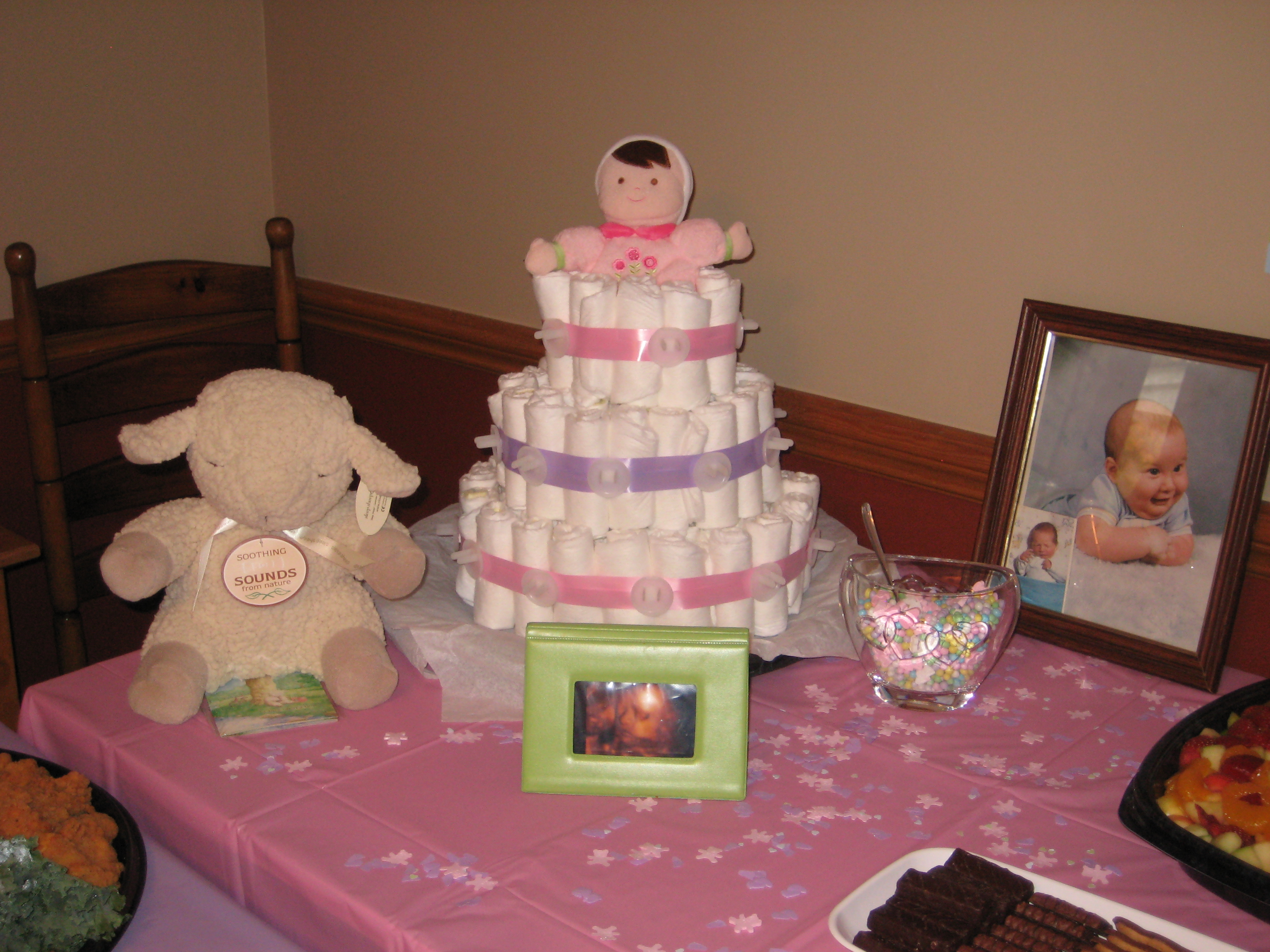
Gifts and a decorative diaper cake on a table at a baby shower

A baby shower is a party to celebrate the delivery or expected birth of a child. Practices vary greatly by country, but it is often a rite of passage that celebrates through giving gifts and spending time together. While the term baby shower is commonly associated with US and Canadian traditions, similar traditions exist across different societies.

== Etymology ==
The term shower is often assumed to mean that the expectant parent is "showered" with gifts. A related event, called a bridal shower, may have derived its name from the custom in the 19th century for the presents to be put inside a parasol, which when opened would "shower" the bride-to-be with gifts.

== Description ==
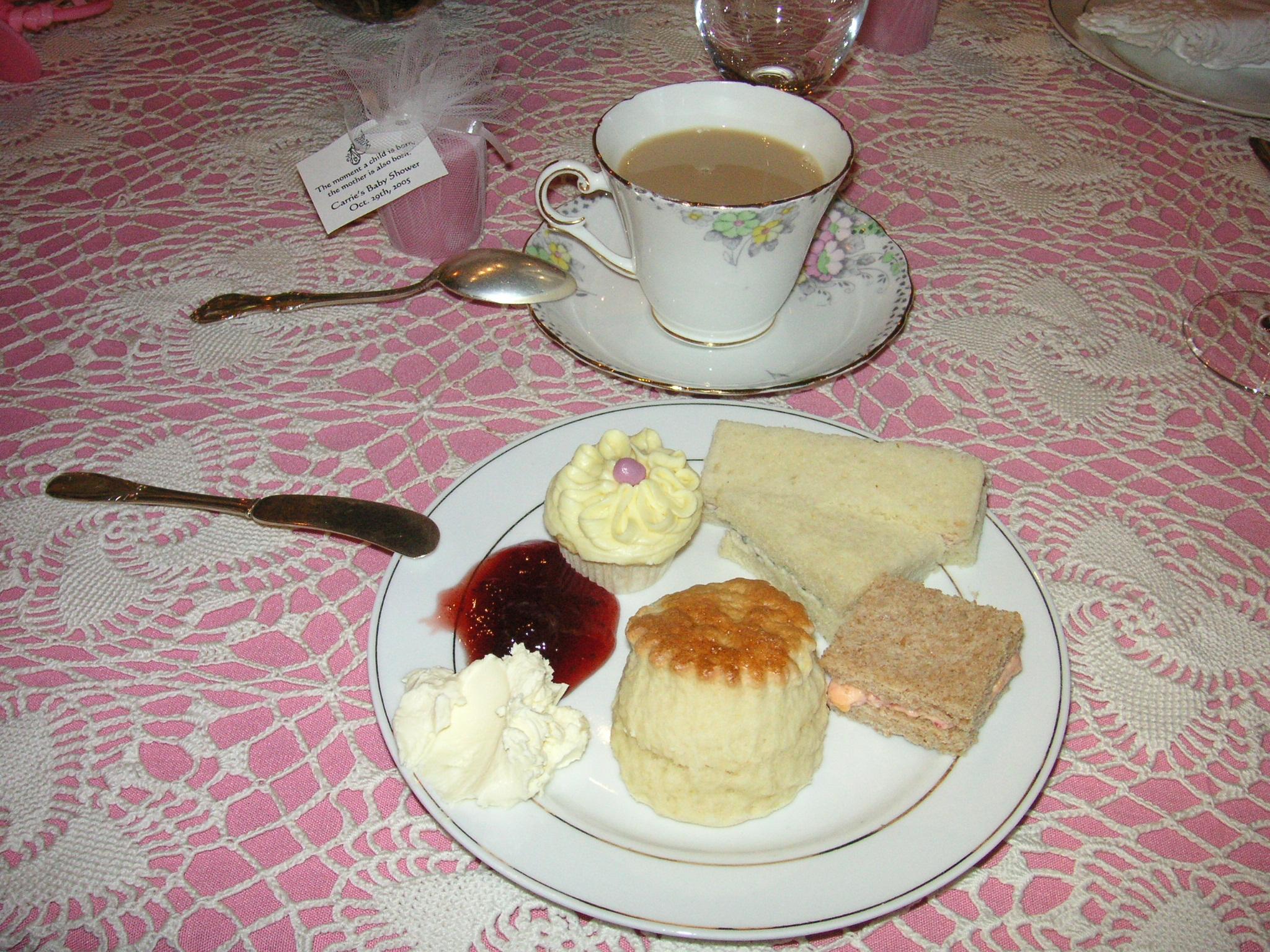
Cake and finger foods are often served at baby showers.

Traditionally, baby showers are given only for the family's first child, and only women are invited to party, though this has changed in recent years, with baby showers being mixed-sex or taking place in the workplace. Smaller showers, or showers in which guests are encouraged to give only diapers or similar necessities, are common for subsequent babies.

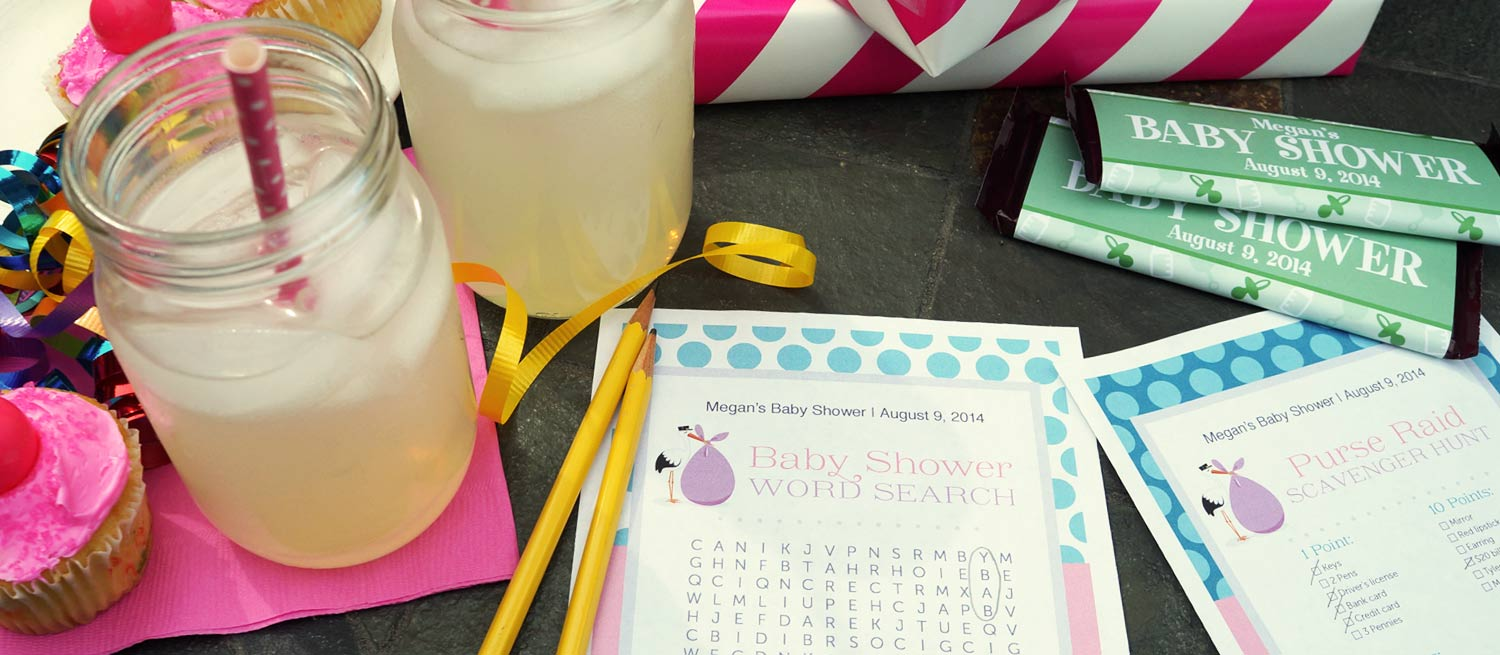
Some baby showers may include games.

Activities at baby showers include gift-giving and playing themed games. Giving gifts is a primary activity. Baby shower games vary, sometimes including standard games such as bingo, and sometimes being pregnancy-themed, such as "guess the mother's measurements" or "guess the baby".

According to etiquette authority Miss Manners, because the party centers on gift-giving, the baby shower is typically arranged and hosted by a close friend rather than a member of the family, since it is considered improper for families to beg for gifts on behalf of their members. The pregnant mother, as well as her mother and mother-in-law, and any sisters and sisters-in-law are commonly considered too closely related to properly host a baby shower, but a more distant family member, such as a cousin, might be accepted. However, this custom varies by country or region and in some it is expected and customary for a close female family member to host the baby shower.

=== Timing ===
Pre-birth baby showers may be held late in the pregnancy, but not usually during the last few weeks, in case of a preterm birth. Many societies do not have pre-birth celebrations. When a baby shower is held after a baby's birth, an invitation to attend the shower may be combined with a baby announcement.

== Gifts ==
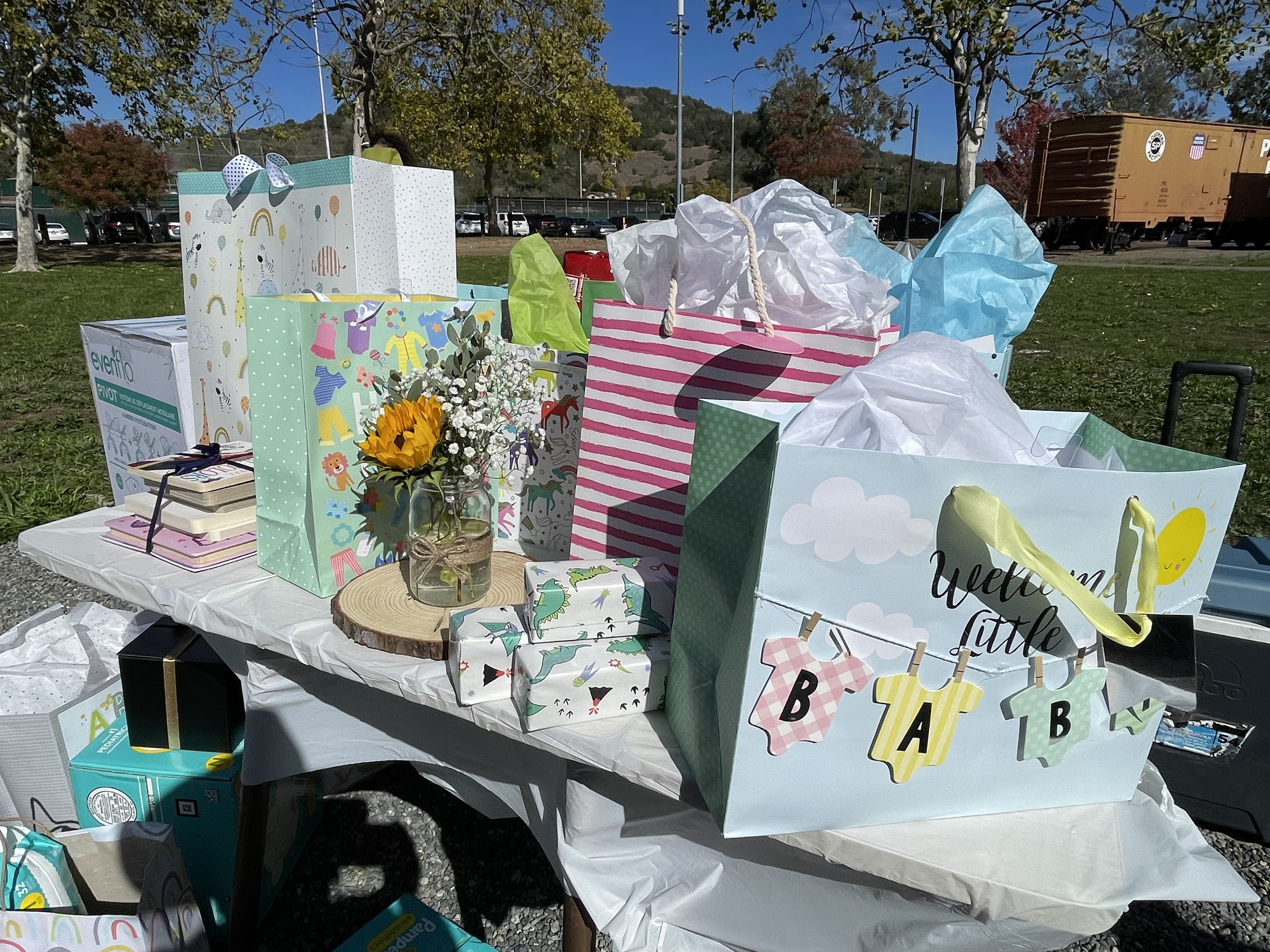
Gifts on a table at a baby shower

Guests may bring small gifts for the expectant parent. Typical gifts related to babies include diapers, blankets, baby bottles, clothes, and toys. It is common to open gifts during the party; sometimes the host will make a game of opening gifts.

== Social significance ==
A baby shower functions as an initial social gathering intended to engage family and community members in a child's future upbringing and education. Attendees utilize the event to provide material support and gifts, which signifies their involvement in the family's social network.

== History ==
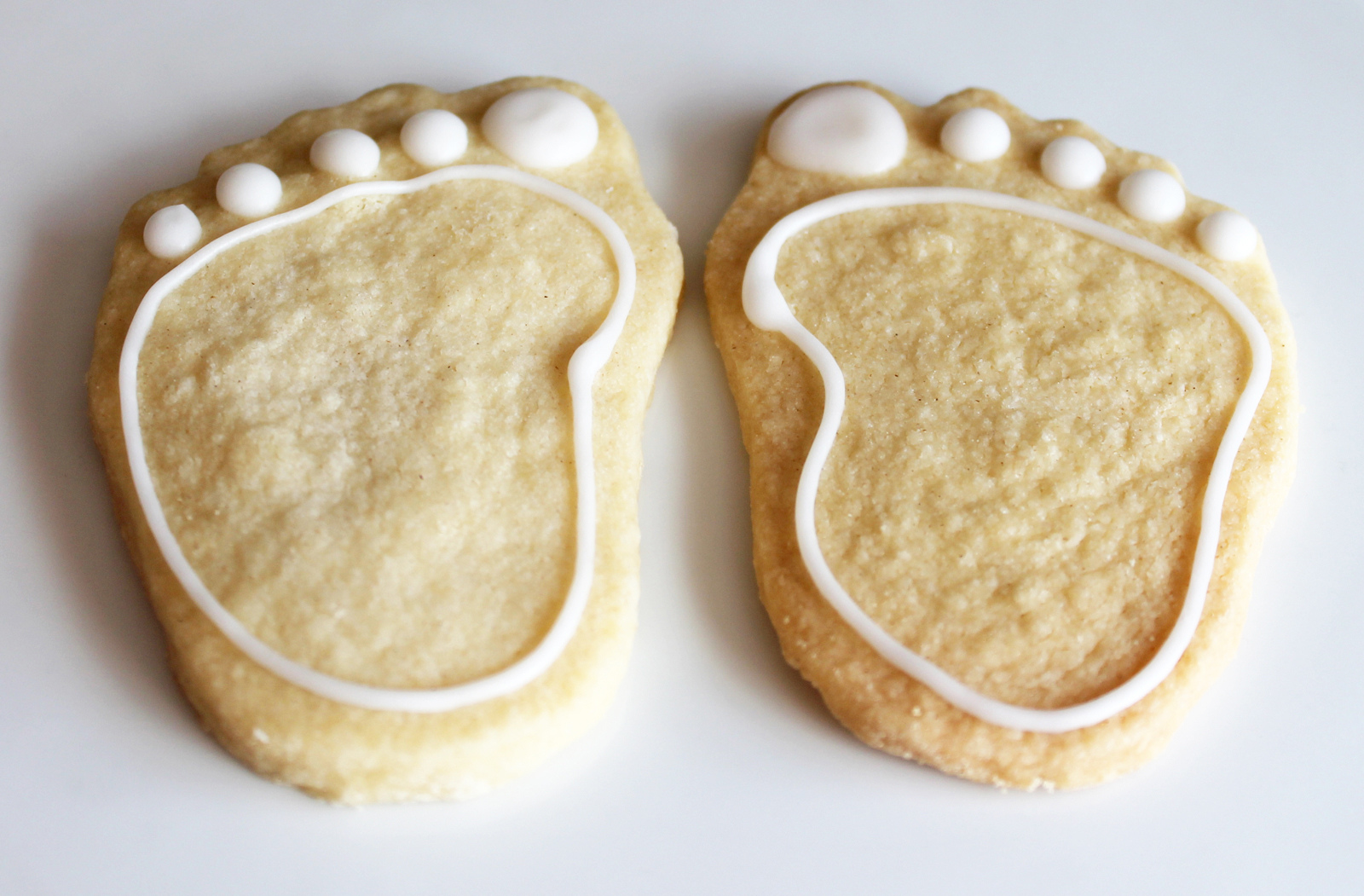
Baby shower shortbread biscuits

Baby showers are relatively new, having become popular only in the middle of the 20th century, but other celebrations and rituals associated with pregnancy and childbirth are both ancient and enduring.

=== Ancient Egypt ===
In ancient Egypt, rituals relating to the birth of a child took place after the event itself. Quite unlike modern baby showers, this involved the mother and the child being separated to "contain and eliminate the pollution of birth" – this may have included visiting local temples or shrines. After this, household rituals may have taken place, but the specifics are hard to study as these are such female-focused events.

=== Ancient and Modern India ===
In India, especially in South India a pregnancy ritual has been following: an event called Simantha, held in the 7th or 8th month. The mother-to-be is showered with dry fruits, sweets and other gifts that help the baby's growth. A musical event to please the baby's ears is the highlight of the ritual, as it was common knowledge that the baby's ears would start functioning within the womb. The ritual prays for a healthy baby and mother, as well as a happy delivery and motherhood.

=== Ancient Greece ===
The ancient Greeks also celebrated pregnancy after the birth, with a shout (oloyge) after the labor has ended, to indicate that "peace had arrived". Five to seven days later, there is a ceremony called Amphidromia, to indicate that the baby had integrated into the household. In wealthy families, the public dekate ceremony, after ten days, indicated the mother's return to society. (The ten-day period is still observed in modern-day Iran.)

=== Medieval Europe ===
Due to the likelihood a mother would die in childbirth, this time was recognized as having a great risk of spiritual danger in addition to the risk of physical danger. Priests would often visit women during labor so they could confess their sins. After the birth, usually on the same day, a baptism ceremony would take place for the baby. In this ceremony, the godparents would give gifts to the child, including a pair of silver spoons.

=== Renaissance Europe ===
Pregnancies at this time were celebrated with many other kinds of birth gifts: functional items, like wooden trays and bowls, as well as paintings, sculptures, and food. Childbirth was seen as almost mystical, and mothers-to-be were often surrounded with references to the Annunciation by way of encouragement and celebration.

=== Victorian Britain and North America ===
Superstitions sometimes led to speculation that a woman might be pregnant, such as two teaspoons being accidentally placed together on a saucer. Gifts were usually hand-made, but the grandmother would give silver, such as a spoon, mug, or porringer. In Britain, the manners of the upper-class (and, later, middle-class) required pregnancy to be treated with discretion: the declining of social invitations was often the only hint given. After the birth, a monthly nurse would be engaged, whose duties included regulating visitors. When the nanny took over, the mother began to resume normal domestic life, and the resumption of the weekly 'at home' afternoon tea an opportunity for female friends to visit. The Christening—usually held when the child was between 8–12 weeks old—was an important social event for the family, godparents and friends.

=== Ethiopian ===
In Ethiopia, there is a cherished tradition known as የአጥር ወፍ አትስማሽ - Ye Atir Wef Atismash. This celebration is held for an expectant mother near the time of childbirth, bringing together family, friends, and loved ones to offer their blessings, encouragement, and joyful wishes as she prepares to welcome her baby.

The phrase የአጥር ወፍ አትስማሽ literally means "May even the bird on the fence not hear your cries of pain." It expresses a heartfelt wish for the mother to experience a safe and smooth delivery with minimal suffering. Traditionally, women make up the majority of the guests at the celebration, as they share experiences, advice, and support with the mother-to-be. However, there is no restriction on men attending the event, and they are also welcome to participate and extend their good wishes to the expectant mother and her growing family.

== Cultural practices ==
Baby showers and other social events to celebrate an impending or recent birth are popular around the world, but not in Western Europe. They are often women-only social gatherings.

In Australia, Canada, New Zealand, and the United States, baby showers are a common tradition.

In the Islamic tradition of Aqiqah, an animal (such as a sheep) is slaughtered anytime after the birth, and the meat is distributed among relatives and the poor. The practice is considered sunnah and is not done universally, a related act of Sadaqah includes guests placing money on or around the infant.

=== United States and Canada ===
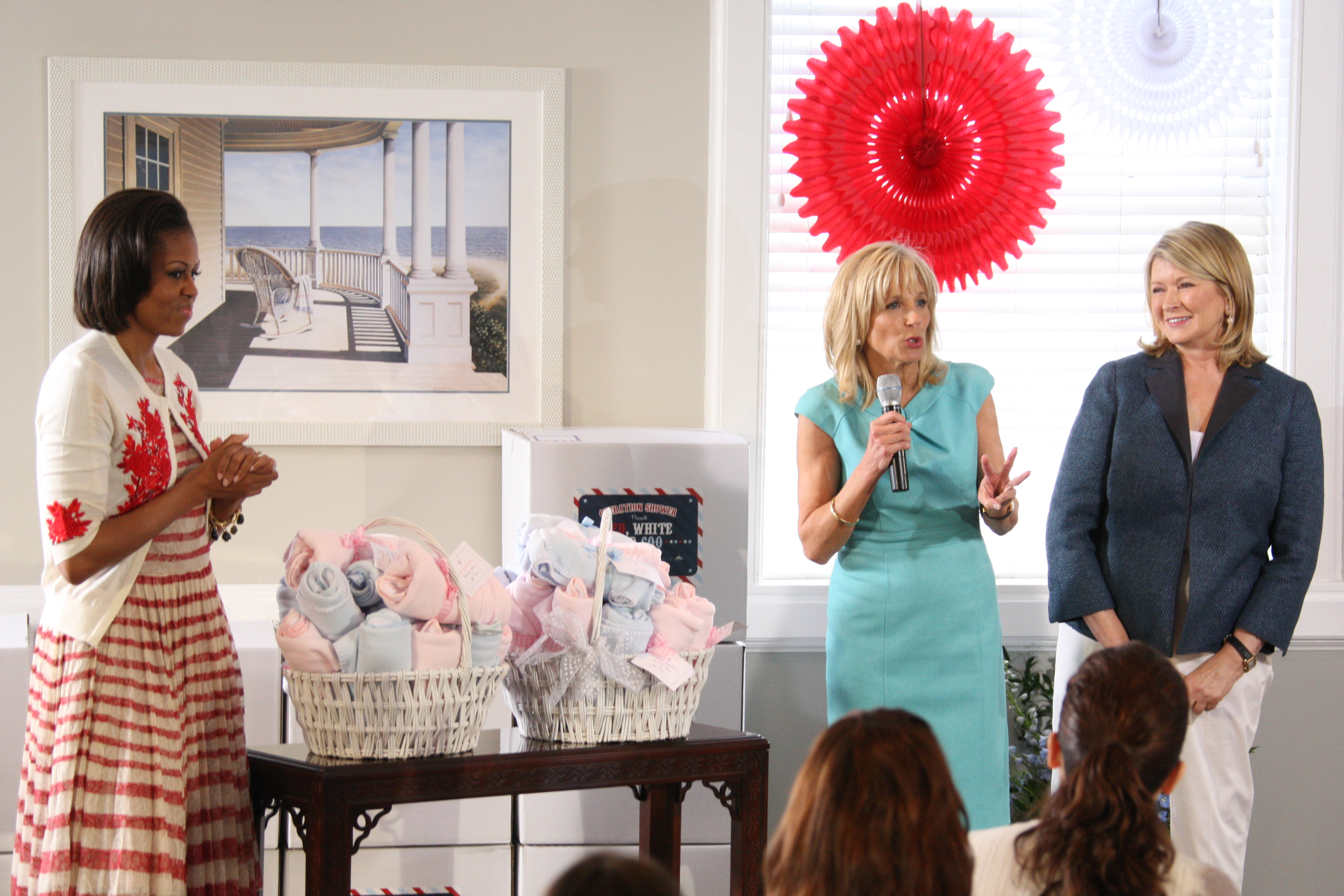
Michelle Obama, Jill Biden, and Martha Stewart host a unit-wide baby shower for the pregnant wives of deployed marines.

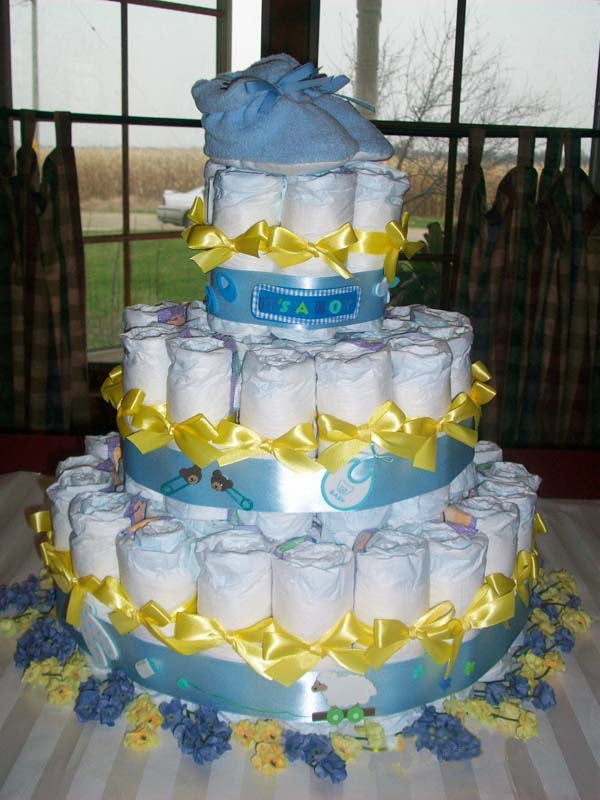
A diaper cake is a party decoration made from diapers, elaborately arranged to look like a fancy tiered cake.

In the United States, the baby shower is the only public event that recognizes a woman's transition into motherhood.

The modern baby shower in the United States started in the late 1940s and the 1950s, as post-war women were expecting the Baby Boomers generation. As in earlier eras, when young women married and were provided with trousseaux, the shower served the function of providing the mother and her home with useful material goods.

While continuing the traditions from the 1950s, modern technology has altered the form a baby shower takes: games can include identifying baby parts on a sonogram. Moreover, although traditional baby showers were female-exclusive, mixed-sex showers have increased in frequency.

Whether and how a gift registry is used depends partly on the family's class, because wealthier families do not depend on the gifts received to care for the baby. Preparing a gift registry is a time-consuming and potentially fun activity for the parents-to-be. It may result in less personal gifts (e.g., the purchase of a store-bought item instead of a handmade one). As with gift registries for other gift-giving occasions, some guests appreciate them, and others do not.

Some families discourage gifts, saying that they want "your presence, not presents", or organizing a different activity, such as a blessing ceremony.

=== Africa ===
In Egypt a baby shower is known as " Sebouh " (سبوع) (sebouh means week) which is usually celebrated one week after birth hence its name. This is usually celebrated with a DJ, much decoration, a food and candy buffet, activities and games.

In South Africa, a baby shower is called a stork party (named after the folk myth that a white stork delivers babies), and typically takes place during the mother's 6th month. Stork parties, usually not attended by men and often organized as a surprise for the mother, involve silliness such as dressing up, and mothers receive gifts of baby supplies.

=== Asia ===
In Armenia, a baby shower is called "qarasunq" (քառասունք) and is celebrated 40 days after the birth. It is a mixed party for all relatives and friends. Guests usually bring gifts for the baby or parents.

In Chinese tradition a baby shower, manyue (满月), is held one month after the baby is born. In China, it is considered unlucky to have a baby shower before the baby is born, and gifts are usually sent after the birth, unrelated to a party.

In Hmong culture, a baby shower is called "Puv Hli", and is held one month after the baby is born. A ceremony would be hosted by the paternal grandparents or the father to welcome the baby to the family by tying the baby's wrist with white yarn and/or strings.

In Iran, a baby shower (Persian:حمام زایمان) is also called a "sismooni party" (Persian:جشن سیسمونی). It is celebrated 1–3 months before the baby's birth. Family and close friends give gifts intended for the baby such as a cot, toys, and baby clothes.

In Mongolia, a baby shower is called "хүүхдийн угаалга" (huuhdyn ugaalga).

In Nepal a baby shower is known as "dahi chiura khuwaune". The mother-to-be is given gifts from her elders and a meal is cooked for her according to her preferences. The pregnant mother is often invited by her relatives to eat meals with them. Pasni is a traditional celebration that often marks a baby boy's 6th month or a baby girl's fifth month, marking the transition to a diet higher in carbohydrates and allowing guests to bestow blessings, and money and other gifts.

In Vietnam, as a superstition no baby shower should be planned before the baby arrives. The baby shower is only organized when it is one month old. The baby shower is known as “Đầy tháng” which means “one full month”. The party is usually organized by the baby’s parents and/or the grandparents (baby’s father’s side). Relatives and close friends are invited. Gifts are welcomed, but try to avoid white color material gifts such as white clothing, white towels, white cloths ... (mourning color)

==== Indian subcontinent ====
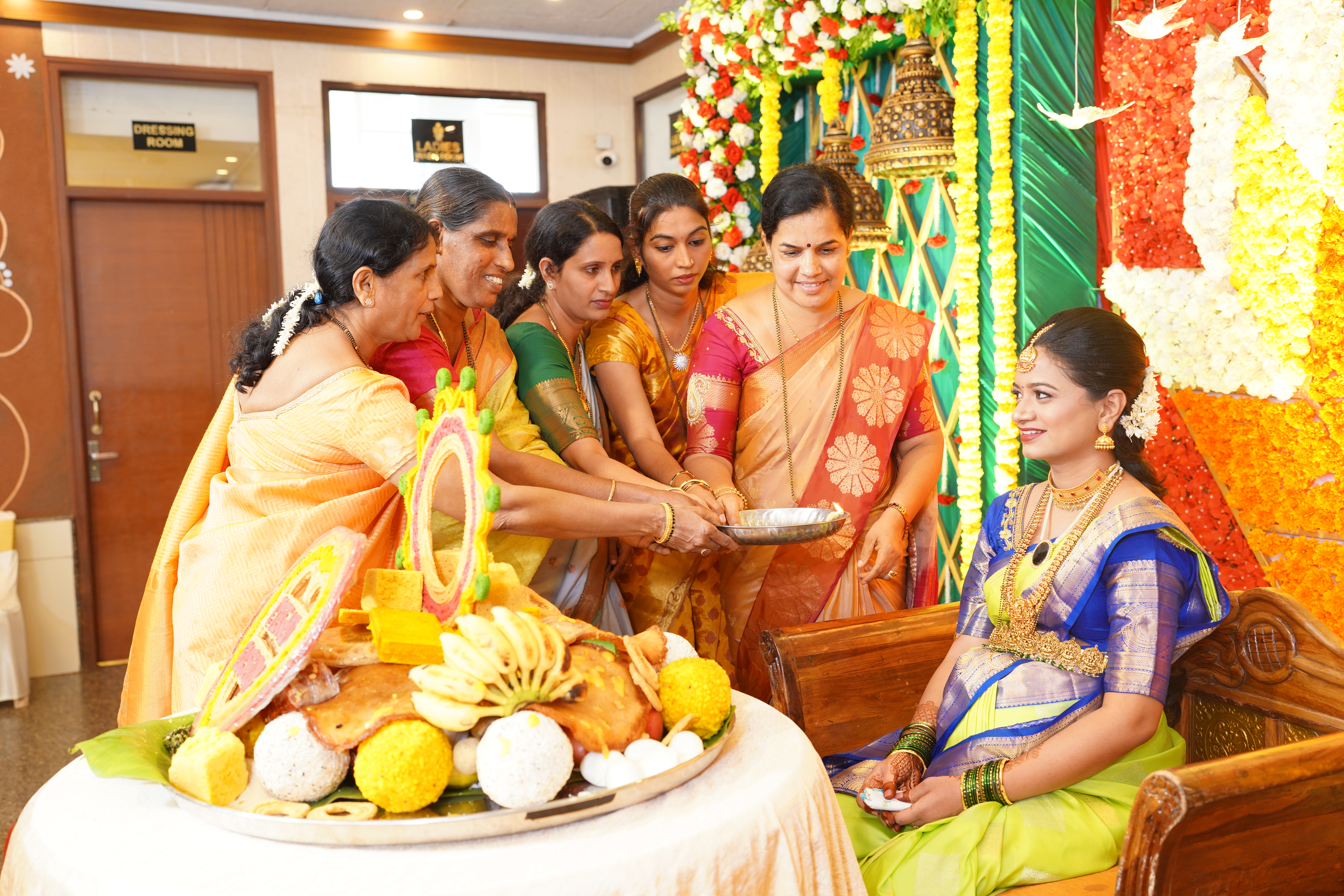
Pregnant woman receiving a blessing at a Sadhbhakshan ceremony

On the Indian subcontinent, baby showers are called by different names depending on the family's community and customs.

In most parts of northern and central India, it is known as godhbharāi (गोदभराई) literally 'filling the lap', while in the Punjab region, it is also known as rīt (ਰੀਤ).

In Maharashtra, the celebration is known as dohāḷe zevaṇ (डोहाळे जेवण).

In West Bengal, in many places a party named shādh (সাধ) or "sadhbhokkhon" (সাধভক্ষণ) is observed on the seventh month of pregnancy. After this, the woman resides in her father's house instead of her husband's until the birth.

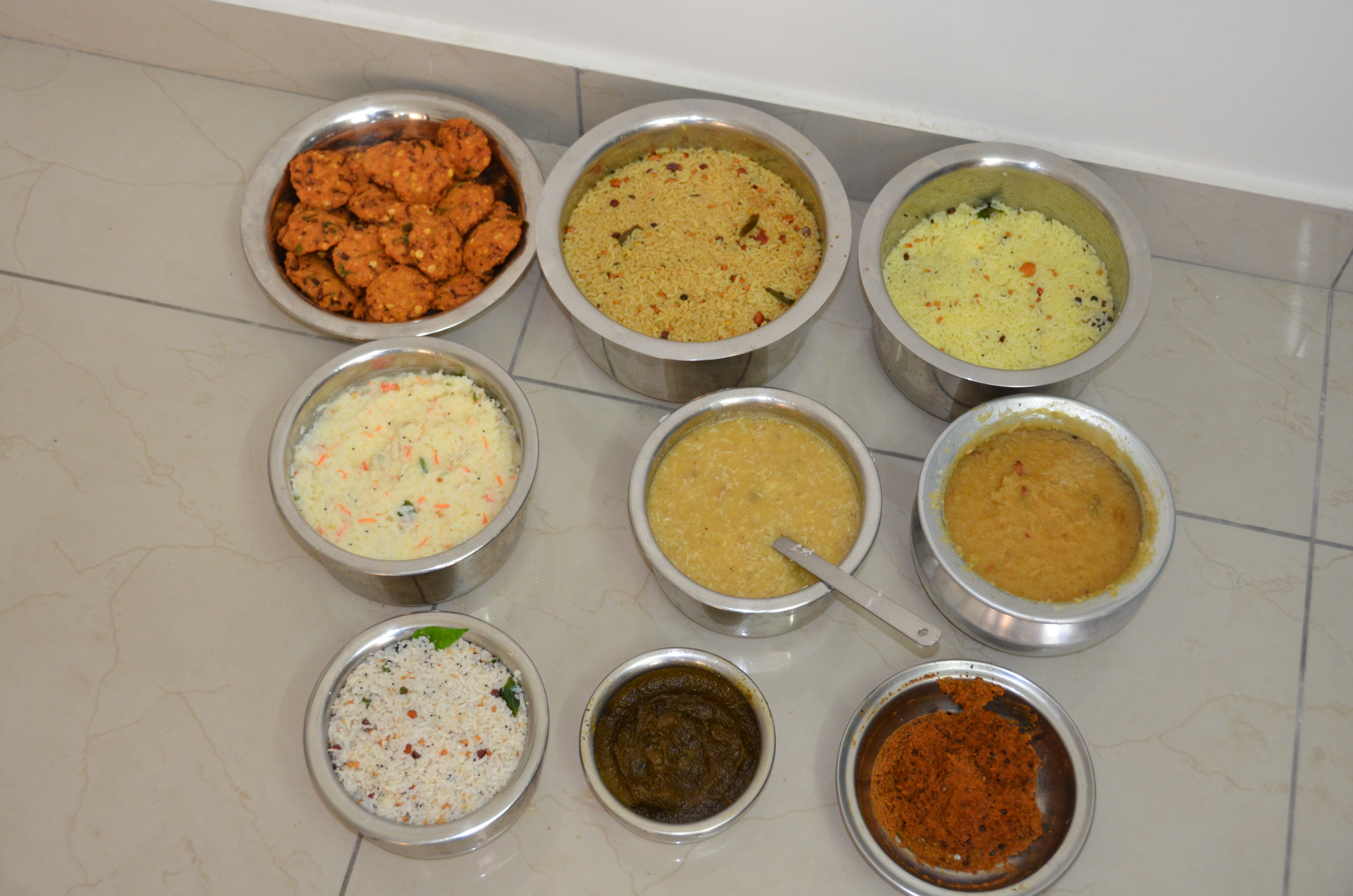
Food served at a Tamil seemantham

In southern India, in Tamil Nadu, its valaikāpu (வலைக்காபு) or pūchūttal (பூச்சூட்டல்), while in Andhra Pradesh, it's called seemantham (సీమంతం). The expecting mother wears bangles and is adorned with flowers.

In Odisha, it's called chitåu khiā (ଚିତଉ ଖିଆ) or suāda khiā (ସୁଆଦ ଖିଆ), usually held in the 7th month of pregnancy.

In Karnataka, it is called kubasa (ಕುಬಸ) or sīmanta (ಸೀಮಂತ) . It is held when the woman is in her 5th, 7th, or 9th month of pregnancy.

In coastal parts of Karnataka, aka Tulunadu (Tulu speaking region), the ceremony is also known as bāyake (ಬಾಯಕೆ). Bāyake in Tulu means desire. It is popularly considered that pregnant women crave fruits and eatables during the pregnancy period; and the ceremony was designed in the olden days to fulfill the desire or food cravings of the mother-to-be.

In Gujarat, it is known as khoḷo bharyo (ખોળો ભરયો) or sīmant (સીમંત), a religious ritual for most Gujarati Hindus during the 5th or 7th month of pregnancy, usually only for the first child. The expectant mother can only go to her father's house for delivery after her seemant. They offer special prayer and food to the goddess "Randal, the wife of the Sun".

In Kerala it is known as puḷikuḍi (പുളികുടി) or vayaṭṭu pongala (വയറ്റു പൊങ്കാല), and is practiced predominantly in the Nair community, though its popularity has spread to other Hindu sects over the years. On an auspicious day, after being massaged with homemade ayurvedic oil the woman has a customary bath with the help of the elderly women in the family. After this, the family deity is worshipped, invoking all the paradevatas (family deities) and a concoction of herbal medicines prepared traditionally, is given to the woman. She is dressed in new clothes and jewellery used for such occasions. A big difference in the western concept of baby shower and Hindu tradition is that the Hindu ceremony is a religious ceremony to pray for the baby's well-being. In most conservative families, gifts are bought for the mother-to-be but not the baby. The baby is showered with gifts only after birth.

In Jain tradition, the baby shower ceremony is often called as "Shreemant". The expectant mother can go to her father's house in the 5th month of pregnancy and has to come back before the baby shower ceremony. After the ceremony the expectant mother cannot go back to her father's house. The ceremony is only performed on Sunday, Tuesday or Thursday of the seventh or ninth month of pregnancy. During the ceremony one of the practice is that the younger brother-in-law of the expectant mother dips his hands in Kumkuma water and slaps the expectant mother seven times on her cheeks and then the expectant mother slaps her younger brother-in-law seven times on his cheeks.

Although these might be celebrated together, they are very different: sīmantham is a religious ceremony, while valaikāppu and pūchūttal are purely social events much like Western baby showers. In a valaikāppu or pūchūttal, music is played and the expectant mother is decked in traditional attire with many flowers and garlands made of jasmine or mogra. A swing is decorated with flowers of her choice, which she uses to sit and swing. At times, symbolic cut-outs of moons and stars are put up. The elderly ladies from the household and community shower blessings on the expectant mother and gifts are given to her.

=== Latin America ===
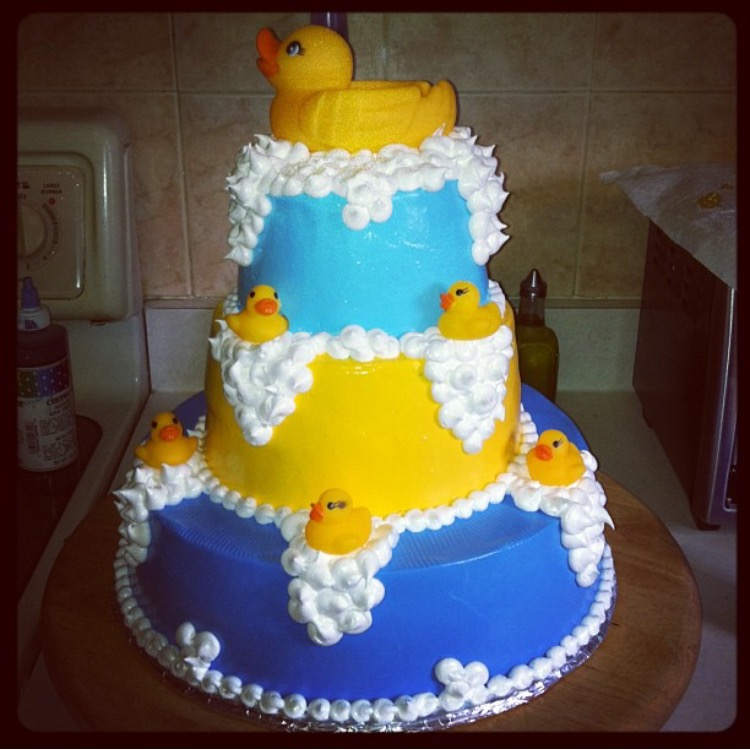
Bizcocho dominicano served at a baby shower

In Brazil, a party called "chá de bebê" (baby tea) is offered before birth.

In Costa Rica, a baby shower party is called té de canastilla ("basket tea"), and multiple events are held for a single pregnancy for the family, co-workers, and friends.

In Guatemala, only women attend this event. Middle-class women usually celebrate more than one baby shower (one with close friends, co-workers, family, etc.).

In Puerto Rico, a baby shower is celebrated anytime after other family members are made aware of the pregnancy, but typically during the last trimester. The grandmother, sisters, or friends of the pregnant mother organize the celebration and invite other relatives and friends. It is not common for men to attend baby showers. The "bendición" (blessing) is bestowed money and other gifts.

=== Europe ===
In Bulgaria, as a superstition, no baby gifts are given to the family before the baby's birth. However, family and friends give or send unsolicited gifts to the newborn baby, even if some babies are kept from the public for the first 40 days to prevent early infections.

In Italy, a party is held when the expectant mother is three or four months pregnant. Marked by the revelation of the baby's gender to parents, friends, and relatives, this festive gathering features an array of food and music. Symbolically, colored balloons, either pink or blue, are released into the air, signifying the anticipated arrival of a baby girl or boy. Attendees express their well-wishes through the presentation of gifts to the soon-to-be parents; this tradition has been recently imported to Italy, where it was not celebrated before the early 2010s.

In Russia, and Commonwealth of Independent States, there are no baby showers, though some of the younger generation are starting to adopt the custom.

== Baby showers for fathers ==
Some baby showers are directed at fathers. These may be more oriented towards drinking beer, watching sports, fishing, or playing video games. The primary nature of these gifts is diapers and/or diaper-related items. The organization of the diaper party is typically done by the friends of the father-to-be as a way of helping to prepare for the coming child. These parties may be held at local pubs/bars, a friend's house, or the soon-to-be grandfather's house. In the United Kingdom, this is called wetting the baby's head, and is generally more common than baby showers. However, with the growth of American cultural influence – accelerated through celebrities via social media sites like Instagram – baby shower decorations are becoming more common in the United Kingdom. Wetting the baby's head is traditionally when the father celebrates the birth by having a few drinks and getting drunk with a group of friends.

There has been some controversy over these, with Judith Martin calling them a "monstrous imposition", although she was referring to the attitude of demanding gifts and not necessarily the male version of a baby shower.

In Hungary, such an event is called a milking party, and is held by tradition in favor of the mother to be blessed with breast milk for the newborn. Practically, it is the last day-off of the father for some time as he is expected to stay home to help. No similar domestic custom exists for mothers, such as a baby shower. Gifts for the baby are given on the first visit to his/her home. This, due to health concerns, happens at the appropriate and suitable time for each counterpart.

== Names for events ==
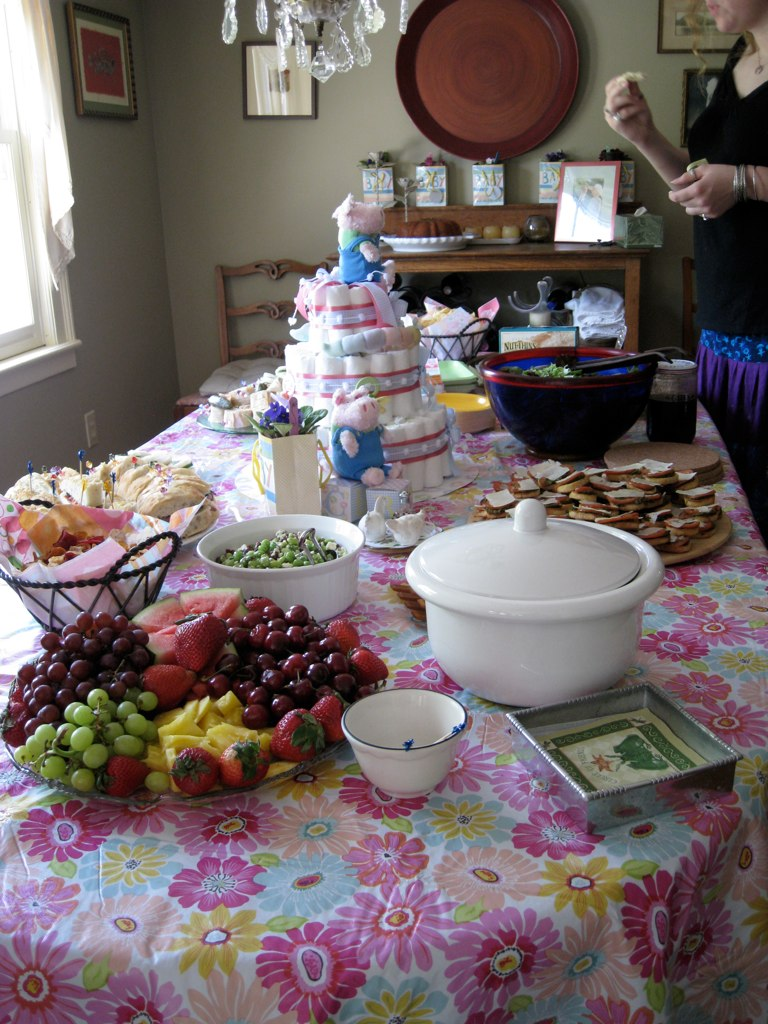
A buffet at a baby shower. The "cake" in the center of the table is made from disposable diapers.

- Diaper shower refers to a small-scale baby shower, generally for subsequent children, when the parents don't need as many baby supplies.
- Grandma's shower refers to a shower at which people bring items for the grandparents to keep at their house, such as a collapsible crib and a changing pad.
- Sprinkles or mistings are small showers for a subsequent child, especially a child who is of a different gender than the previous offspring.
- A sip and see party is a celebration usually planned by the new parents after the baby's birth, so that friends and family can sip on refreshments and meet the new baby.
- An adoption shower is held to celebrate a child's adoption into a family. Such events are called welcome parties when it's an older child being adopted rather than an infant.

== See also ==
- Gender reveal party
- Maternity package (or baby box), another way for parents to acquire the necessities for their first child
- Postpartum confinement, a set of customs for mother and baby immediately following the birth
- Simantonnayana, a Hindu ritual similar to a baby shower
