= Simantonnayana =

Hindu rite of passage during later stage of pregnancy

Simantonnayana (Sanskrit: सीमन्तोन्नयन, Sīmantonnayana) (literally: parting the hair) or Simantha, is the third of the 16 Saṃskāras (sacraments, rites of passage) in the ancient texts of Hinduism. It is observed in the last trimester of pregnancy to wish for safe delivery and is similar to a baby shower.

The authorities are not unanimous whether this saṃskāra should be performed for the first child or it should be performed for every child.

== Description ==
Simantonnayana, also called Simanta or Simantakarana, literally means "parting the hair upwards". The significance of the ritual is to wish a healthy development of the baby and safe delivery to the mother.

Simantonnayana ritual is described in many Gryhasutra texts, but Kane states that there is great divergence in details, which may be because the rite of passage emerged in more a recent era, before it receded into the background. The texts do not agree on whether this rite of passage was to be celebrated before or after pumsavana, early or late stage of pregnancy, or the nature of ritual celebrations. The texts also disagree whether Simantonnayana was a rite of passage of the baby or of the pregnant woman, the former implying it must be repeated for every baby while the latter implying it was to be observed once for the woman with her first pregnancy.

The common element was the husband and wife getting together, with friends and family, then he parts her hair upwards at least three times. In modern times, the "parting hair" rite of passage is rarely observed, and when observed it is called Atha-gulem and done in the 8th month, with flowers and fruits, to cheer the woman in the late stages of her pregnancy.

The ritual has more commonly evolved into a ritual that shares characteristics of a baby shower, where the friends and relatives of the woman meet, acknowledge and satisfy the food cravings of the expectant woman, and give gifts to the mother and the baby in 7th or 8th month of pregnancy. Yåjñavalkya Smriti verse 3.79 asserts that the desires of the pregnant woman should be satisfied for healthy development of the baby, to prevent miscarriage and her health. This rite of passage is regionally called by various names, such as Seemant, Godh bharai, Seemantham or Valaikaapu.

== Ceremony ==
According to the Paraskara Gryha Sutra, at the beginning of the ceremony, the pregnant wife seats on a soft chair and with caressing attention, the husband himself parts her hairs upwards from the forehead three times, first with a bunch containing an even number of unripe udumbara (Ficus racemosa) fruits and three bunches of darbha grass, next with a porcupines quill having three white spots and finally with a stick of the Viratara wood and a full spindle, chanting each time three Mahavyahrtis (great mystical mantras), Bhur, Bhuvah and Svah. But according to Baudhayana different two verses are chanted.

After the Simantonnayana ritual and until the birth, the woman is expected to not overexert herself, her husband is expected to be by her and not to travel to distant lands.

== Regional names ==
Simantonnayana is known by different names all over India. In the Hindi belt, it is called Godh-Bharai or Seemant while in South India, it is known by the name Seemantham, colloquially Valaikappu in Tamil speaking regions. Depending upon the month of pregnancy it is performed, the terms used are Panchmāsa (fifth month), Satmāsā (seventh month) & Athamāsā (eighth month). For example term Athamāsā is common in Rajasthan, while Satmāsā in Uttar Pradesh.

In Dogri language, the terms Thoaa and Reetā are common. In Konkani and Marathi (probably in Khandeshi language also) the same ceremony is called Dohale-Jevan. In Marathi, term Choli Pangarana and in Kannada, term Kubsa todasodu is used.

In Bengal, the name Shaadh/Shaadh is common while in Odisha, Chitau Khiaa or Suaada Khiaa is popular. The names Shimant and Khodo bharvano is common in the state Gujarat.

== See also ==
- Saṃskāra
- Sadhbhakshan
