= Dadchelor party =

Baby shower for fathers-to-be

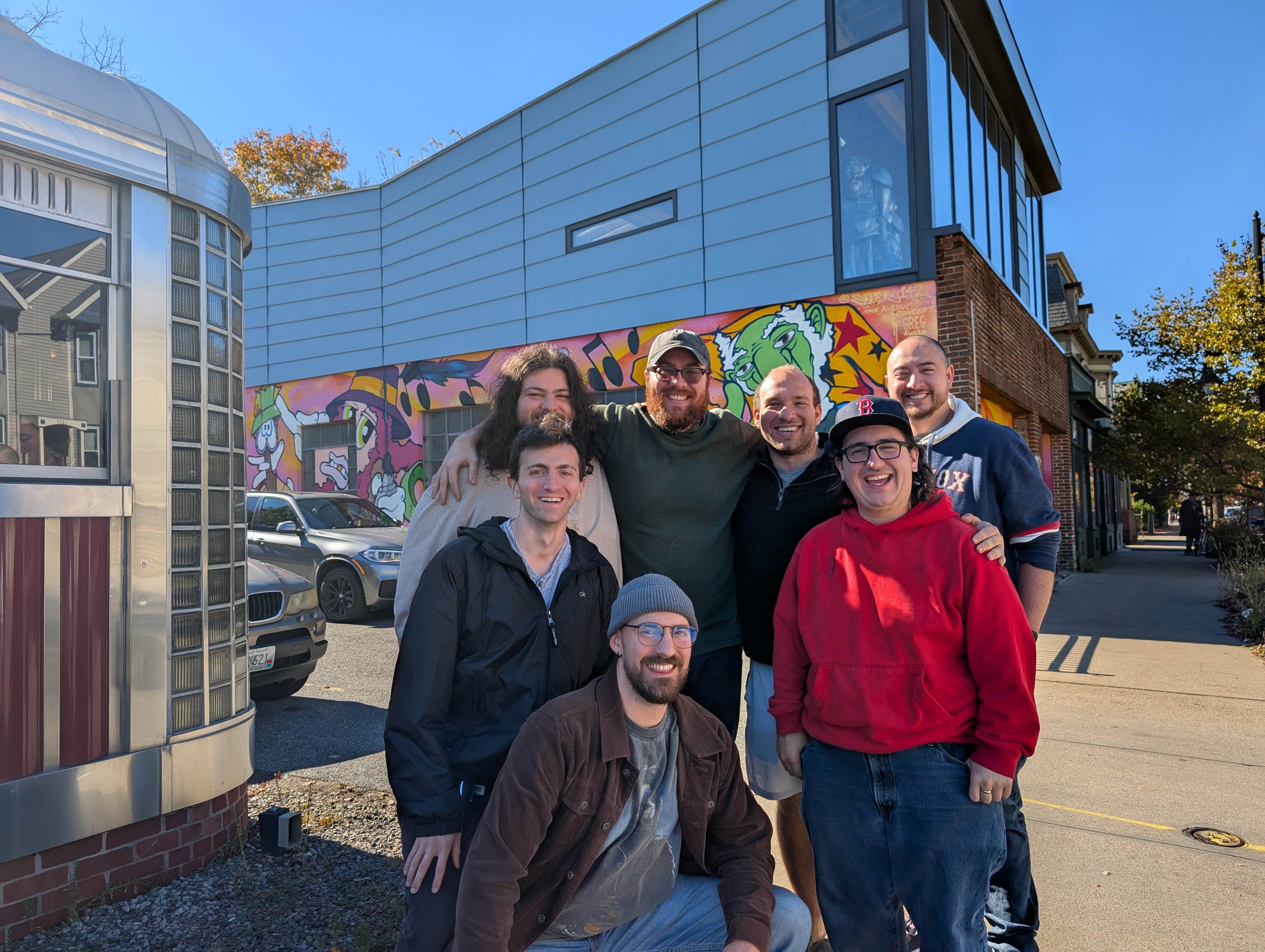
A group of friends on a dadchelor party outing.

A dadchelor party, man shower or baby stag is a baby shower for men. It is a celebration of the birth or expected birth of a child, and the transformation of a man into a father. However, the focus tends to be more on allowing the expectant father to have fun before the arrival of the baby. The party usually consists of gift-giving and drinking as well as other hobbies that the future father enjoys, and may be organised by the father himself or his friends.

== History ==
Earliest mentions of this 21st century concept start in the late 2000s, but the trend emerged more prominently in 2011. In the years before this, baby showers often revolved around mothers-to-be, as they are physically affected by the pregnancy and childbirth.

In recent years, with improving gender equality, men have started to hold baby showers or "dadchelor parties" as their own form of enjoyment and celebration.

== Description ==
The dadchelor party is a way to celebrate first-time fathers and to provide recognition as they enter parenthood. These parties allow the father-to-be to 'let loose" before the baby is born. They consist of stereotypically masculine activities to celebrate the father-to-be's promotion to fatherhood. These parties can also be viewed as the "one last pre-fatherhood bash." Dadchelor parties can be an extensive celebration, or a simple party.

== Gifts ==
The exchange of gifts at a dadchelor party is optional but often encouraged. Guests will bring gifts that contribute to their night of bonding, or may even pay for the dad-to-be and his travel expenses. Gifts also are exchanged for alcoholic beverages, for example, "Chuggies for Huggies," where the guests bring diapers in exchange for alcohol.
