= Bizcocho dominicano =

Cake popular in the Dominican Republic

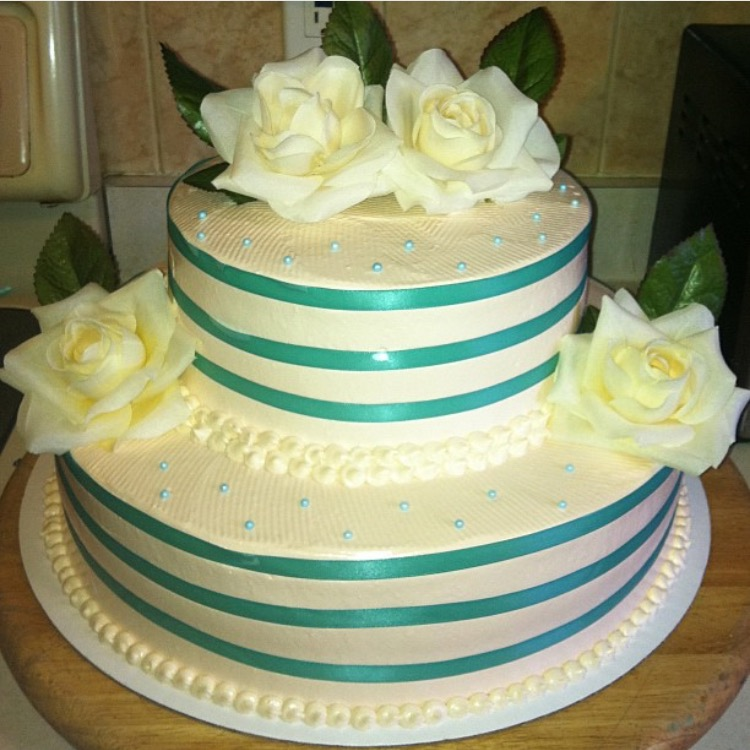
A typical Dominican cake

Bizcocho dominicano, or Dominican cake, is a type of cake popularized by bakeries in the Dominican Republic. The cake is characterized by its moist and airy texture and meringue frosting. It is a popular fixture for special occasions, and is present at most events celebrated by Dominican families, including anniversaries, baby showers, communions, and birthdays. The cakes can be found at many Dominican American bakeries and are also a popular seller of many successful home businesses.

== Ingredients and flavors ==
Like most cakes, primary ingredients include butter, sugar, baking powder, flour, and eggs. A distinguishing factor of Dominican cake is its Italian meringue icing, known locally as suspiro. Authentic Dominican cake frequently uses orange juice in replace of milk or water to provide moisture, a subtle citrus flavor, and help emulsify the batter. The batter is commonly flavored with vanilla, orange zest and lime zest. Dominican cake is consisting of multiple stacked sheets of cake held together by a tropical filling, usually pineapple jam/paste.

The vanilla used in traditional Dominican cakes is an artificial base clear vanilla, known as Dominican vanilla. It delivers a clean, upfront sweetness without the deep, complex, or earthy background notes found in pure dark vanilla beans. Dominican clear artificial or synthetic vanilla extract tastes intensely sweet and bright with a powerful punch of vanilla flavor that often features soft floral, fruity, or tropical notes.

== Gallery ==
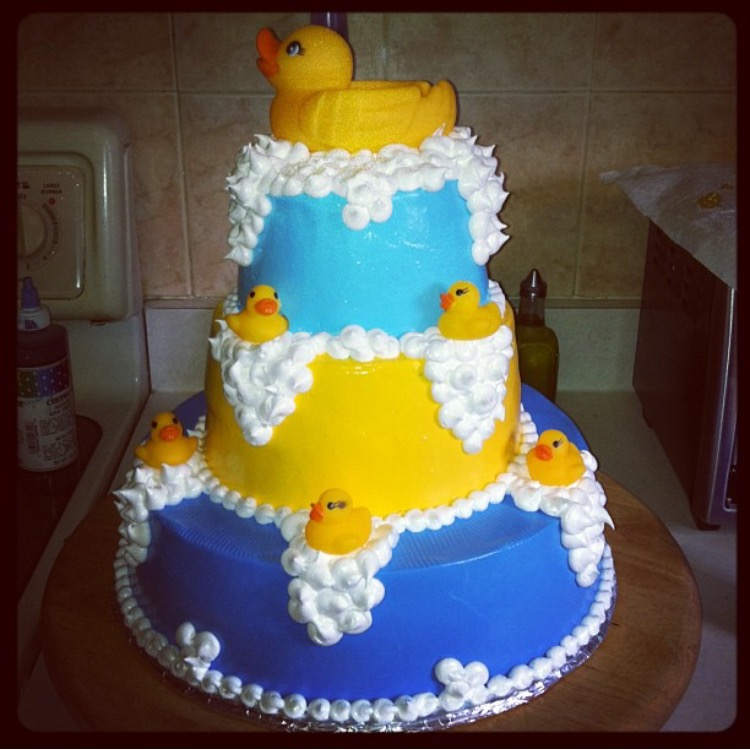
Dominican Baby Shower Cake

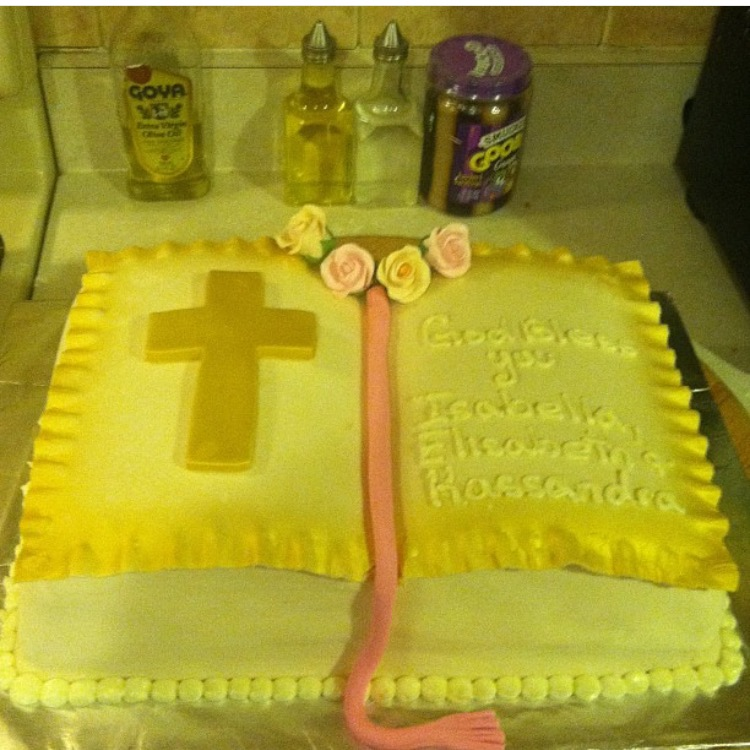
Dominican Communion Cake

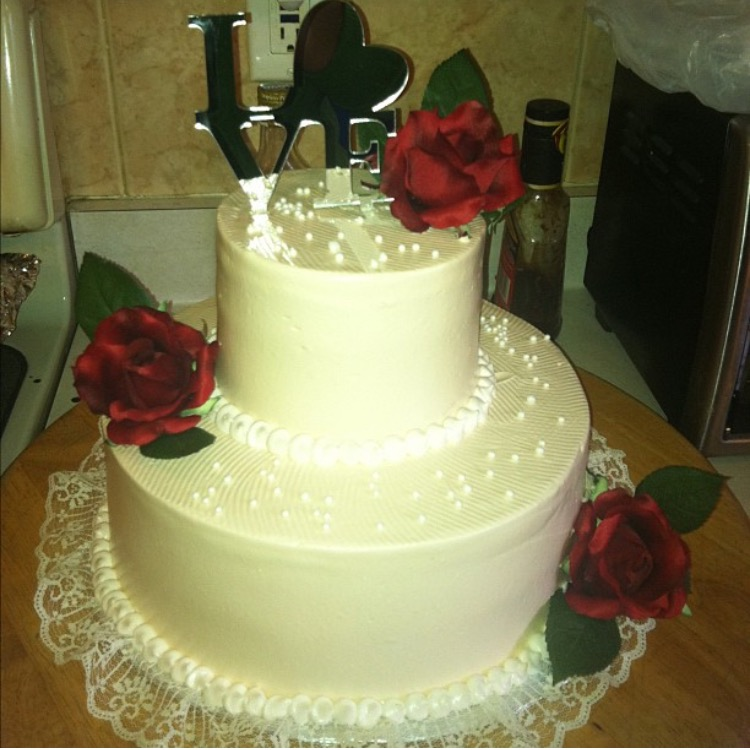
Dominican Anniversary Cake
