= Baby announcement =

Notice to let others know about a new baby

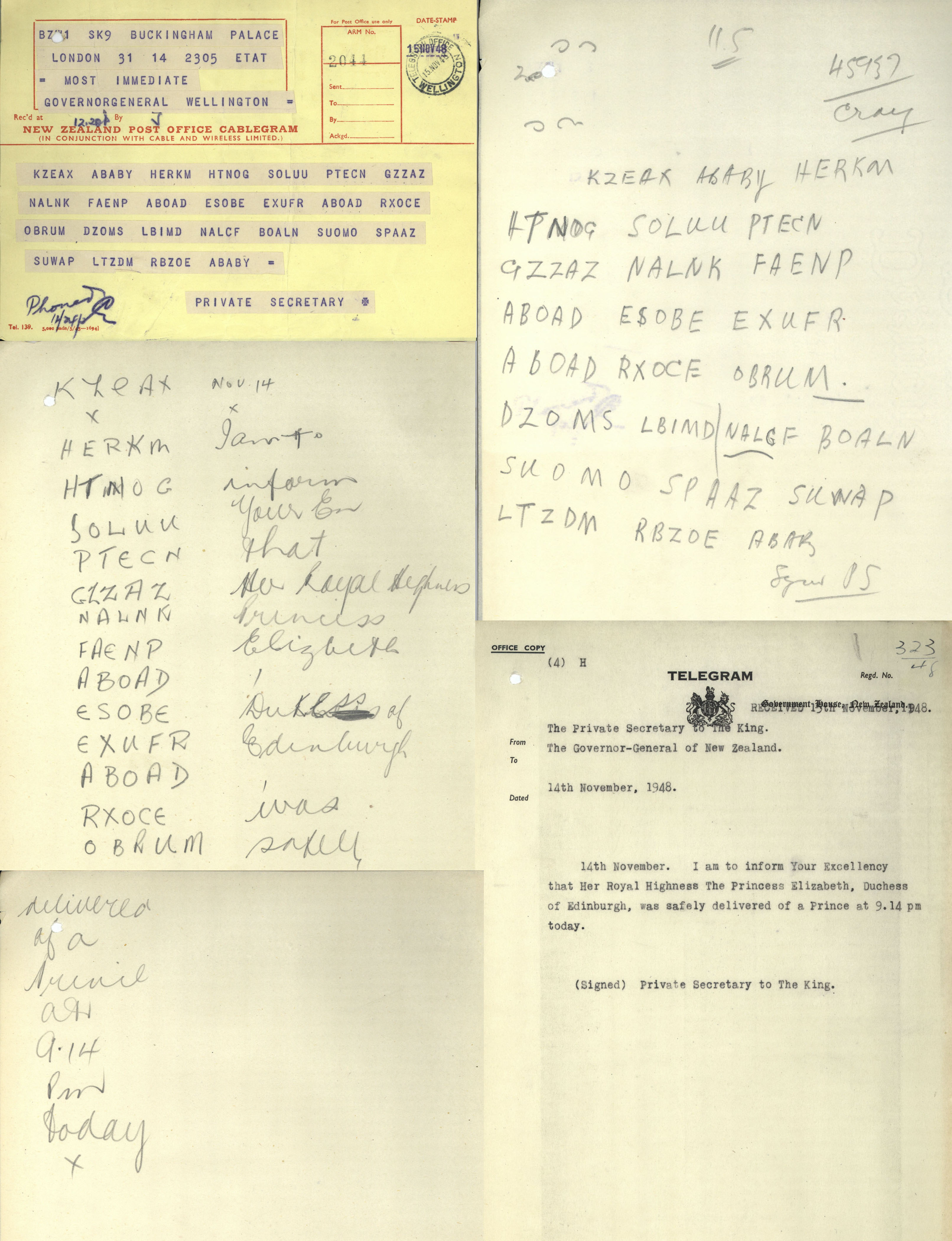
A telegram announcing the birth of Charles III (then Prince Charles of Edinburgh), which read "Her Royal Highness The Princess Elizabeth, Duchess of Edinburgh was safely delivered of a Prince at 9.14 pm today."

A baby announcement or birth announcement is a notice traditionally sent to friends and family by the parents of a baby within the first year of the baby's birth for the primary purpose of alerting friends and family to the birth of the baby. A baby announcement will typically include at least some or all of the following information:

- the baby's name
- one or more pictures of the baby
- the baby's birth date and time
- the baby's birth weight and height
- the location of the baby's birth
- the names of the baby's parents and other family members
- an expression of gratitude by the parents for the arrival of the baby
- an invitation to attend a baby shower for the mother of the baby

British parents may place a birth announcement in their local newspaper. Once a name has been chosen they may send out an American-style card.

== History and origin ==
The birth of a child has been celebrated since before records began and many religions have narratives about the birth of their god or spiritual leader. The earliest newspapers carried birth announcements and announcement cards became commercially available in mid-19th century Britain. Traditionally birth announcements give the names of the child, the time and date of birth, the sex and the weight.
