= Sadhbhakshan =

Traditional Bengali pregnancy ritual

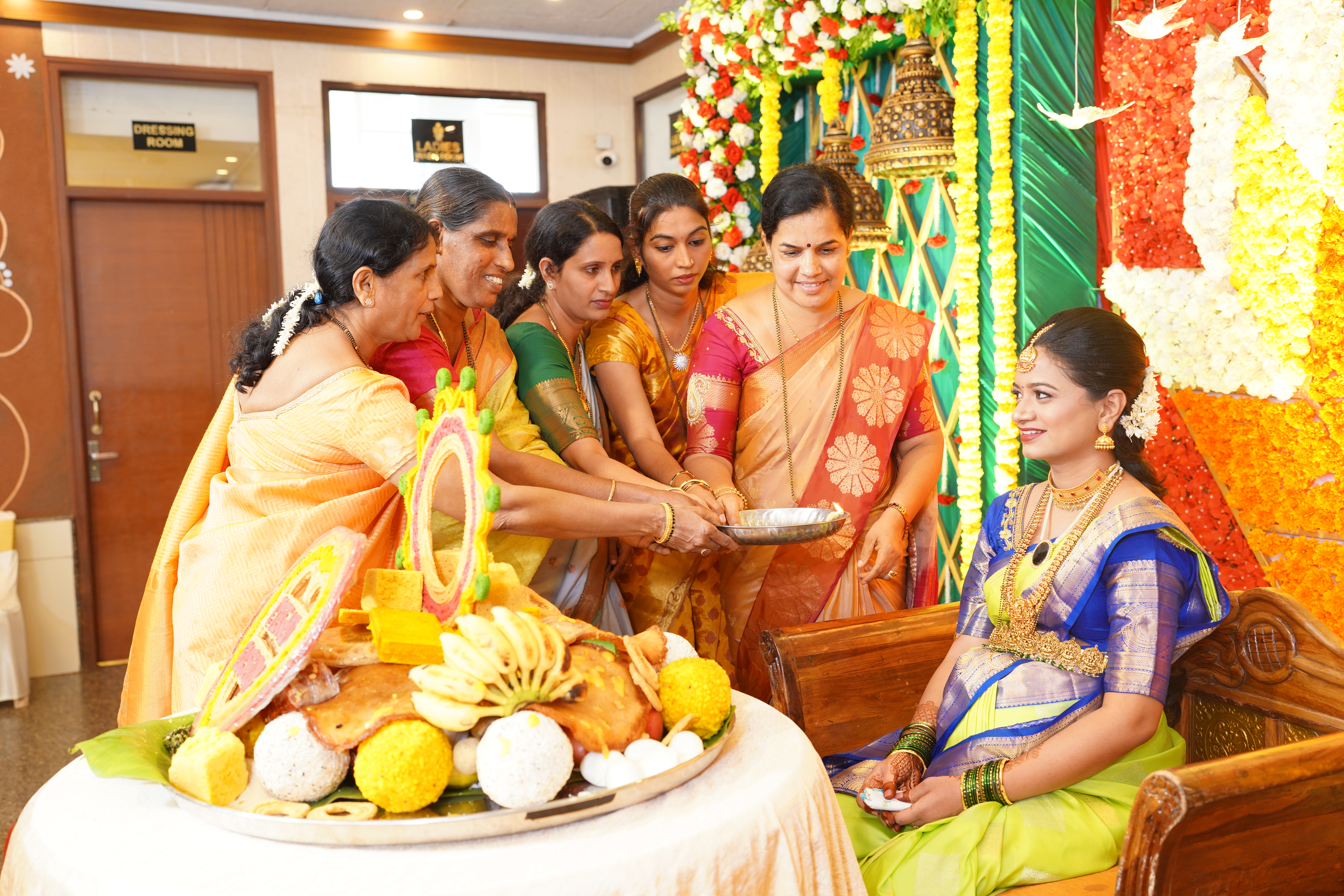
Everyone is blessing the pregnant mother at a Sadhabhakhana ceremony.

Shādh (সাধ) or Shādhbhokkhon (সাধভক্ষণ) is a traditional presgnancy ritual observed by Bengalis. It is performed during the eighth or ninth month of pregnancy, after the expectant mother completes seven months. The ceremony involves feeding the pregnant woman special foods as a gesture of wishing good health for both the mother and the unborn child.

Sadh is a regional variation of Simantonnayana, a ritual of the ancient Indian Samskara. Similar traditions exist in different parts of India, known as Puḷikuḍi (പുളികുടി) or Vayaṭṭa pongala (വയറ്റു പൊങ്കാല) in Kerala, Valaikkāppu (வலைக்காப்பு) in Tamil Nadu, Kubasa (ಕುಬಸ) in Karnataka, Bāyake (ಬಾಯಕೆ) in the coastal part of Karnataka (aka Tulunadu region), Godh Bharāi (गोदभराई) in most of North and Central India, Rīt (ਰੀਤ) in Punjab, Khoḷo Bharyo (ખોળો ભરયો) in Gujarat, Chitåu Khiā (ଚିତଉ ଖିଆ) in Odisha and Ḍohaḷe Zevaṇ (डोहळे जेवण) in Maharashtra.

== Meaning ==
According to Bengali tradition, the term "Sadh Bhakshan" or "Sadh Khawa" literally means a feast or ceremony based on the cravings of a pregnant woman. This event includes a variety of delicious foods, and the expectant mother is also showered with gifts as a symbolic gesture of filling her lap with blessings and joy.

== Importance ==
During pregnancy, issues like nutritional deficiencies in the mother and low birth weight of the baby are common concerns. Additionally, as the baby's weight increases, the mother's body undergoes various physical changes, which, along with a lack of proper care, can sometimes lead to mental distress. To support the expectant mother, the Sadh Bhakshan ceremony includes offering her a variety of nutritious foods, blessings, and gifts such as a new Sari or items of her choice. This not only ensures her physical well-being but also helps maintain her mental health and happiness.

== See also ==
- Samskara (rite of passage)
- Bismillah ceremony
- Aiburo Bhaat
- Furir Bari Iftari
- Bou Bhaat
- Walima
- Mezban
