= Tuareg leatherwork =

Leatherworking traditions associated with Tuareg communities

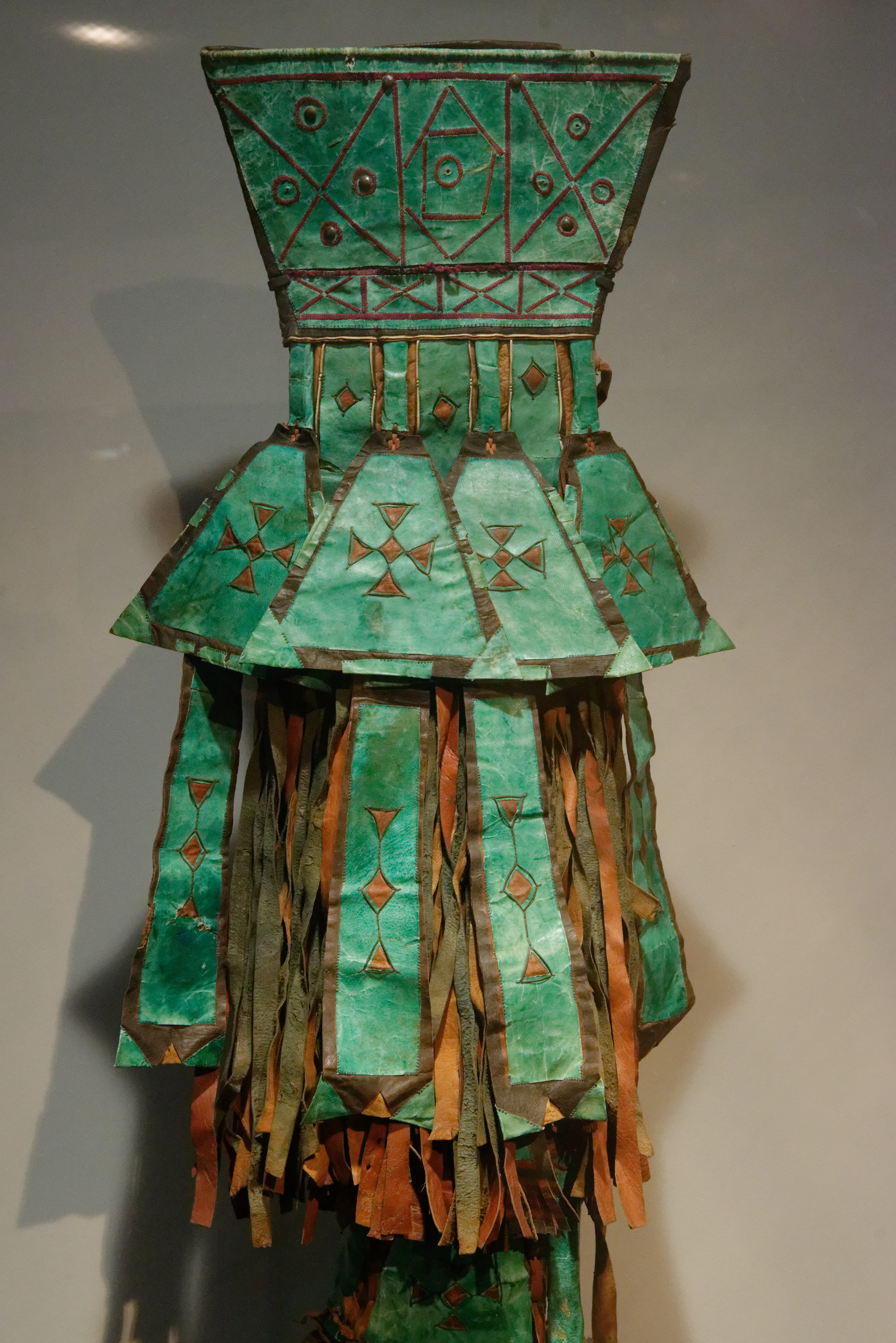
Upper portion of a 19th-century Tuareg dromedary saddlebag from Tassili n'Ajjer, Algeria, made of leather and pigments.

Tuareg leatherwork comprises leather objects made within, for, or in association with Tuareg communities of the Sahara and Sahel. Historical and contemporary examples are documented especially in Niger, Mali, and southern Algeria. They include camel saddles, saddlebags, travel and storage bags, tent furnishings, cushions, containers, weapon sheaths, shields, and small personal cases. Leather is often combined with wood, reed, cotton, metal fittings, pigments, and embroidery.

Production has commonly been associated with inadan, a descent-based occupational group whose members have worked in leather, wood, and metal. Women from Niger and Mali, called tinadan, traditionally cut, dye, sew, and embroider leather, while men craft the wooden and metal components and assemble saddles.

Changes in settlement, patronage, tourism, and long-distance markets have altered production. Workshops still make full-sized saddles, bags, and leather cushions, and some also make miniatures and adapted goods for buyers outside Tuareg society.

Museum records do not always identify the maker of an object classified as Tuareg. A saddlebag collected in the Agadez region, for example, is recorded as the work of Hausa women for Tuareg use.

== Scope and terminology ==
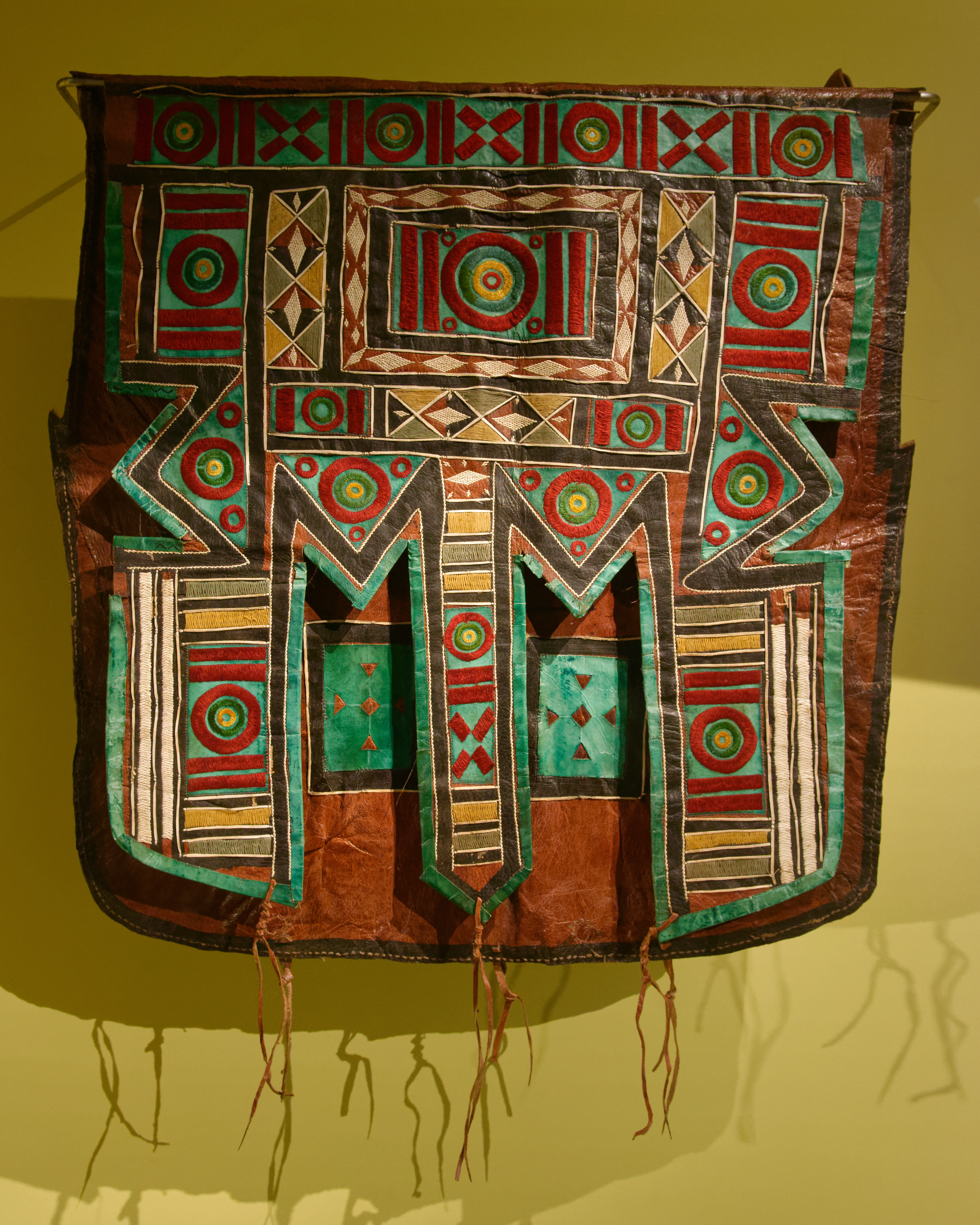
Early 20th-century camel saddlebag from the Agadez Region of Niger, made by Hausa women for Tuareg use. It is made of leather and cotton and decorated with pigments and embroidery.

"Tuareg leatherwork" is a collective description for leather objects associated with Tuareg makers or users. Museum catalogues distinguish, where information is available, between the community of the maker and that of the user. The Hausa-made Agadez saddlebag is one documented example of an object classified by its Tuareg use rather than solely by the identity of its makers.

Spellings of occupational and object names vary because the Tuareg languages form a group of related varieties and have been transcribed in several ways. The artisan group appears as inadan or inaden in English; terms for women include tinadan and tineden. Older anthropological writing often described the group as a caste. Nur instead uses "descent-based occupational group" and cautions that the term caste can imply a uniformity and compulsion that do not match the varied careers of individual inadan.

Museum catalogues and older studies chiefly discuss decorated saddles, bags, jewelry, weapons, tent furnishings, and leather embroidery. Recent fieldwork also records repairs, garden tools, knives, and other everyday goods. Rasmussen notes that rural inaden may remain generalists while urban artisans specialize.

== Makers and social organization ==
In historical accounts, inadan families supplied noble patrons with jewelry, weapons, tools, wooden utensils, leather goods, and riding equipment. They also acted as intermediaries, messengers, marriage brokers, musicians, and specialists in oral history. Their position was socially ambiguous. Inaden were treated as subordinate to noble families, but their work as mediators, ritual specialists, and verbal artists gave them access to people and information that nobles did not always have.

Accounts from Niger and Mali describe a recurring division of labor. Women make and decorate leather bags of different sizes, pillows, cushions, saddle blankets, and panels for tent interiors. Men carve wood, forge and engrave metal, make or repair tools and weapons, and assemble the rigid structures of camel saddles. A finished object could draw on several skills within one household. In Nur's fieldwork, husbands and wives sometimes worked side by side under one shelter, while other families used separate work areas. Women also assisted with tasks around a forge when required, and men produced tools used in leatherworking.

Craft knowledge is acquired within extended families rather than through a standardized school or guild curriculum. Children grow up among tools, hides, unfinished work, customers, and discussions about materials and prices. They begin by observing, handling objects, and helping relatives, then develop different specializations over time. Nur records the phrase "the hand knows" for this embodied knowledge and notes that artisans stress individual ways of working rather than a single prescribed method.

The domestic location of production affects both labor and learning. Leather may be cut, sewn, or embroidered while other household work and childcare continue nearby. Customers bring materials, collect finished goods, negotiate prices, or request repairs at the same compound. Home workshops are found in both towns and rural settlements, including Niamey, Agadez, Timia, Maradi, Dakoro, and Gadabedji in Niger.

== Materials and techniques ==
Materials differ according to object, region, date, and the resources available to a workshop. Goat and other animal skins are used for tents, bags, boxes, covers, straps, and decorative panels. Rawhide can lash together the wooden frame of a saddle, while finished colored leather covers the structure. Reed, cotton cloth, wool, wood, iron, brass, copper, and silver may be incorporated as structural or decorative elements.

Recent examples in Niger record cutting, dyeing or coloring, smoothing, painting, perforating, marking lines, gluing, sewing, and embroidery. Much of this work is carried out on a low, elongated workbench known in different Tuareg varieties as an elkelib, elkelem, or eshed. Its surface supports the leather during cutting and polishing. To make short fringe, a craftswoman may roll the leather, place it against the end of the bench, and drive a knife through the compressed layers. Millet paste is used as an adhesive in some work.

Documented decorative methods include stitched panels, narrow strips of contrasting leather, embroidery, painted or dyed fields, punched or drawn lines, metal plates, tassels, and long fringe. Geometric arrangements are common, but their scale and execution vary between workshops and object types. A large saddlebag may use broad colored panels and rows of fringe, whereas a small molded box can carry a compact resist-dyed pattern.

One documented molded form is the lidded leather box called a bata. Tinadan women in Niger soaked pieces of skin until pliable and shaped them over a clay form. Threads of wax were laid on the surface before the box was dyed red with a colorant derived from millet stalks. When the wax was removed, the protected areas retained the original leather color, producing a two-tone geometric design. Bata were used for jewelry, coins, cosmetics, pomade, or granulated incense.

A technical analysis examined a miniature tamzak saddle made by Hamidan Oumba in Azel, Niger. The analysis found that its turquoise leather contained substantial copper as well as zinc, lead, and chlorine, and considered a chloride corrosion product from a leaded brass alloy a possible source of the green-blue colorant.

== Objects and uses ==
=== Bags and containers ===
Museum records document personal pouches, small cases, large travel bags, and saddlebags carried on camels. A decorated camel travel bag recorded by Nur was sewn and embroidered for a herder, while a Peabody Museum example from the Algerian Sahara is identified as a woman's traveling bag, or tehaihait, for personal possessions.

Large leather storage bags could be secured with an elaborate metal lock called a tanast. The lock and key were functional metalwork made by inadan men, while the bag was commonly women's work. Keys could also be worn as weights on women's head coverings.

Other containers include the molded bata and specialized bags for tea equipment. Some teapots are carried in a leather bag called a tekabawt, and tea glasses may be stored in fitted wooden boxes covered with leather.

=== Saddles and riding equipment ===
The camel saddle is a composite object made from wood, rawhide, finished leather, and metal. One prominent form is the tamzak, also catalogued as tarik or térik. A Smithsonian example has a wooden structure lashed with rawhide and covered with colored leather and metal ornaments. A Peabody Museum example from the Algerian Sahara has metal and cheetah skin that its catalogue associates with the owner's high status, while the Fowler Museum records saddle production among the principal activities of inadan artisans.

Leatherworkers also made saddlebags, saddle blankets, cushions, and pillows used in riding or camp life. The saddle itself could involve men who shaped the wooden support and attached metal parts, together with women who prepared and decorated leather coverings. Contemporary workshops make both full-sized saddles for use and reduced versions for the tourist and art markets.

=== Tent and domestic furnishings ===
Leather was part of the architecture and furnishing of mobile households. Accounts of western Tuareg groups describe tents covered with goat skins, while some eastern groups used matting. A bride's family traditionally provided the tent and its household goods; the tent and furnishings were considered the wife's property. Portability allowed the structure and its contents to be packed onto animals when a camp moved.

Tinadan women made fringed decorative leather panels for tent interiors. They also worked leather into long reed-and-leather mats or windscreens, commonly called esaber, which marked the edge of a tent or separated the sleeping area. When lowered, these screens reduced wind, sand, and outside view; they could be rolled up to admit air. Wooden supports made by male inadan held the screens and provided places from which bags and clothing could be hung.

Cushions, pillows, bags, and covered boxes formed part of the same domestic ensemble. Their decoration added color and pattern to the tent interior, and the objects remained in household use. Like the tent itself, the furnishings belonged to the wife and could be packed when the household moved.

=== Weapons and personal objects ===
Leather was used with weapons made by male inadan. Surviving objects include sheaths for the takoba sword and the telek arm dagger, straps, and the large leather shield called an agher. The Peabody Museum describes the agher as large enough to cover much of the body and pairs it with the long sword as part of older Tuareg warrior equipment.

Small objects include pouches, amulet cases, pendants combining leather and metal, and cases for valued possessions. The Fowler exhibition also included Qur'anic boards and cases, swords and sheaths, and tea-making equipment alongside leather bags and saddles.

== Design and regional variation ==
Geometric organization recurs in Tuareg leatherwork and is produced through several techniques. Painted panels on saddlebags, stitched arrangements of colored strips, wax-resist patterns on bata, and the alternating leather and reed of tent screens create different surfaces. Fringe and tassels edge bags and saddle coverings; metal fittings ornament and reinforce joins.

Collections include nineteenth-century painted leather from Tassili n'Ajjer in Algeria, early twentieth-century work from Agadez in Niger, and bags attributed to tinadan artists in the Timbuktu region of Mali. Terminology, preferred forms, and construction vary across these areas. The Hausa-made Agadez saddlebag also records a case in which the makers and intended users belonged to different communities.

Variation also exists within a single locality or family. Access to leather, pigments, imported cloth, and metal affects the finished object. Artisans differ in speed, precision, preferred patterns, and choice of tools. Nur describes craftsmanship as learned and adaptable practice, with no single design formula shared identically by all Tuareg communities.

== Historical change and markets ==
Under older patronage arrangements, inadan families made and repaired goods for noble households and received support, payment, or protection in return. These relations did not disappear at one date, but their economic basis weakened during the twentieth century. Drought, conflict, and other hardships contributed to settlement in towns, while former noble patrons lost some of their ability to commission labor-intensive objects. Curnow identifies the 1950s through the 1970s as a transitional period in which some objects ceased to be made for household use and others acquired new customers.

Artisans increasingly sold directly in Agadez, Niamey, and overseas. Davis's study of Niger describes a change from Western collecting focused on supposedly untouched "traditional" objects toward collaborative production of Western-format goods in recognizable Tuareg styles. Older and newer forms coexisted. Workshops continued to repair tools and make bags, saddles, pillows, jewelry, and weapons while adjusting dimensions, materials, and decoration for different buyers.

The Oumba and Ouhoulou family workshops of Agadez and Niamey were used in the traveling exhibition Art of Being Tuareg to document three decades of production for Tuareg, other African, European, and Asian customers. The exhibition also noted that Hermès catalogues had featured commissioned Tuareg leatherwork and related designs since 1993. Its workshop display placed local commissions alongside work made for international commercial and museum networks.

Workshops also made miniatures for art and tourist markets. The tamzak studied by Burr was bought from its maker in Niger in 1997 and reproduced the structure of a full-sized camel saddle at a smaller scale. X-radiography showed a composite frame, and the analysis suggested that a clay-based substrate had been made for the miniature rather than reused from scrap.

Tourism-related sales declined after 2007 as insecurity and terrorism reduced travel to Saharan Niger. Nur records inadan who sought regular wages as teachers, doctors, soldiers, or drivers, and others who traveled to gold-mining areas. Families that continued to make or repair goods still used craft as a source of income.

== Museum collections and research ==
Nineteenth- and twentieth-century Tuareg leather objects are held by the Musée du Quai Branly – Jacques Chirac, the Peabody Museum of Archaeology and Ethnology at Harvard University, the British Museum, the Fowler Museum at UCLA, and the Smithsonian's National Museum of African Art. Collection records often name no individual maker and instead use broad cultural attributions.

Art of Being Tuareg: Sahara Nomads in a Modern World brought together 235 objects, about thirty percent of them from the Fowler Museum. It opened at the Fowler in 2006, traveled to Stanford University's Cantor Arts Center in 2007, and was shown at the National Museum of African Art in 2008. Leather purses, bags, saddles, tent furnishings, sheaths, and other objects were presented alongside jewelry, clothing, tools, music, and contemporary workshop documentation.

Technical descriptions are less common than studies of artisans' social position. Nur identifies Catherine Hincker's 2005 monograph as an exception because it treats iron, metal, leather, and wood techniques together in Tuareg communities of Mali and Burkina Faso.

The exhibition catalogue, edited by Thomas K. Seligman and Kristyne Loughran, includes Edmond Bernus's chapter "The Tuareg Artisan: From Technician to Mediator". Later research has added household ethnography and material analysis. Nur's work examines learning and family production in Niger, while Burr's study used X-radiography and X-ray fluorescence to investigate a miniature saddle without sampling it.

== See also ==
- African art
- Inadan (African caste)
- Leather crafting
- Saddle
- Tuareg people
