= Inadan (African caste) =

Historic African Artisan Caste

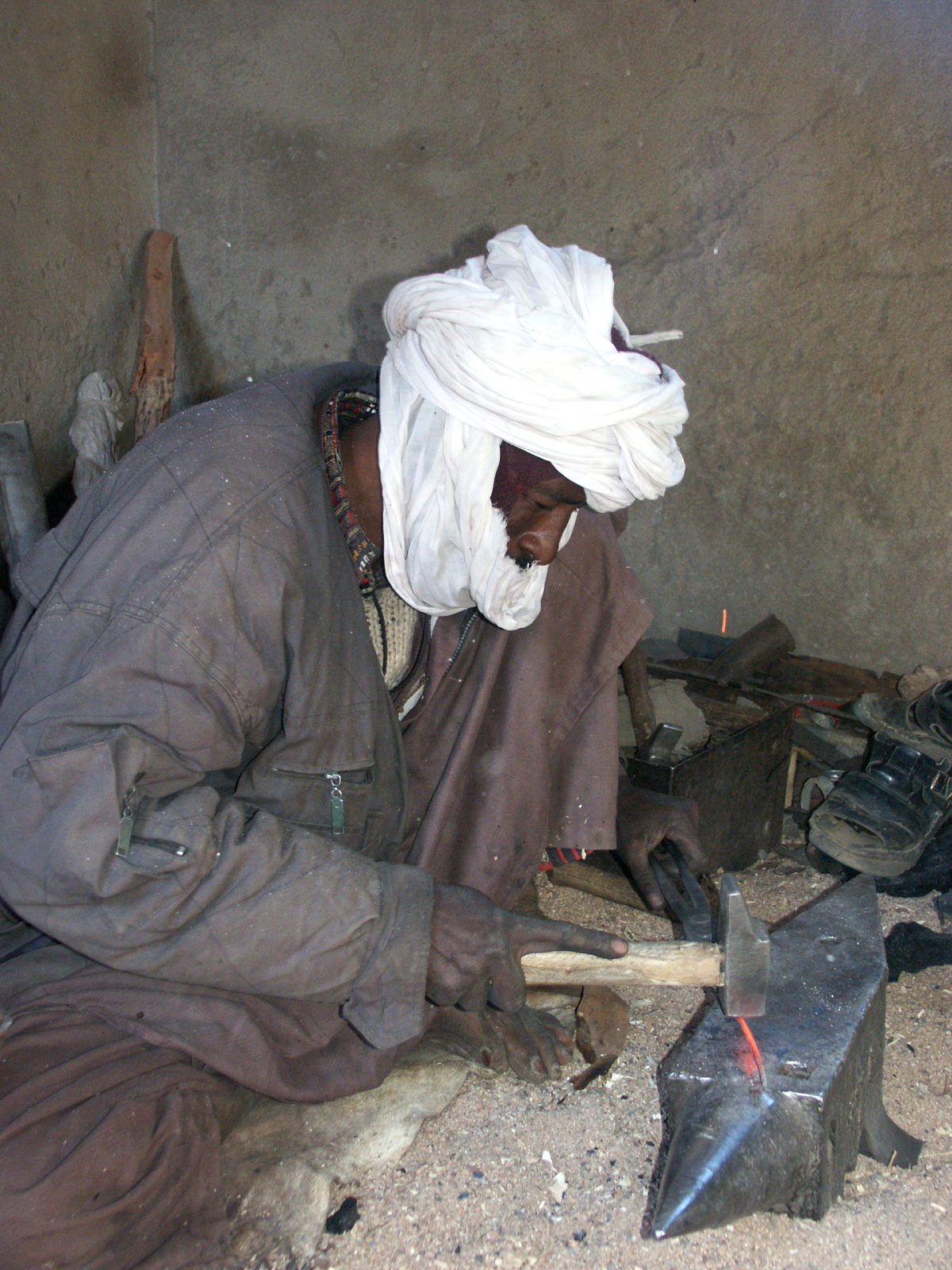
A Inadan hereditary occupation has included blacksmith work in Tuareg society.

The Inadan, also referred to as Enad or Tinadan, have been one of the historic artisan castes in West Africa, particularly among the Tuareg people. Sometimes referred to as an endogamous caste and sometimes as endogamous marginalized class within the Tuareg, the Inadan are found in Niger, Mali, Libya, Sahel and other parts of sub-Saharan Africa.

The Inadan have been a part of the Tuareg society that has traditionally featured clan membership, social status and caste hierarchies within each political confederation. These hierarchical systems have included nobles, clerics, craftsmen and unfree strata of people. According to the anthropologist Jeffrey Heath, Tuareg artisans have been a separate endogamous castes known as the Inhædˤæn (Inadan) within this social stratification.

The Inadan live in Tuareg settlements, are sedentary, considered subordinate and lowly, and endogamous because of social taboos towards inter-marriage between their strata and other members of the Tuareg tribe. Their hereditary occupation has been artisanal smith-related work and leather work, but they have diversified into providing labor services such as in tourism in contemporary Tuareg communities. According to Heath, Inadan have included the blacksmith, jewelers, wood workers and leather artisan castes. They produced and repaired the saddles, tools, household items and other items for the Tuareg community. In Niger and Mali, where the largest Tuareg populations are found, the artisan castes were attached as clients to a family of nobles or vassals, and carried messages over distances for their patron family. They also are the ones who traditionally sacrifice animals during Islamic festivals.

== See also ==
- Caste systems in Africa
- Tuareg leatherwork
