= Takoba =

Type of sword used across the western Sahel

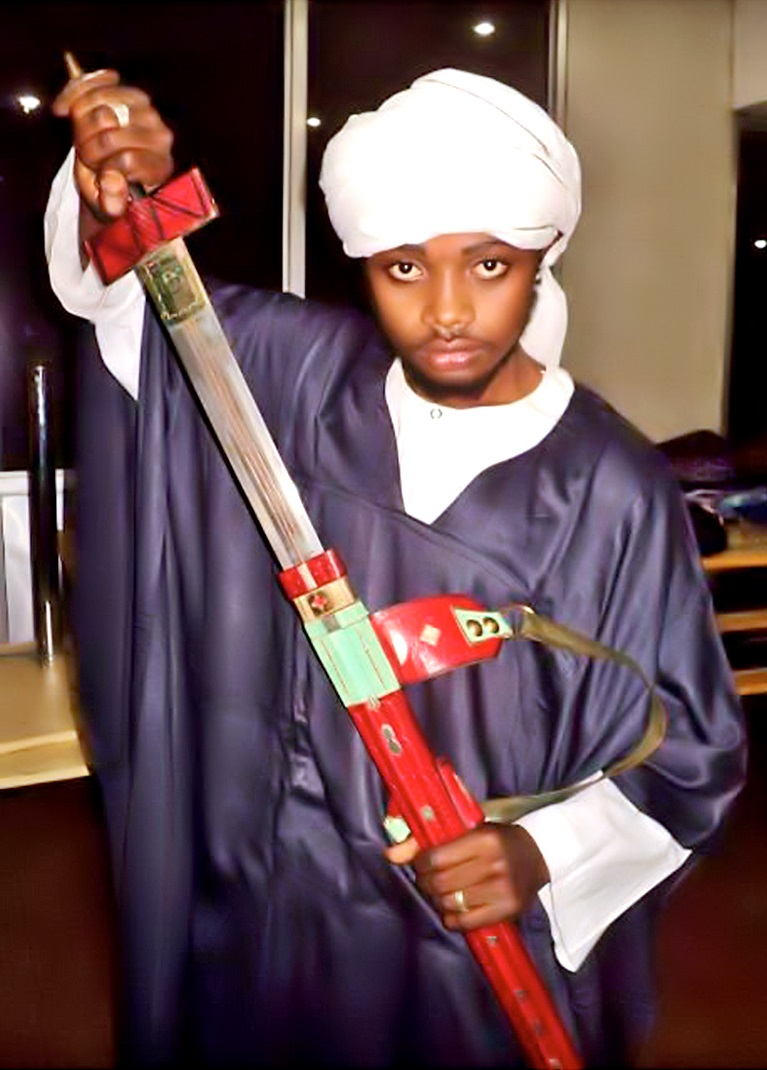
A Malian man drawing a highly decorated takouba - the leather covered crossguard is evident, as is the fullering of the blade and tooling of the leather scabbard.

Takoba (also takuba or takouba) is a sword that is used across the western Sahel and among ethnic groups such as the Tuareg, the Hausa, and the Fulani. It usually measures about one meter in length. Takoba blades are straight and double edged with a pronounced tapering from the guard towards the tip; they can exhibit several notable features, including three or more hand-ground fuller grooves and a rounded point.

Since the Tuareg have an aversion to touching iron, the takoba's hilt, like many iron implements, is fully covered. Typically the simple but deep crossguard is of iron sheet, or iron-framed wood, covered in tooled leather, and occasionally sheathed in brass or silver; the grip is also often leather-covered but the pommel is always of metal, often brass or copper, sometimes iron or silver. Alternatively the whole hilt can be covered in brass or silver sheathing. The scabbard is made of elaborately tooled leather. Geographical variations in the form of the hilt have been noted, but no rigorous typology has been established. Variations in the quality of blade and fittings on takobas probably mostly reflect the wealth of their owners.

There is much debate about whether the takoba was used only by the imúšaɣ or warrior class of the Tuareg, or whether it could be borne by vassals.

As with most crafted items used by the Tuareg, takoba are crafted by the ìnhædʻæn (singular énhædʻ) caste, who are of a different ethnicity from the imúšaɣ and speak Ténet, a secret language. The imúšaɣ believe that the ìnhædʻæn have magical powers, which some theorize to be associated with their traditional roles as metalworkers and to the imúšaɣ aversion to both metalworking and touching iron.

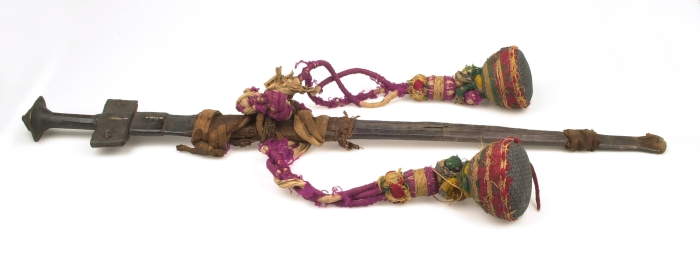
Scabbarded takoba with elaborately tassled baldric

== Bibliography ==
- Christopher Spring (1993) African Arms and Armor, Smithsonian Institution Press, ISBN 978-1-56098-317-0
