= Berber tribes =

Tribes indigenous to North Africa

Berber tribes are tribes of Berber descent inhabiting the Maghreb region. They are traditionally divided into three large tribal confederations: Masmuda, Zenata and Sanhaja. They often form smaller confederations of tribes together (for example the Haha or the Ait Yafelman). Medieval historian Ibn Khaldun and other medieval genealogists also categorised Berber tribes into either the Baranis or Butr to refer to whether they were sedentary or nomadic.

== History ==
=== Mythological genealogy ===
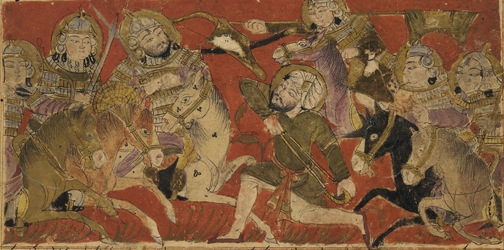
The slaying of Goliath by David with a stone from his sling, Tarikhnama

Ibn Khaldun divides the Baranis into the Awraba, 'Adjisa, Azdadja, Masmuda-Ghomara. Kutama-Zawawa, Sanhaja and Hawwara. Although, the inclusion of the last three is controversial among medieval genealogists because they were considered to be of Himyarite descent (although that is likely a myth). The eponymous ancestor of the Baranis is said to be Burnus. The Butr are divided into the Lawata, the Nafusa, the Nafzawa, the Banu Fatin and the Miknasa. The eponymous ancestor of the Butr is said to be Madghis al-Abtar.

According to Ibn Khaldun, the Butr and the Baranis and thus the Berbers as a whole descend from Mazigh, son of Canaan, son of Ham, son of Noah. Alternatively, some medieval genealogists attribute Jalut (Goliath) as the ancestor of the Berbers and say he migrated from Palestine to North Africa.

=== Masmuda ===
Prior to the Muslim conquest of the Maghreb, the Masmuda largely inhabited the interior of Morocco. Some of the branches and sub-groups of the Masmuda are Ghumaras who inhabited the north of Morocco near the Rif, their neighbours the Barghawata from the Sebou River to Oum Er-Rbia River and to the south the Regraga and Haha. Their descendants today are the Shilha.

In the 12th century, the Masmuda of the mountains and the plains united together in support of the religious preacher Ibn Tumart who himself belonged to the Hargha, a tribe of the Masmuda. This union forged the Almohad Caliphate. Another dynasty of Masmuda origin was the Hafsids of Tunisia.

=== Zenata ===
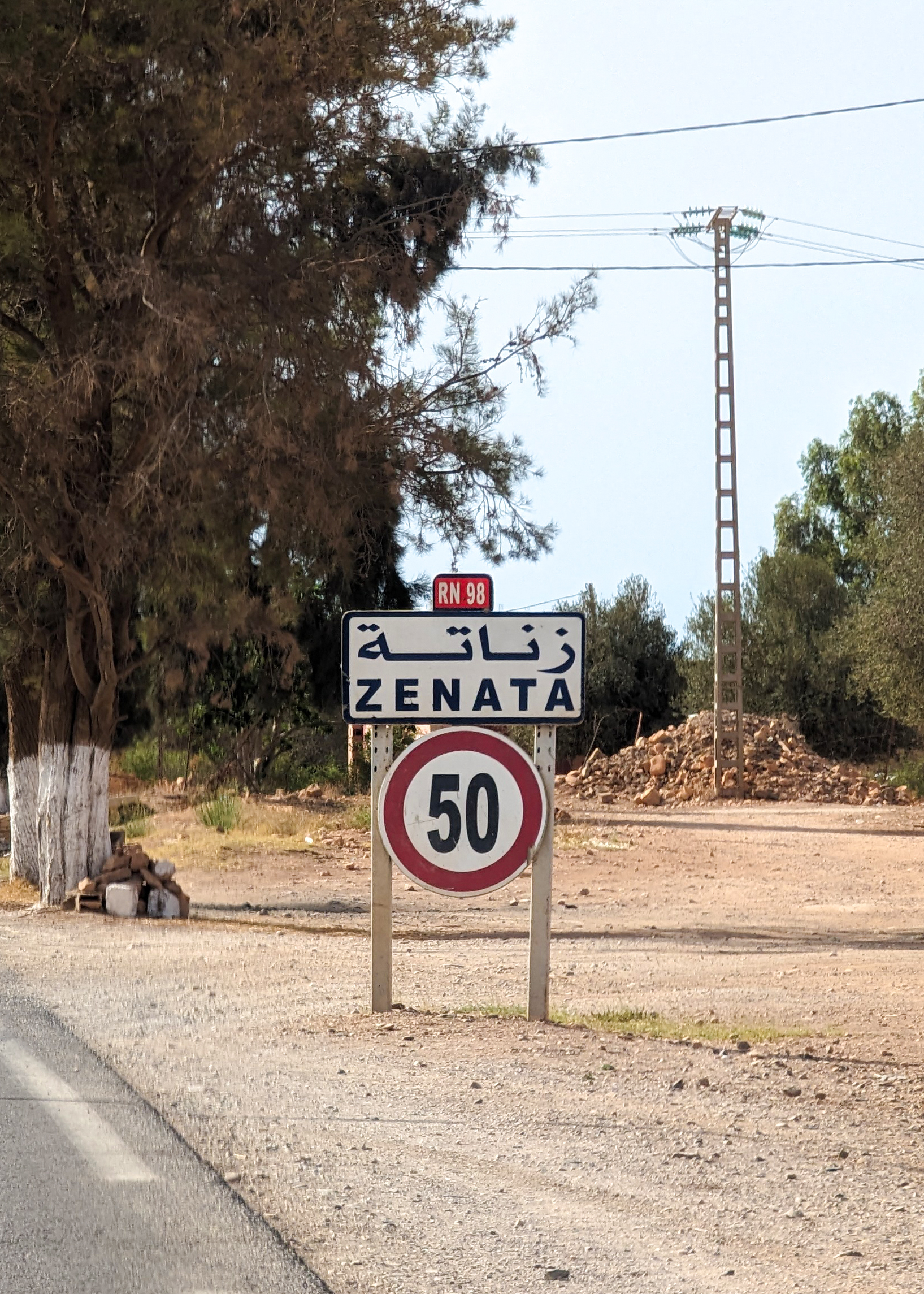
A sign pointing to Zenata, Algeria

In pre-Islamic times, the Zenata migrated from southern Tunisia and Tripolitania (in Libya) through the Saharan fringes to the Algerian highlands. Some of them remained in Tiaret and Tlemcen while others migrated to the Moulouya River in Morocco. There are also some Zenata in the Sous and Marrakesh area. Some of the historical branches of the Zenata are the Maghrawa, Miknassa and Banu Ifran who played a major role in shaping the history of North Africa. Most Riffian tribes are of Zenata origin.

Although the Masmuda formed the core of the Almohad army and hierarchy, Abd al-Mumin, who founded the dynasty, belonged to an Arabized section of the Zenata known as the Kumiya. He claimed an illustrious Arab and Berber ancestry linking him to the Berber Queen Kahina. From the 13th to 16th centuries, with the fall of the Almohads, many dynasties of Zenata origin were able to take power like the Zayyanids in Algeria and the Marinids and Wattasids in Morocco.

=== Sanhaja ===
Almoravid empire at its greatest extent

The Sanhaja are composed of branches like the Hawwara, Lawata, Lamtuna, Massufa and Guddula. As early as the third century, they migrated and began to penetrate the Sahara. They continued to gradually advance into the Sahara, expanding into the Sudanian savanna.

The Massufa and the Lamtuna united with smaller groups in Mauritania belonging to the mulaththamun or veil wearers. Other groups like the Jazula, Lamta and Haskura migrated to the plains of the Sous region in Morocco, with some going further north to the Middle Atlas and Rif. Some went eastwards into Algeria, reaching the region of Constantine. The Kutama became a pillar of the Fatimid Caliphate and their descendants today are the Kabyles.

Many dynasties emerged from the Sanhaja such as the Zirids, Hammadids and the Almoravids.

== Terminology and social organisation ==
Berber tribes are typically prefixed with the word "Ait," which denotes descent from an eponymous ancestor (biological or fictive kinship). Ait (also spelled Ayt, Aith, At) is a Berber term meaning 'children of', parallel to Arabic Banu/Beni or Maghrebi Arabic Oulad. An example is Ait Atta 'Children of Atta', referring to their supposed ancestor, Dadda Atta. It can also signify 'people of' or 'those who'; for example, the Ait Yafelman 'those who have found/seek peace'. The Tuareg equivalent to Ait is Kel which is used similarly by Tuareg tribes.

The amghar (Berber languages: amɣar, lit. 'elder, chief, leader') is a term found in many Berber languages, which is equivalent to the Arabic shaykh. The role of the 'amghar' in tribal contexts varies. Among the Tuaregs, an amghar could refer either to a leader of a tribal confederation or to a leader of a tribal group who acts as an intermediary between the amenukal ('Ruler, King') and his tribe. It can also just refer to an elder or an ascendant. In Morocco, amghar referred to an elected tribal leader who served for a limited period by the notables of the tribe or the jemma.

The amghar presided over the jemma (from Maghrebi Arabic jemʿa 'assembly > Friday prayer), an assembly that enforced customary law (izerf), and each tribe, clan, and further division had its own amghar and jemma. The amghar may only have had an administrative role, but could also possibly deal with defending against or raiding other tribes. Some tribes maintained an additional amghar for wartime use. The amghar would usually rule for one year, except in exceptional cases. This system was interrupted by the imposition of qāʾids ('commanders') by the sultans of Morocco, leading to the rise of the grands caids. Among the Shilha, while the mqəddəm is an elected leader, an amghar is a temporal ruler who owes his authority to force rather than elections.

== List of tribes by ethnicity ==
=== Riffians ===
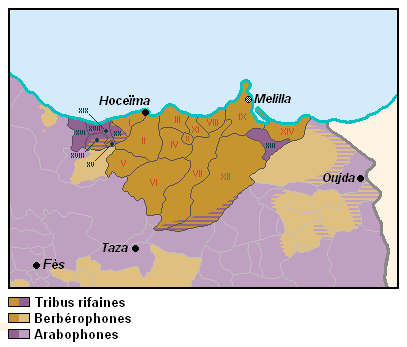
I. Ibaqouyen; II. Ait Waryaghar; III. Ait Temsamane; IV. Ait Touzine; V. Ait Ammart; VI. Igzennayen; VII. Ibdarsen; VIII. Ait Said; IX. Iqer'iyen; X. Ait Tafersit; XI. Ait Oulichek; XII. Ait Bouyahyi; XIII. Ouled Settout (Arabized); XIV. Ikebdanen; XV. Targuist (Senhaja); XVI. M'tioua (Senhaja); XVII. Mestassa; XVIII. Ait Gmil; XIX. Ait Boufrah; XX. Ait Itteft

Riffians are native to the Rif region. The Riffians are divided into these tribes and tribal groups:

- Ait Ammart
- Ait Boufrah
- Ait Bouyahyi
- Ait Gmil
- Ait Itteft
- Ait Ourich
- Ait Said
- Ait Tafersit
- Ait Temsamane
- Ait Touzine
- Ait Waryaghar (alternatively, Aït Ouriaghel) is one of the largest tribal confederations in the Rif. They played an important part in the Rif War and the famous anticolonialist political and military leader of the Republic of the Rif, Abd el-Krim, was a member, specifically the Ait Khattab branch.
- Ibaqouyen
- Ibdarsen
- Igzenayen
- Ikebdanen
- Iqer'iyen
- Mestassa

=== Shilha ===
The Shilha or Chleuh are made up of many tribes and tribal confederations. They are descendants of the Masmuda.

==== Haha ====
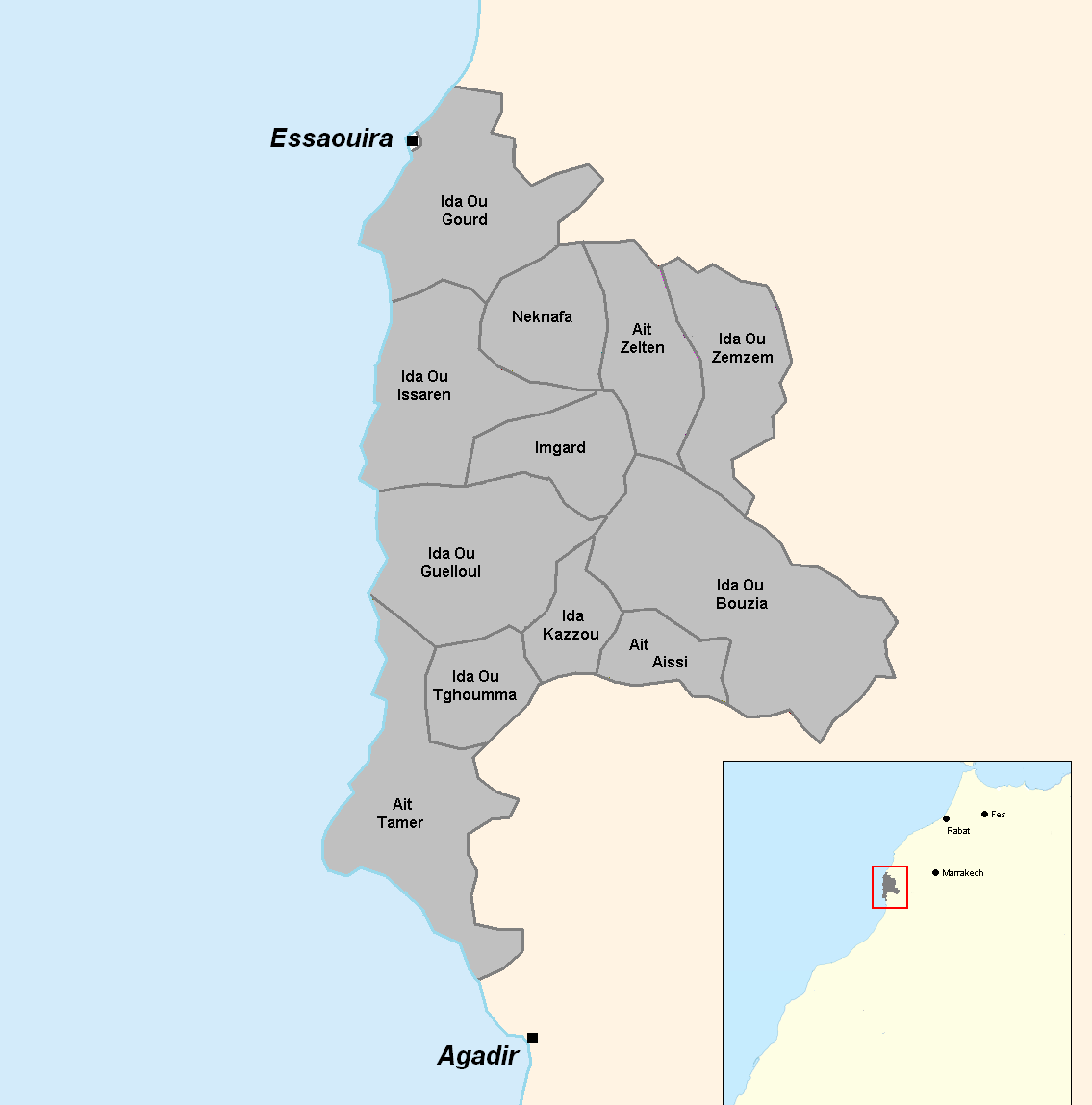
Map of the 12 Haha tribes and their territories

The Haha or Ihahan is a tribal confederation in the region between Essaouira and Agadir. They are made up of the following tribes:

- Ida Ou Gourd
- Ida Ou Issaren
- Ida Ou Guelloul
- Aït Amer
- Ineknafen
- Imgrad
- Ida Ou Kazzou
- Ida Ou Tghemma
- Aït Zelten
- Ida Ou Zemzem
- Ida Ou Bouzia
- Aït ʿIssi

==== Lakhsass and Ait Baamrane ====
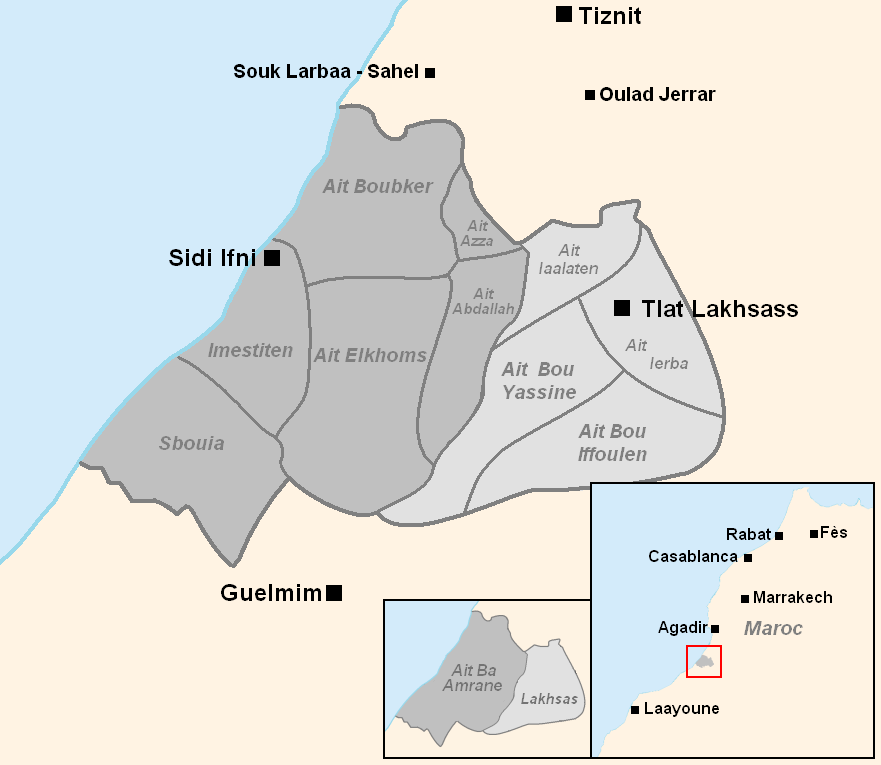
Map showing the composition of Ait Baamrane (dark grey) and Lakhsass (light grey)

The Lakhsass are made up of 4 factions:

- Aït Bou Yassine
- Aït Bou Iffoulen
- Aït Iaaleten
- Aït Ierba

The Ait Baamrane are made up of 7 clans:

- Aït l-Khums
- Isbuya or Sbuya
- Imstiten or Misti
- Aït n-Nuss
- Aït Ikhlif or Ikhlif
- Aït Abdallah
- Aït Y'azza

They claim descent from a common ancestor called Ba Amran whose point of origin was the fabled city of Tamdult w-Aqqa near the Draa River. The clans claim descent from his grandsons Bu Bkir Yahya and Baha u-Yihya.

=== Central Atlas Amazigh ===
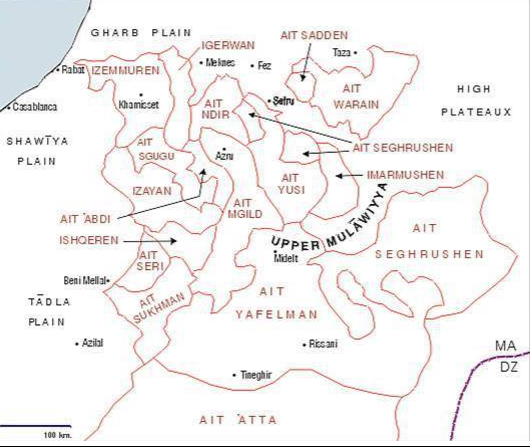
Tribes of the Middle Atlas

The Central Atlas Amazigh, also known as the Beraber and who call themselves Imazighen, are the Berber inhabitants of the Middle Atlas who speak Central Atlas Tamazight.

==== Ait Atta ====
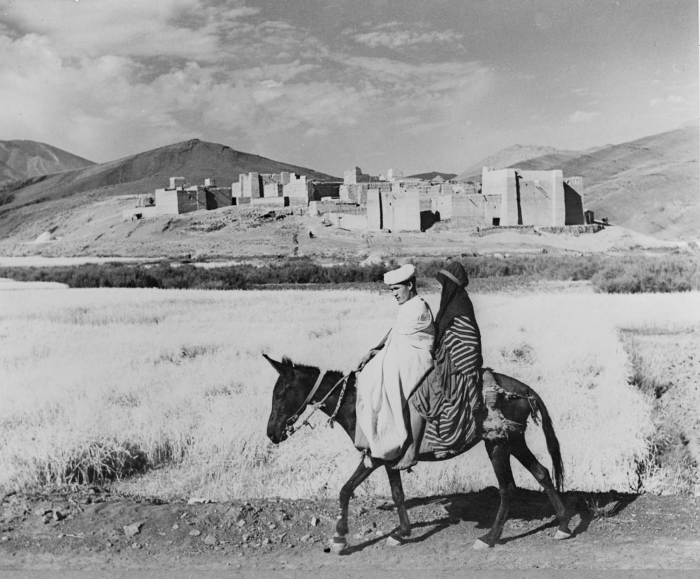
Ait Atta man and woman riding a donkey with a village in the background

The Ait Atta are a large tribal confederation or "supertribe" in the south east of Morocco who inhabit the region of Tafilalt and the Draa River. They claim descent from forty sons of the eponymous ancestor Dadda Atta, and are divided into khams khmas ('five fifths'). These fifths are:

Khoms I:

- Aït Wahhlim
  - Aït Hassu
    - Aït Bu Daud, Aït Ali u Hassu, Aït Attu, Uššn, Uzligen, Aït Izzu
  - Zemru
    - Ignaouen, Ilemšan, Aït Aïssa u Brahim, Aït Bu Iknifen

Khoms II:

- Aït Wallal / Aït Ounir
  - Aït Uzzine, Aït Rebam, Aït Mullah (Masufa), Aït Bu Beker, Aït Unar

Khoms III:

- Aït Isful
  - Aït Ichou, Aït Hammi, Aït Brahim u Hammi, Aït Bab Ighef
- Aït Alwan
  - Aït Ghenima, Aït Unzar, Aït Bu Messaud, Aït Sidi

Khoms IV:

- Aït Urbgui
  - Aït Khabbash, Aït Umnast, Beni Mhamed (Arab tribe under the Ait Atta)

Khoms V:

- Aït Aïssa Mzim
  - Aït Yazza, Aït Khalifa, Aït el Fersi, Aït Kherdi

The fifths were divided into a large number of groups who elected their own leaders called amghar n-tamazirt but there was no leader at the head of a fifth. The supreme chief of the Ait Atta called the amghar n-ufilla (the chief from above) was elected each year usually in spring. This system has been referred to as "annual rotation and complementarity" and it was the political system used by other Berber tribes in the Central High Atlas. Each year candidates would be chosen from a specific fifth and the members of the other four fifths would vote for a candidate from the chosen fifth. This system was also used for the lower levels. The election would take place in a place called Adman which is near their capital Igharm Amazdar. This election took place in the presence of a Sharif belonging to the Ouled Moulay Abdallah ben Hocein (Dadda Atta was said to be a disciple of Moulay Abdallah ben Hocein founder of the zawiya of Tameslouht) who was referred to as the agurram (meaning religious man or poor Sufi). The agurram would hand the elected chief a bowl of milk and when he began to drink he would push the chief's face into it so that it spills all over his beard and clothes. After, the agurram would offer the chief some dates and all those present would be offered some milk and a date.

==== Ait Yafelman ====
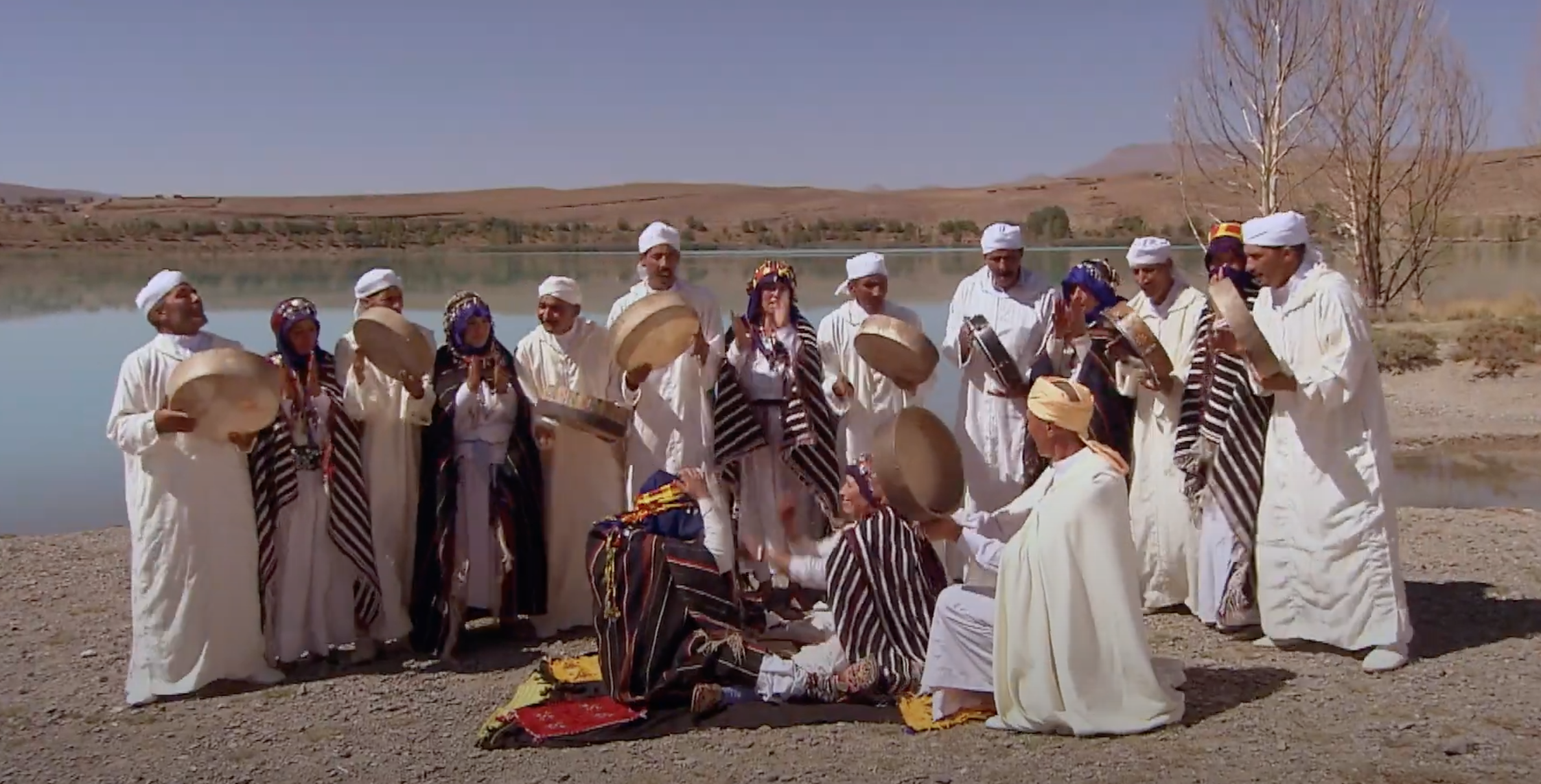
Men and women from the Ait Hdiddou performing Ahidus

The Ait Yafelman (literally "those who found peace") are a tribal confederation that inhabit the High Atlas and are of Sanhaja descent. They are made up of 4 tribes:

- Ait Marghad - The Ait Marghad are said to have historically been part of the Ait Atta. However, they had a falling out with the Ait Atta and proceeded to form the Ait Yafelman with three other tribes. In the 15th century, they had 500-600 families and were made up of three major segments: the Ait Youb, Ait Mesri and the Irbiben. A nomadic segment of about 300 families called the Ait Aissa Izem would later become important among them. In the Moroccan south east, they were one of the last groups to abandon resistance against French colonialism. The fiercest resistance fighters were recruited from the Ait Aissa Izem (for example Zayd ou-Skounti) because of their legendary skills involving ambushes and raids.
- Ait Hdiddou - Hdiddou can mean "small" or "strong" according to oral tradition.
- Ait Yahia
- Ait Izdeg (or Izdey)

They formed together in the 17th century to secure their territory from the expansion of their traditional rivals the Ait Atta. Other tribes joined the confederation like the Ait Ayach and the Sebbah Arabs.

=== Kabyles ===
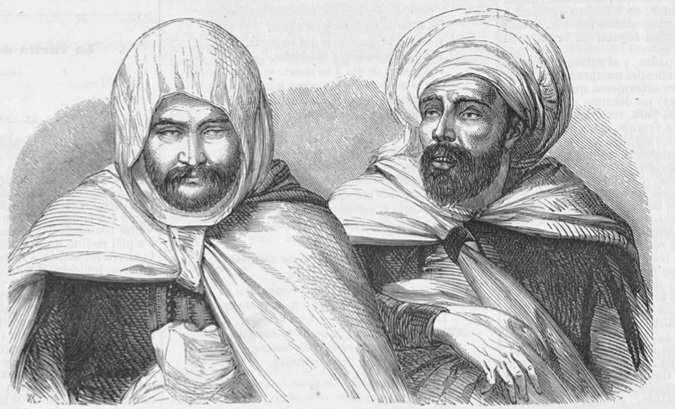
Depiction of Kabyle chiefs from 1853

The Kabyles inhabit the region known as Kabylia. The exonym Kabyle comes from the Arabic qaba'il (قبائل) meaning tribes. The Kabyles stem from the Sanhaja.

==== Greater Kabylia ====
In Greater Kabylia, there are 14 confederations of tribes:

- Iflissen El Bahr
- Aït Ouaguenoun
- Aït Djennad
- Aït Idjeur
- Aït Iraten
- Aït Bethroun
- Aït Menguellet
- Aït Aïssi
- Maatka
- Iflissen Oumlil
- Igouchdal
- Aït Sedka

=== Tuaregs ===
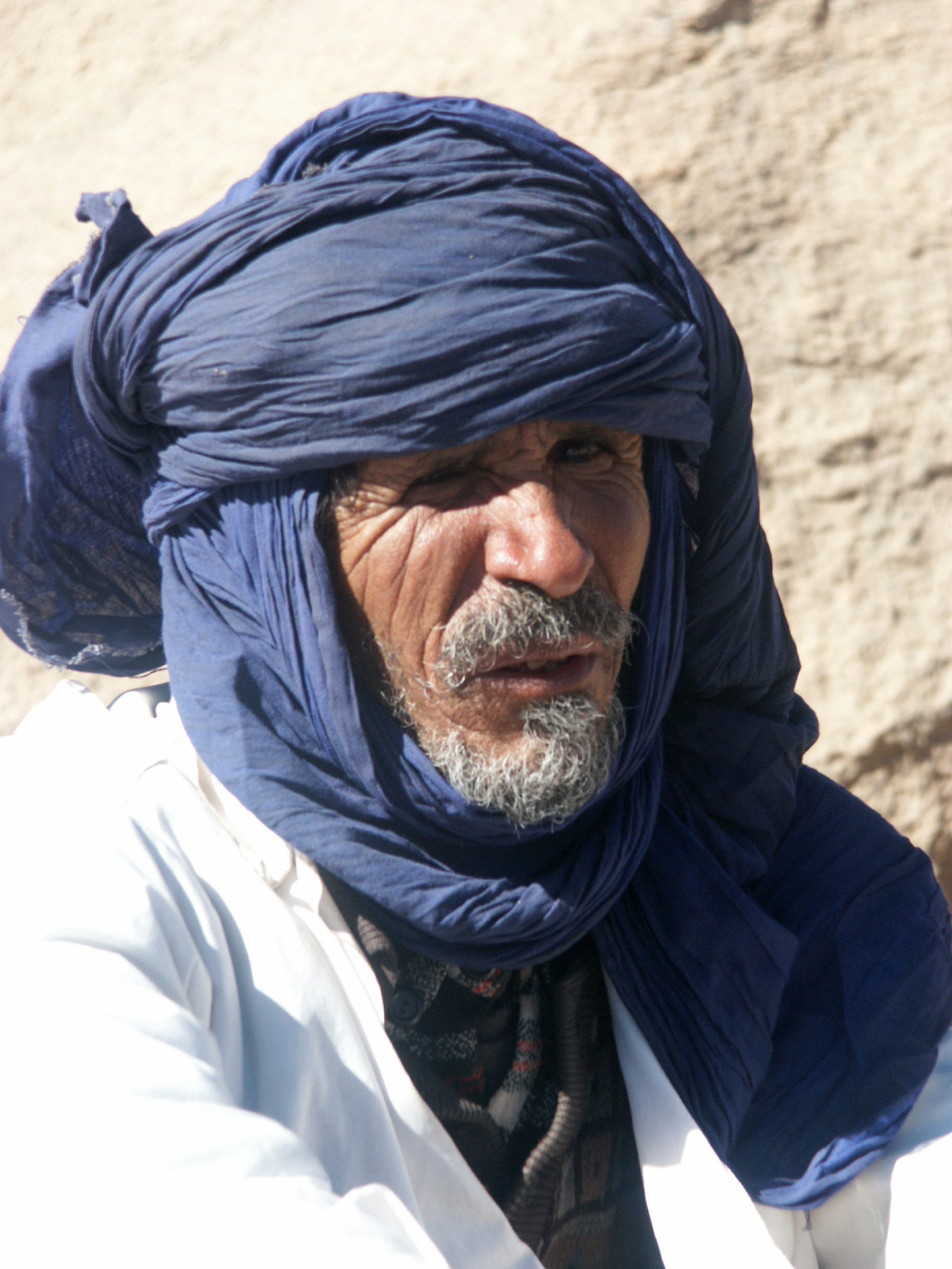
Tuareg from the Hoggar

Historically, the Tuareg have been divided into seven clans who, according to oral tradition, all descend from daughters of the same mother.

Each Tuareg clan (tawshet) is made up of family groups constituting a tribe, each led by its chief, the amghar. A series of tawsheten (plural of tawshet) may bond together under an Amenokal, forming a Kel clan confederation. Tuareg self-identification is related only to their specific Kel, which means "those of" or "people of". For example, Kel Dinnig (those of the east), Kel Ataram (those of the west).

These clans are:

- Kell Ajjer - The Kel Ajjer are found in the mountains of Tassili n'Ajjer with an important centre being the oasis of Ghat and they are to the north east of the Kel Ahaggar who along with them are referred to as the "Northern Tuareg" while the other groups are referred to as the "Southern Tuareg".
- Kel Ayr - The Kel Ayr or Kel Aïr are centered on the Aïr Mountains and the plains to the southwest and west of Aïr
- Iwellemmedan - The Iwellemmedan are made up of the Kel Ataram and the Kel Dinnig.
- Kel Ahaggar - The Kel Ahaggar inhabit the Hoggar Mountains
- Kel Adagh - The Kel Adagh also known as the Kel Adrar are situated in the mountains of Adrar des Ifoghas to the south west of Ahaggar
- Kel Owey
- Kel Gres - The Kel Gres are situated south of the Kel Ayr in the plains around Tessaoua.

=== Chaouis ===
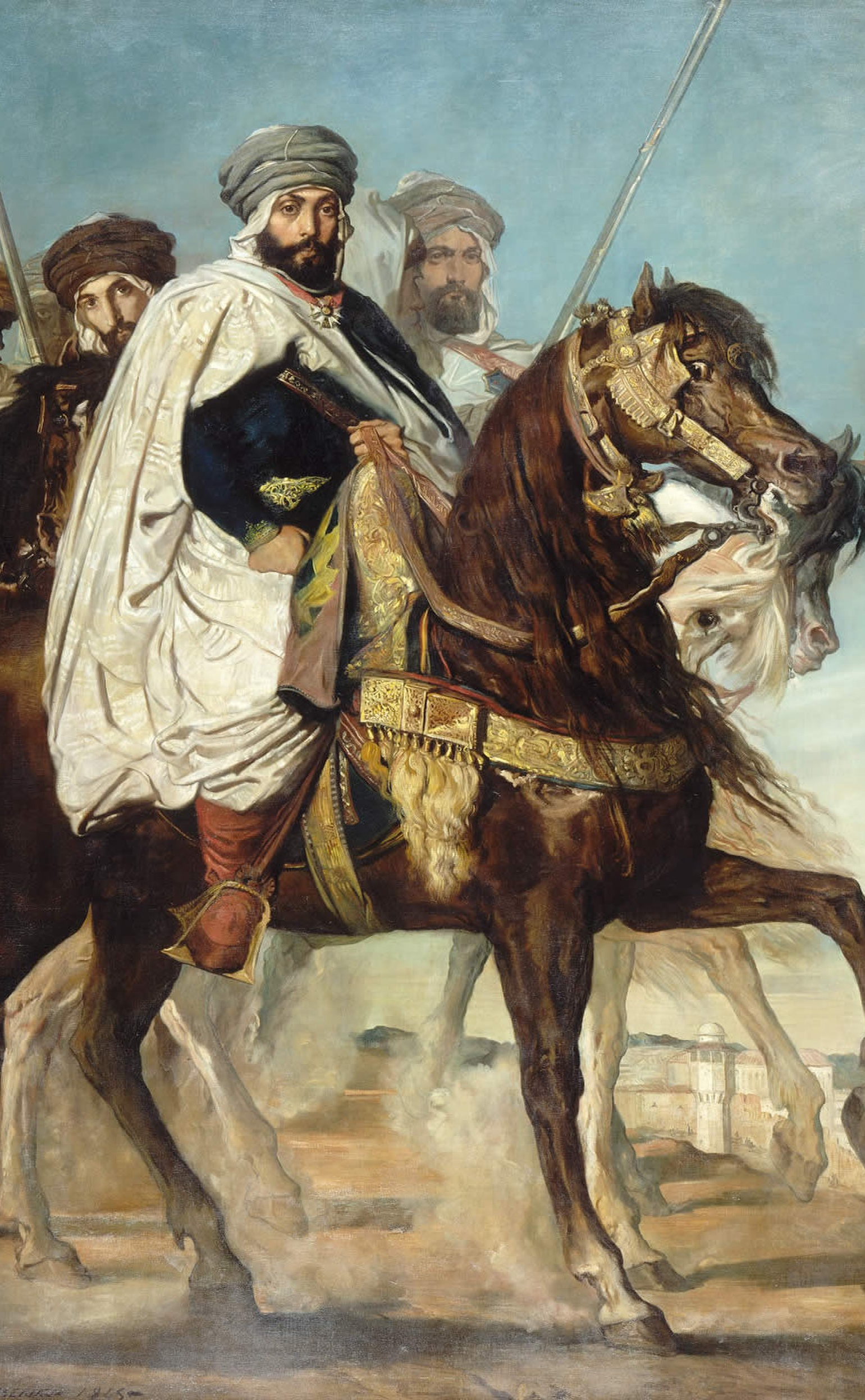
Ali-Ben-Hamet, Caliph of Constantine and Chief of the Haractas by Théodore Chassériau

Chaouis are native to the Aurès region. The most basic social unit of the Chaouis are the harfiqt (clan) and ʿarch (tribe). The harfiqt bear the name of the ancestor.

==== Tribes of the lower Aurès ====
The tribes are:

- Ouled Fatma
- Ouled Sellam
- Haraktas
- Jratna
- Thleth
- Segnia
- Ouled Mhenna
- Ouled Menaâ
- Lahlaymia
- Hiddoussiyene
- Houara
- Ouled Mhemmed
- Ouled Sidi Lhadj

==== Tribes of the middle Aurès ====
The Arabized tribes are:

- Beni Fren
- Bouazid
- Ouled Si Ahmed Benameur
- Ouled Derradj
- Beni Tazaght

The tribes of the plains are:

- Ouled Chlih
- Oules Sidi Yahia
- Ouled Hamla

==== Tribes of the upper Aurès ====
These tribes are sometimes referred to as the Jbayliya and are as follows:

- Touabas
- Aghvassir
- Ait Faffa
- Ait Imessounin
- Nemencha
- Ait Ferh
- Ouled Fadhel
- Ouled Djebel
- Laâchach
- Ouled Sidi Ali
- Amamra
- Beni Mloul
- Beni Bouslimane
- Inoughisséne
- Beni Souik

=== Senhaja Srair ===
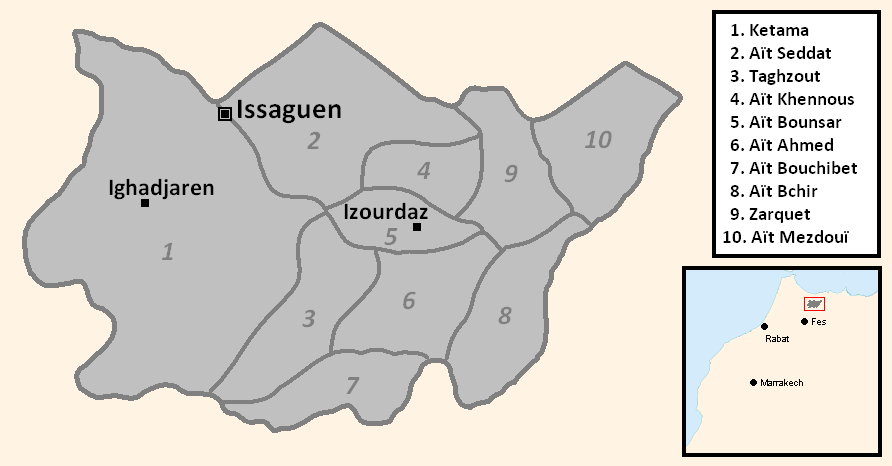
Tribes of Senhaja Srair

The Senhaja Srair are organized into a confederation, comprising eleven tribes of Sanhaja origin in the Central Rif. the 11 tribes are:

- Ketama
- Ait Seddat
- Taghzout
- Ait Kennous
- Ait Bounsar
- Ait Ahmed
- Ait Bouchibet
- Ait Bchir
- Zerqet
- Ait Mezduy
- Targuist

These tribes speak their own Berber language, called Senhaja de Srair language or Tasenhajit.

=== Ghomaras ===
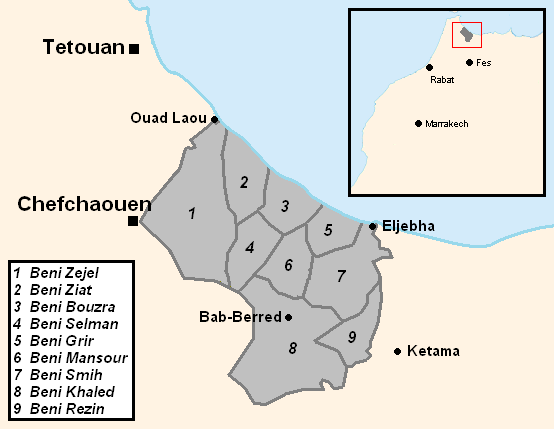
Tribes of the Ghomara

The Ghomara are a group of 9 tribes in the Western Rif. According to Ibn Khaldun, they are of Masmudian descent and their eponymous ancestor is Ghomer son of Masmud. The 9 tribes are:

- Beni Ezjil
- Beni Ziat
- Beni Bouzra (or Bouchera)
- Beni Selmane
- Beni Mansor
- Beni Heal or Beni Grir
- Beni Smih
- Beni Erzine
- Beni Khaled

Most of the tribes are Arabic-speaking but the Beni Bouzra and Beni Mansor still speak Berber. According to tradition, these tribes are said to be the 9 sons of an immigrant schoolteacher called Aghmir who migrated from the Sous or Saguia el-Hamra.

=== Other tribes ===
==== Beni Snassen ====
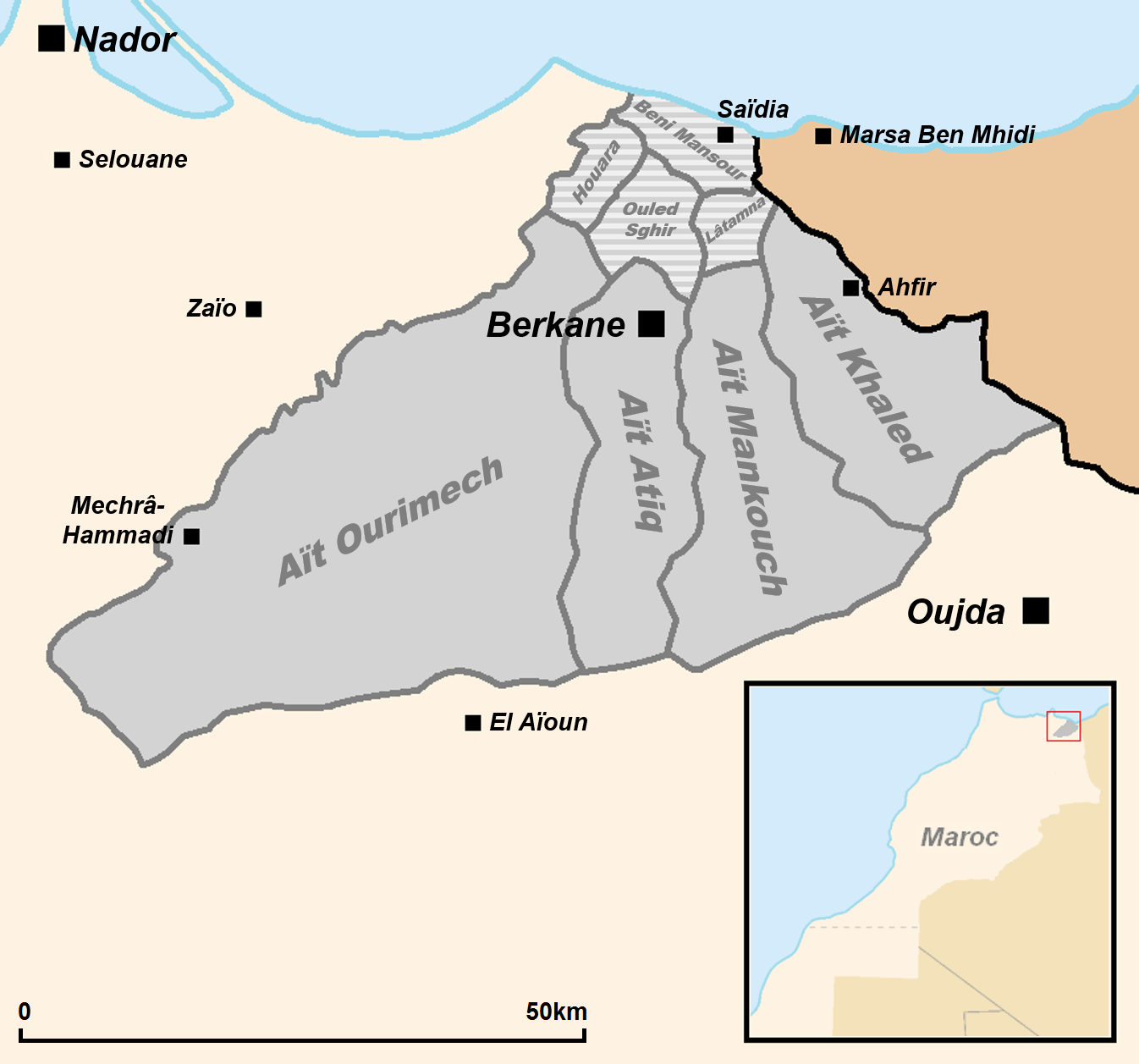
Tribal map of the Beni Iznasen. The Triffa are highlighted north

The Beni Snassen or the Ait Iznassen are a tribal confederation native to the eastern Rif. This confederation is of Zenata origin but it also contains Arab elements. They are made up of 4 factions:

- Beni Khaled
- Beni Mengouch
- Beni Atiq
- Beni Ourimech

The Arab Triffa may also be included in the confederation and they are composed of the Ouled Sghir, Laatamna, Hawara, and Ouled Mansour.

== Sources ==
- Ilahiane, Hsain (2006). Historical Dictionary of the Berbers (Imazighen). United Kingdom: Scarecrow Press. ISBN 9780810864900.
- Prasse, Karl G. (1995). The Tuaregs: The Blue People. Museum Tusculanum Press. ISBN 978-87-7289-313-6.
- Hart, David (1984). The Ait 'Atta of Southern Morocco Daily Life & Recent History. United Kingdom: Middle East & North African Studies Press. ISBN 9780906599150.
