= List of confederations =

Overview of historical confederations

A confederation (also known as a confederacy or league) is a political union of sovereign states united for purposes of common action.

== Confederations of states ==
Includes confederations of confederations:

Name	Period	Type	Notes
Arzawa	1700–1300 BC	Confederation of states	
Philistia	1450–604 BC	Confederation of states	A confederation of city states in the Gaza Strip.
Assuwa	1400-14th century BC	Confederation of states	Confederation of 22 states in Anatolia formed to fight the Hittite Empire.
Xu (state)	? - 512 BC	Confederation of states	
Sea Peoples	1200 BC		Hypothesised seafaring confederation that initiated the Late Bronze Age collapse in the Eastern Mediterranean and the Near East.
Latin League	8th cent. BC - 338 BC	A confederation of Latin towns in central western Italy.	
Three Crowned Kings	600 BC–300 AD	Confederation of states	Three Tamil dynasties which ruled in a triumvirate in Tamilakam, South Asia.
Etruscan dodecapolis	6th Cent. BC	Confederation of cities	one of many Etruscan Leagues that was a confederation of twelve towns
Jin (Korean state)	4th–2nd cent. BC	Confederation of states	
Ba (state)	? - 326 BC	Confederation of chiefdoms	
Mahan confederacy	194 BC–?th cent. AD	Confederation of states	
Gaya Confederacy	42–532 AD	Confederation of states	A Korean confederacy of territorial polities in the Nakdong River basin of southern Korea, growing out of the Byeonhan confederacy of the Samhan period.
Xianbei confederacy	93–234 AD	Confederation of tribal confederations	Nomadic empire in Eastern Asia.
Quda'a	4th cent.-12th cent. AD	Confederations or tribes and tribal confederations	Confederation of Arab tribes.
Toltec Empire	496–1122 AD	Confederation of states	Existed as a confederation between the Toltecs and the Chichimeca, simultaneously as an empire exerting control over places like Cholula.
First Turkic Khaganate	552–603 AD	Confederation of tribal confederations	Göktürk confederation in Eurasia (unsure if actually a confederation)
Oqun/Western Turkic Khaganate	603-657/742 AD	Confederribal confederations	Split from the First Turkic Khaganate. Bore the Nushibi confederation.
Papal States	756–1870	Confederation of states	
Muisca Confederation	c. 800-1540 AD	Confederation of chiefdoms	A confederation of Muisca chiefdoms in South America.
Five Boroughs of the Danelaw	870s - 918	Confederation of towns	A confederation of towns in Danish Mercia
Kimek–Kipchak confederation	880-1035 AD	Confederation of tribal confederations	Turkic state formed by seven peoples, including the Yemek and Kipchaks, in the area between the Ob and Irtysh rivers.
League of Mayapan	987–1461 AD	Confederation of states	Pre-Hispanic state in Yucatan.
Cuman-Kipchak Confederation	10th cent.–1241 AD	Confederation of tribal confederations	Confederation dominated by two Turkic nomadic tribes: the Cumans (also known as the Polovtsians or Folban) and the Kipchaks in the western part of the Eurasian Steppe.
Cinque Ports	11th cent.–present	Confederation of towns	A confederation of coastal towns in Kent and Sussex, England that formerly existed for military and trade purposes but continues for ceremonial reasons.
Aymara kingdoms	1151–1477	Confederation of states	Alliance of native polities in South America, later conquered by the Inca Empire.
Veronese League	1164–1167	Defensive league	was merged into the Lombard League
Lombard League	1167–1250	Defensive league	
Tuscan League	1197–?	Defensive league	
Kingdom of Cusco	1200–1438	Confederation of chiefdoms	
Livonian Confederation	1207–1561	Confederation of states	
First Rhenish League	1254–1257	League of cities	
Old Swiss Confederacy	1291 – 1798	Confederation of states	
Hanseatic League	13th Century - 1669	Trade Confederation	
Jolof Empire	13th century–1549	Confederation of states	Confederacy of Wolof and Serer kingdoms in modern-day Senegambia.
Thuringian Three-City League	1304–1481	League of Cities	
Confederation of Madya-as	13th cent.–1569	Confederal monarchy	A pre-Hispanic state that was located in the Philippines.
Chalco (altépetl)	13th cent.–1521	Confederation of states	
Halberstadt Three-City League	1326–1486	League of cities	
Swabian League of Cities	1331–1389	League of cities	
Confederacy of Tlaxcala	1348–1520	Confederation of states	
Lusatian League	1346–1815	League	
Décapole	1354–1679	Defensive league	
League of God's House	1367–1799	Confederation of states	
Confederation of Cologne	1367–1385	Military confederation	
Aq Qoyunlu	1378–1503	Confederation of states	
Grey League	1395–1799	League	
Lizard League (medieval)	1397–1411	League	
Oirat Confederation	1399–1634	Confederation of tribal federations	Confederation of four Oirat tribes
League of the Ten Jurisdictions	1436 – 1799	League	
Prussian Confederation	1440–1466	Confederation of states	
Nogai Horde	1440s–1634	Confederations of tribal federations	Confederation formed by the Nogais in the Pontic-Caspian Steppe
League of Lezhë	1444–1468	League	Albanian League of nobles revolting against the Ottoman Empire
Anlo (Anlo-Ewe)	1468–present	Confederation of states	
Aztec Empire	1428–1521	Confederation of states	Alliance between three city states in Central America
Menceyatos Confederation	pre-15th cent.	Confederation of states	Confederation on Tenerife prior to Spanish conquest of the Canary Islands. Taoro was primus inter pares.
Three Leagues	1471-1799	League	
Swabian League	1488 - 1534	League	
Kwararafa Confederacy	1500-1840	Confederation of states	Multi-ethnic confederation in central Nigeria.
League of Cambrai	1508–1511	Military league	a military coalition league against the Republic of Venice
League of Cognac	1526 - 1530	Military league	
Confederation of Shan States	1527–1550s	Confederation of states	Confederation in Myanmar that conquered the Ava Kingdom.
Schmalkaldic League	1531–1550s	League	A league of Germanic Lutheran princes that sought to create a protestant replacement for the Holy Roman Empire
United Provinces of the Midi	1573–1589	Confederation of communities	confederation of local communities in Southern France during the French wars of religion
Catholic League (French)	1576–1595	Military league	
Dutch Republic	1579–1795	Confederal republic	
Chaubisi Rajya	16th cent.–1810	Confederation of states	A confederation of 24 states. One of these, Gorkha, later conquered the others to form the Kingdom of Nepal.
Baise Rajya	?–1810	Confederation of states	A confederation of 22 states, later conquered by Gorkha in the unification of Nepal.
Seven Kingdoms of Kongo dia Nlaza	16th cent.	Confederation of states	Confederation of seven kingdoms that were conquered by the Kingdom of Kongo
Kingdom of Lunda	1600-1887	Confederation of states	Confederation of states in the Upemba Depression in modern-day Democratic Republic of the Congo.
Protestant Union	1608–1621	Military league	
Catholic League (German)	1609–1635	Military league	
Confederate States of Lanao	1616–1904	Confederation of states	Confederation on Mindanao, Philippines.
Bohemian Confederation	1619–1620	Confederation of estates	
Heilbronn League	1633–1635	League	
Confederate Ireland	1642–1652	Confederal monarchy	
New England Confederation	1643–1684	Confederation of states	British colonies of Massachusetts, Plymouth, Connecticut, and New Haven.
Maratha Confederacy	1671-1818	Confederation of states	
League of Augsburg	1686 - ?	Military league	
Aro Confederacy	1690–1902	Confederation of states	One of the two largest precolonial and colonial empires of the Igbo (Ibo) people of West Africa. (The other is the Kingdom of Nri.)
Dzików Confederation	1734–1736	Military confederation	
Sikh Confederacy	1748–1799	Confederation of states	Confederation of 12 Sikh states.
Heshun Confederation	1776–1839	Confederation of states	Confederation of Kongsi republics in Borneo.
United States of America	1781–1789	Confederation of states	In its first steps, the United States was a confederation of thirteen states (Delaware, Pennsylvania, New Jersey, Georgia, Connecticut, Massachusetts Bay, Maryland, South Carolina, New Hampshire, Virginia, New York, North Carolina, and Rhode Island and Providence Plantations) organized under the Articles of Confederation. Superseded by the new government under the U.S. Constitution.
United Belgian States	1790	Confederation of states	
Ekiti Confederacy	1800s–1893/1914	Confederation of states	Formed by the Ekiti people, a subset of Yoruba, in Nigeria.
Sokoto Caliphate	1804 – 1903	Confederation of emirates	
Confederation of the Rhine	1806–1813	Confederation of states	Client state of the First French Empire. Dissolved after the Battle of Leipzig in the War of the Sixth Coalition.
United Provinces of New Granada	1811–1816	Confederation of states	Secessionist state in South America later reconquered by Spain
American Confederation of Venezuela	1811 - 1819	Confederal republic	
Sweden-Norway	1814–1905	Union of kingdoms	Personal union between Sweden and Norway. Dissolved after the 1905 Norwegian plebiscite.
German Confederation	1815–1866	Confederation of states	Created as loose confederation of German states by the Congress of Vienna to replace the Holy Roman Empire. Weakened by the Austro-Prussian rivalry and the German Revolutions of 1848 before its final dissolution after Prussia's victory in the Austro-Prussian War.
League of the Free Peoples	1815–1820	Confederation of states	
Confederation of the Equator	1824		
Argentine Confederation	1831–1861	Confederation of states	First political organization of Argentina. Highly decentralized and without a head of state.
Peru-Bolivian Confederation	1836–1839	Confederation of states	
Sonderbund	1845–1847 AD	Confederation of states	A rival confederation of cantons in Switzerland during the Sonderbund War
Granadine Confederation	1858–1863	Confederation of states	
Confederate States of America	1861–1865	Confederation of states	Confederation established by several southern slave states that seceded from the Union. It comprised 11 states: South Carolina, Mississippi, Florida, Alabama, Georgia, Louisiana, Texas, Arkansas, North Carolina, Virginia, and Tennessee. Kentucky and Missouri were both claimed by the Confederacy but never officially seceded. The Confederation was never officially recognized as a nation, although the United Kingdom and France recognized it as a belligerent power. Was reabsorbed by the United States after the American Civil War.
North German Confederation	1867–1871	Confederation of states	Military alliance of 22 states of Germany with the Kingdom of Prussia formed by the Augustbündnis. Superseded by the German Empire after the Franco-Prussian War in 1871.
Fante Confederacy	1867–1873	Confederation of states	Formed by the Fante people, a subset of Akan, in Ghana.
Austria-Hungary	1867–1918	Union of kingdoms	Personal union between the Kingdoms and Lands Represented in the Imperial Council (Austria) and the Lands of the Crown of Saint Stephen (Hungary). Dissolved by the Treaties of Trianon and Saint-Germain-en-Laye after World War I.
Carlist States	1872–1876	Confederation of states	Established by the Carlists in Basque provinces and Navarre during the war.
Confederated Republic of Altai	1918–1922	Confederal republic	Attempt at creating an independent Altai, but was annexed by the Soviet Union.
Republic of the Rif	1921–1926	Confederal republic	
Soviet Union	1922–1936	Confederation of States	Originally it was a confederation between four soviet socialist republics (Russian Soviet Federative Socialist Republic, Ukrainian Soviet Socialist Republic, Byelorussian Soviet Socialist Republic and Transcaucasian Socialist Federative Soviet Republic). As a confederation of member states, Soviet constitutions formally defined each member republic as a sovereign state, whose membership was voluntary, and who could secede at any time. Soviet constitutions of 1936 onward defined the state as a federation. Dissolved in 1991.
Northwest Chinese Soviet Federation	1935–1936	Confederation of states	included the Revolutionary Government of the Republic of Geledesha and the Tibetan People's Republic.
Western Galla Confederation	1936	Confederation of chiefdoms	
Netherlands-Indonesia Union	1949–1956	Union of states	
Arab Federation	1958	Union of states	Ephemeral union of Jordan and Iraq. Dissolved after the overthrow of King Faisal II of Iraq in the July 14 Revolution.
United Arab Republic	1958–1961	Union of states	Union between Syria and Egypt. Dissolved after Syria's withdrawal following the 1961 Syrian coup d'état.
United Arab States	1958–1961	Union of states	Confederation between the United Arab Republic and North Yemen. Dissolved due to the breakup of the United Arab Republic.
Union of African States	1958–1961	Union of states	An attempt to merge Ghana, Guinea and Mali through the views of panafricanism. Dissolved due to rising tensions between the countries after the 1963 Togolese coup d'état.
Federation of Arab Republics	1972–1977	Union of states	An attempt to merge Libya, Egypt and Syria. Dissolved despite public approval in each of the countries due to disagreements among the governments on the terms of the merger.
Arab Islamic Republic	1974	Union of states	Short-lived proposed union of Libya and Tunisia.
Senegambia Confederation	1982–1989	Union of states	Confederation that included the present-day countries of Senegal and Gambia.
Confederation of Mountain Peoples of the Caucasus	1989–2000	Confederal militarized quasi-state	A militarized political organization in the Caucasus
Serbia and Montenegro	2003–2006	Union of states	Replaced the former Federal Republic of Yugoslavia. Dissolved after the 2006 Montenegrin independence referendum.
Novorossiya	2014–2015	Confederation of states	A proposed and de facto confederation that emerged during the War in Donbas.

== Greek city state leagues ==
The Ancient Greeks formed many Leagues which often acted as confederations and alliances usually to combat a common enemy, These polities would often be known as symmachia and koinon.

Name	Period	Notes
Amphictyonic league		
Ionian League	650 - 133 BC	
Peloponnesian League	550 - 366 BC	
Acarnanian League	5th cent. - 31 BC	
Thessalian League		
Delian League	478-404 BC	Confederation of Greek city-states formed to fight the Achaemenid Empire.
Chalcidian League	430 - 348 BC	
Italiote league	430 - 278 BC	A confederation of Greek Colonies in Southern Italy
Epirote League		
Aetolian League	4th cent. –188 BC	
Euboean League	3rd cent. BC - 2nd cent. AD	
Second Athenian League	378 - 355 BC	A revival of the former Delian League
League of Corinth	338/337 – 322 BC	
Arcadian League	370 - 2nd cent. BC	
League of the Islanders	314 - 167 BC	
Achaean League	280–146 BC	
League of the Macedonians		
Chrysaorian League		
League of Free Laconians	21 BC - 297 AD	

== Tribal confederations ==
Name	Period	Notes
Thinite Confederacy	?-3150 BC	A speculated tribal confederation based in Thinis that constituted the Upper Egypt Kingdom.
Medjay	pre 23rd cent.-11th cent. BC	Confederation of nomadic peoples in Ancient Egypt
Israelites	1200-10th cent. BC	Tribal grouping that would form the kingdoms of Judah and Israel.
Thamud	8th cent. BC - 5th cent. AD	Arab tribal confederation.
Donghu	7th cent.-150 BC	Tribal confederation of Hu in Mongolia.
Dahae	pre 4th cent. BC-?	Ancient tribal confederation in Iran.
Sarmatians	3rd cent. BC-4th cent. AD	Confederation in Iran.
Massylii	202 BC	A Berber tribal confederation that formed Numidia.
Byeonhan confederacy	194 BC–42 AD	
Jinhan confederacy	194 BC – 4th cent. AD	
Belgae	pre 1st cent. BC-?	Confederation of tribes in northern Gaul.
Caledonian Confederacy	pre 1st cent.-3rd cent. AD	Confederation in Scotland during the Roman Empire.
Musulamii	pre 1st century AD-?	Berber tribal confederation that fought the Romans led by Tacfarinas.
Clan Chattan	?-present	Confederation of clans in the Scottish Highlands.
Maeatae	?-3rd cent. AD	Tribal confederation in Roman Britain.
Tanukhids	196-1100 AD	A confederation of Arab tribes.
Alemanni	213 AD - ?	A Confederation of Germanic Tribes that ruled the kingdom of Alamannia
Kabyle tribes	3rd cent. AD-?/present	Includes the Aït Djennad, Aït Ouaguenoun, Aït Idjer, Aït Betroun, Aït Iraten and Aït Mengellat confederations of the Kabyle people. The last three make up the Igawawen.
Rouran Khaganate	330-555 AD	Tribal confederation in east Asia which evolved into a state.
Nemencha	pre 5th century-?	Berber tribal confederation that formed a kingdom in the 5th century.
Tuareg Confederations	5th cent.-1905/1917/present AD	8 tribal confederations in the Sahara: Kel Ajjer, Kel Ahaggar, Kel Adagh, Kel Ataram, Kel Denneg, Kel Ayr, Kel Gres and Kel Owey.
Turkic tribal confederations	5th cent.-9th cent. AD	Onogurs, Utigurs, Kutrigurs, Uyghurs and the Saragurs.
Toquz Oghuz	603-? AD	Confederation of nine Turkic Tiele tribes.
Xueyantuo	628-723 AD	Confederation of two tribes which split from Tiele.
Türgesh	699-766 AD	Turkic tribal confederation.
Hawwara	pre 7th cent.-present	Berber-Arab tribal confederation in the Maghreb. In Ancient times, was part of Numidia.
Banu Hilal	pre 7th cent. AD-?/present	An Arab tribal confederation that migrated to the Maghreb in the Hilalian invasion of Ifriqiya with the support of the Fatimids.
Karluks	7th cent.-? AD	Confederation of three tribes, unclear if they achieved independence at one point.
Zenata	pre 8th cent. AD-?/present	Grouping of tribal confederations that bore the Zayyanids, Marinids and Wattasids. Made up of Jarawa and Maghrawa.
Tatar confederation	8th cent.-1202 AD	Tribal confederation in the Mongolian Plateau made up of 9 tribes.
Obotrites	8th cent.-1167	Tribal confederation of West Slavic tribes.
Magyar tribes	830 AD-?	Confederation of Hungarian tribes.
Danhāǧa	pre 9th cent. AD-?/present	Grouping of tribal confederations and component of the Sanhaja triad (1st type). Made up of Bavares, Igawawen and Quinquegentiani/Massylii. Bore the Zirids, Hammadids and Fatimids.
Aznag	pre 9th cent. AD-?/present	Grouping of tribal confederations and component of the Sanhaja triad (2nd type). Bore the Almoravids.
Sanhaja	pre 9th cent. AD-?/present	Grouping of tribal confederations and component of the Sanhaja triad (3rd type). Bore the Almohads and Hafsids.
Masmuda	pre 9th cent.-?	Grouping of tribal confederations in the Maghreb. Made up of Ghumara, Hintata and Barghawata.
Maqil	pre 11th cent. AD-?/present	A Bedouin nomadic tribal confederation which migrated to the Maghreb from South Arabia in the 11th cent..
Keraites	11th cent.-13th cent. AD	Nestorian tribal confederation in the Altai-Sayan region.
Merkit	11th cent.-1200 AD	Confederation of three tribes in the Mongolian Plateau.
Khamag Mongol	1130-1206 AD	Considered by some to be the predecessor state to the Mongol Empire.
Ja'alin tribe	pre 12th cent.-1820/present AD	An Arab or Arabised Nubian tribal confederation located in Shendi, Sudan.
Baggara	pre 14th cent.-?/present AD	A nomadic tribal confederation in Chad which played a key role in the Mahdist War.
Iroquois Confederacy	1451 AD-present	Five, later six, nations in the southern Great Lakes area. Initial members were the Mohawk, Oneida, Onondaga, Cayuga, and Seneca nations. The Tuscarora tribe joined in or around 1722
Al-Muntafiq Emirate	1530–1918 AD	Arab Tribal Confederation in southern Iraq and Kuwait
Ait Atta Confederation	16th cent. AD-?/present	Berber tribal confederation in south east Morocco.
Powhatan Confederacy	late 16th cent. – 1677 AD	Indian Confederation of Algonquian-speaking people in modern day Virginia.
Wabanaki Confederacy	1606–1862 AD, 1993 AD-present	A group of Native American nations in Canada and the United States.
Neutral Confederacy	1615 - 1653	
Iron Confederacy	pre 1692 - 1885 AD	
Sip Song Chau Tai	pre 17th cent.-1954 AD	Confederation of chiefdoms in mountainous north-west Vietnam. It came under French influence from 1889 to 1954, via Tonkin and then French Indochina.
Illinois Confederation	17th cent. - 1854 AD	
Wabash Confederacy	pre 1780s - ?	
Northwestern Confederacy	1783–1795 AD	Indian confederacy during the Northwest Indian War.
Confederated Tribes of Coos, Lower Umpqua and Siuslaw Indians	pre 1792 AD-present	
Zilan	pre 18th cent.-19th cent. AD	Confederation of Kurdish tribes on the Ottoman-Qajar frontier.
Ranquel Ulmanate	18th cent. - 1879	
Confederated Tribes of Warm Springs	pre 1800 AD-present	Confederation of three Native American tribes.
Confederated Salish and Kootenai Tribes	pre 1805 AD-present	Confederation of several Bitterroot Salish, Kootenai and Pend d'Oreilles tribes in the United States.
Tecumseh's confederacy	1805-1813 AD	Indian Confederation formed by Tecumseh.
United Tribes of New Zealand	1835 - 1840 AD	
Confederated Tribes of the Grand Ronde Community of Oregon	pre 1854 AD-present	Confederation of 27 Native American tribes.
Confederated Tribes of the Umatilla Indian Reservation	pre 1855 AD-present	Confederation of three Sahaptin-speaking Native American tribes.
Yakama Nation	pre 1855 AD-present	Confederation made up of Klikitat, Palus, Wallawalla, Wenatchi, Wishram, and Yakama peoples in the United States.
Confederated Tribes of Siletz Indians	pre 1855 AD-present	Confederation made up of 27 tribes and bands in the United States.
Confederated Tribes of the Chehalis Reservation	pre 1860 AD-present	Confederation of the Upper and Lower Chehalis people, Klallam, Muckleshoot, Nisqually, and Quinault peoples in the United States.
Khamseh	1861 AD-present	Tribal confederation in Iran.
Confederated Tribes of the Colville Reservation	pre 1872 AD-present	Confederation of 12 tribes in the United States.
Zayane Confederation	19th cent.-1920 AD	Tribal confederation formed by Mouha ou Hammou Zayani in the face of the French conquest of Morocco culminating in the Zaian War.
Confederated Tribes of the Goshute Reservation	pre 1912 AD-present	
Tekna	?-?/present	Sahrawi tribal confederation.
Reguibat	?-?/present	Sahrawi tribal confederation.
Blackfoot Confederacy	? - present	

== Supranational 'confederations' ==
A supranational union is a supranational polity which lies somewhere between a confederation that is an association of sovereign states and a federation that is a single sovereign state.

Name	Period	Notes
Central American Integration System	1907–present	Politico-economic union of states in Central America
Benelux	1944–present	Politico-economic union of Belgium, Netherlands, and Luxembourg.
Arab League	1945–present	Regional union of Arab states.
Organization of Ibero-American States	1949–present	Cultural union of Iberophone states.
European Union	1951–present	Continental union of European states with a range of powers from economic and political to security.
African Union	1963–present	Continental union of African states with a range of powers from economic and political to security, emphasising pan-Africanism.
Group of 77	1964–present	Coalition of developing countries designed to promote members' economic interests within the UN.
ASEAN	1967–present	Continental union of south-east Asian states with a range of powers from economic and political to security.
Pacific Islands Forum	1971–present	regional intergovernmental bloc
Caribbean Community	1973–present	Politico-economic union of Caribbean states and territories.
Gulf Cooperation Council	1981–present	Politico-economic union of states contiguous to the Persian Gulf.
Economic Cooperation Organization	1985–present	Politico-economic union of states in Central Asia, including Turkey and Iran.
South Asian Association for Regional Cooperation	1985–present	Continental union of states in South Asia.
Commonwealth of Independent States	1991–present	Union in Eurasia composed of post-Soviet states, with economic and security powers.
Organization of the Black Sea Economic Cooperation	1992–present	Politico-economic union on the Black Sea.
Eurasian Economic Union	1994–present	Economic union of post-Soviet states in Eurasia.
Union of South American Nations	2004–present	Continental union of states in South America set up by Hugo Chavez aimed at countering American influence in the region.
Community for Democracy and Rights of Nations	2006–present	Union of three breakaway states, Abkhazia, South Ossetia, and Transnistria.
Organization of Turkic States	2009–present	Union of Turkic states aimed at fostering unity between Turkic peoples.
Pacific Alliance	2011–present	Trade bloc of states in Latin America.
Confederation of Sahel States	2024–present	Confederation of Sahel States between Mali, Niger and Burkina Faso.

== See also ==
- List of proposed state mergers
