= Historic Centre of Agadez =

- Centre Historique d'Agadez (French)
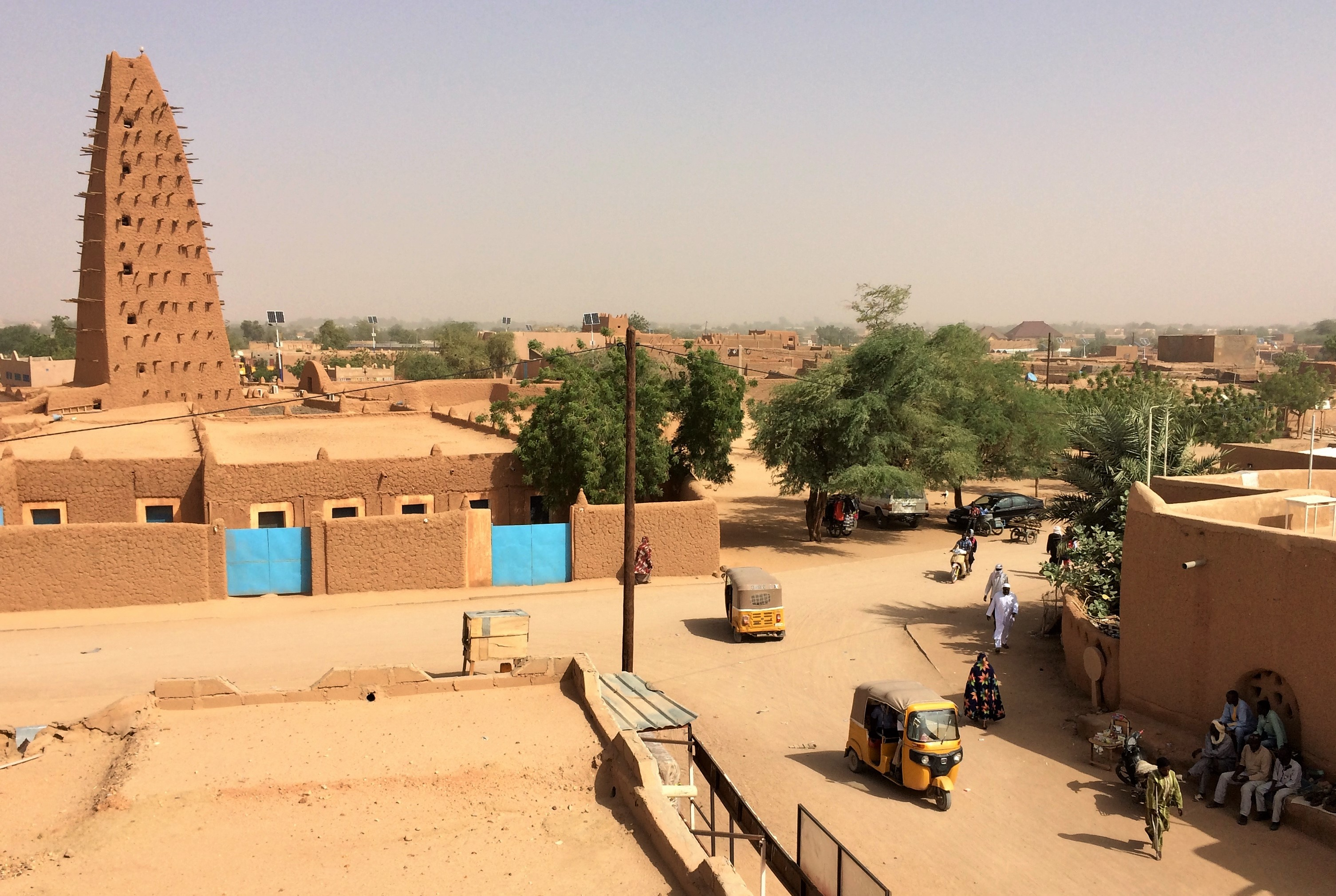
- Mosque of the Historic Centre of Agadez

- Location within Niger Location within Africa
- 16°58′25″N 7°59′29″E
- Type: Settlement
- Location: Agadez, Niger

UNESCO World Heritage Site
- Official name: Historic Centre of Agadez
- Type: Cultural
- Criteria: ii, iii
- Designated: 2013
- Reference no.: 1268
- Region: African States

The Historic Centre of Agadez is the historic district of the city of Agadez in Niger. It was listed as a UNESCO World Heritage Site in 2013.

== History ==
Known as the gateway to the desert, Agadez, on the southern edge of the Sahara desert, developed in the 15th and 16th centuries when the Sultanate of Aïr was established and Touareg tribes were sedentarized in the city, respecting the boundaries of old encampments, which gave rise to a street pattern still in place today. The historic centre of the city, an important crossroads of the caravan trade, is divided into 11 quarters with irregular shapes. They contain numerous earthen dwellings and a well-preserved group of palatial and religious buildings including a 27m high minaret made entirely of mud brick, the highest such structure in the world. The site is marked by ancestral cultural, commercial and handicraft traditions still practiced today and presents exceptional and sophisticated examples of earthen architecture.

== Sources ==
This article incorporates text from a free content work. Licensed under CC BY-SA IGO 3.0 (license statement/permission). Text taken from Historic Centre of Agadez, UNESCO World Heritage Centre.
