= Ifoghas =

Ifoghas may refer to:

- Adrar des Ifoghas, a sandstone massif in Mali's Kidal Region
- Kel Adagh (Kel Ifoghas), a confederation of Tuareg clans
