= Kel Owey =

The Kel Awey (var. Kel Owi, Kel Ewey form People of the Bull) are a Tuareg clan confederation. From the 18th century until the advent of French colonial rule at the beginning of the 20th century, they were a dominant power in the Aïr Mountains of north central Niger.

== History ==
The Kel Awey have, like many Tuareg confederations, been both a sub-group of other confederations and the dominant power over other clans. In 1740 the Kel Awey moved south from modern Algeria and destroyed the town of Assodé, sacked Agadez, placed the Sultanate of Agadez under their control, and dispersed the Kel Ayr to the south and west. The confederation was then under the direct suzerainty of the Anastafidet, lord of the Kel Awey. Heinrich Barth passed through the Aouderas valley with a Kel Awey trans-Saharan caravan in 1850, and reported that it was only recently that the Kel Awey had pushed the Kel Gres and Kel Itesen Tuareg south and west out of the valley. When the French appeared in force in the 1890s, they found the nomadic the Kel Awey confederation allied now to a confederation led by the Kel Ayr, but remaining the dominant power from the Aïr Mountains south to Damergu just north of Zinder.

=== Central Saharan trade ===
Throughout the 19th century the Kel Awey controlled the central of three main trade routes from the West African Sahel to the Mediterranean. Kel Awey caravans carried hides, gold, ostrich feathers and slaves north from the borders of the Sokoto Caliphate, beginning in Kano, Zinder, Agadez, the Air, to Ghat and Ghadames. The Kel Awey also for some time controlled the Agadez centered trade in salt and dates, called the Azalai. This trade was supplemented by grain grown in the fertile Air by bonded servile Tuareg classes, conquered communities, and slaves working plantation estates witnessed by Barth. Barth stayed at a series of estates held by the family of Annur, a high ranking Kel Awey noble, as well as those held by the Anastafidet himself, commenting on their extensive size, geographic spread, and the relative lack of restrictions on the labourers who were, technically, often first generation slaves. Barth reports in the Air seeing the southernmost use of plow agriculture, and detailing Kel Owey plantations, trade villages, and weigh stations deep in the territory of their southern neighbors at Tessawa and Damagaram, and mixed into the territory controlled by the Imazureg Tuareg around Gangara. From the date plantations and salt basins of the Kaouar, huge caravans transported good south to Zinder and Kano.

=== 20th century ===
After participating in a number of rebellions against French rule and being particularly hard hit by a series of famines in the second decade of the 1900s, their noble and warrior clans were almost destroyed, and some others of their constituent elements have been largely subsumed by other Toureg "Kel"s. The Kel Awey remain powerful in the central Aïr Massif, especially in the Bagzane plateau.

== See also ==
- Tuareg
  - Kel Adagh
  - Kel Ahaggar
  - Kel Ajjer
  - Kel Ayr
  - Kel Gres
  - Aulliminden: Kel Ataram (west) and Kel Dinnik (east)
