= Moussa Ag Amastan =

Amenokal (chief) of the Kel Ahaggar Tuareg

Musa Ag Amastan
- Amenokal of the Kel Ahaggar
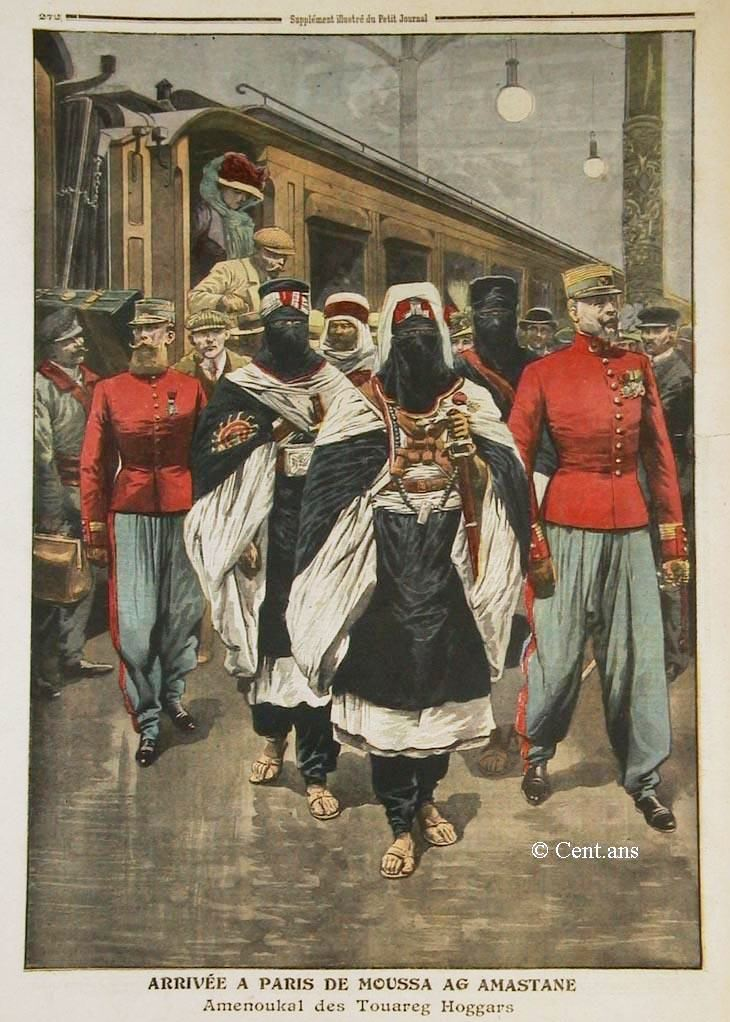
- Musa ag Amastan arriving in Paris (1910)
- Reign: 1905–1920
- Born: 1867; Hoggar Mountains, Algeria
- Died: 1920 (aged 52–53)
- Religion: Islam

Musa Ag Amastan (1867–1920) was the Chief (Amenokal) of the Kel Ahaggar Tuareg from 1905 to 1920. Based in the Ahaggar, he formed part of the Kel Ghela.

== Reign ==
Many of the French who had met Moussa noted his religiosity. Maurice Benhazera confirmed Moussa's religious fervour.

There are indications that Moussa's life did undergo a considerable change when he was about 30 years old (that is, c. 1897) in the form of an enhanced religiosity, which can be attributed to the spiritual mentorship of Bay al-Kunti who resided in Téleya in the Adrar des Ifoghas.

In 1901 Musa ag Amastan was part of the Kel Ahaggar coalition leading a rezzu (invasion) against the Berabich of Azawad submitted to the French authorities in Timbuktu.

It was during the summer of 1910 that he travelled in France. Led officially by the captain Niéger and accompanied by the commander Laperrine, his journey then took the name of "Mission Touareg".

== Quote ==
« Je ne pourrais pas vivre ici. Vous avez de la chance de les (toutes ces belles choses) posséder et de savoir vous en servir. Remerciez Dieu chaque jour. Il a été bon pour vous. ». (Translation: " I could not live here. You are lucky to have them (all these beautiful things) and know how to use them. Thank God every day. He has been good for you".

== Legacy ==
Antonello Padovano wrote and directed the film "The Four Doors of the Desert" based on Moussa Ag Amastan life and his love for Dassine Oult Yemma and his friendship with Father Charles de Foucauld.
