= Sultanate of Agadez =

Historical country and sultanate in Niger

Tenere Sultanate of Aïr
- Rough location of the Sultanate
- Status: State from 1405-16th c. 16th c.-1906 Currently a non-sovereign monarchy within Niger
- Capital: Agadez
- Common languages: Tamajeq, Arabic, Hausa
- Religion: Sunni Islam
- Government: Sultanate
- Amenukal
  - 1405-?: Yunus
  - 2016-present: Ibrahim Tsofo
- History
  - Establishment of the Sultanate: 1405
  - Conquered by Songhai and Kebbi: pre/early-16th century
  - Breaks away from Kebbi: Late 16th century
  - Incorporated into French West Africa: 1906
Preceded by
Kel Geres
Kel Ferwan
Kel Owey
Succeeded by
French West Africa

The Sultanate of Agadez (also known as Tenere Sultanate of Aïr, Sultanate of Aïr, or Asben) was a Berber kingdom centered first in the city of Agadez (initially, in the village of Tadaliza) in the Aïr Mountains, located at the southern edge of the Sahara desert in north-central Niger. It was founded in 1405 by the Tuareg. The Agadez Sultanate was later conquered by the Songhai Empire in 1500. After the defeat of the Songhai kingdom in 1591, the Agadez Sultanate regained its independence. It experienced a steep decline in population and economic activity during the 17th century. The sultanate came under French suzerainty in 1906. In the present day it is a non-sovereign monarchy in Niger.

== History ==
=== Origins ===
There are various accounts on the origins of the sultanate, dependent on the relationships among the drum-groups (descent-based clans) and confederations. Most traditions agree on there being a crisis among the Tuareg in the 14th century. The Itesen were the most powerful group, however their leader was not recognised by other groups. Oral history of the Aïr describes the foundation of the sultanate around 1405 by local Tuareg tribes seeking an inter-tribal organisation for mediation between different clans to settle disputes. For this, the first Sultan, Yunǝs or Yunus, was chosen for being the son of a distant Tuareg from Targa (Libya) and a local taklit or female slave, which made him politically neutral between the factions (Iṣandalăn, Itesăn, Ilisăwăn and Ibǝrkorăyăn) involved in the founding. From then on, every Sultan had to be married to a taklit, as to prevent tribal rivalries.

Yunǝs' successor and tegăze (nephew by his sister) Ălxăsăn (or Akkasan) transferred the seat of the Sultanate to the then recently (1413) founded Agadez, inhabited by Kel Gubǝr, Ibǝrkorăyăn and Igdalăn Tuareg, as well as Katsināwa Hausa merchants, who established the first indigo dyeing facilities. Every tribe had a district or quarter in the city where idǝrfan (freedmen) resided, although the tribes only visited occasionally since they retained their nomadic lifestyle. The region was initially inhabited by the Hausa of Gobir who were displaced south, and the document Kitab Asi Sultanati Ahyar I ("Chronicle of the Sultanate of Ayr I") mentions the Gobirawa as having migrated out of Agadez (Ayr).

Originally, the seat of the Sultanate was Tadaliza, and then Tin Chaman, which are now archaeological sites in the Air Mountains. Traditions state that the first sultan to be seated down in Agadez was Sultan Yusuf, who had moved there seeking more security following conflict with other groups. This occurred amidst various developments in the region in the 15th century as the Bornu Empire underwent a wave of expansionism and Katsina came under the dynasty of Muhammad Korau. Agadez served as a crucial trading centre in the trans-Saharan trade between the Hausa Kingdoms and North Africa.

=== 16th century onwards ===
Circa 1516-7 the Songhai Empire successfully campaigned against Agadez, led by a Hausa captain named Muhammadu Kanta. After not receiving his share, Kanta revolted against Songhai. Agadez was occupied by Kanta's Kebbi empire during their conflicts with the Songhai, which saw Kanta victorious. In the late 16th century after Kanta's death, Agadez broke away from Kebbi as Kano and Katsina supported a claimant.

In the 18th century, Tuareg confederacies from the north migrated south into the Air region, which led to unrest between the existing Tuareg confederacies in the Air region. By the end of the century, the Kel Geres were pushed south after being outnumbered by the Kel Owey.

German explorer Heinrich Barth visited Agadez in 1850 and described it as a ghost town, which was confirmed by French explorer Amédée-François Lamy at the time of his expedition.

The Sultanate fell under French administration in 1906.

=== Colonial rule and post-independence ===
At the time of the Kaocen Revolt, Sultan Tegama awaited the arrival of Kaocen, and after he was defeated by the French, the Sultan and many other conspirators fled the region. In 1917, the Sultan who had preceded Sultan Tegama was recalled by the French to Agadez to act as a mediator between the French administration and the people.

The sultan became involved in the Tuareg rebellion which was from 1990 to 1995. Modern traditions sometimes attribute the sultan's lineage to the sultan of Constantinople, however scholars have expressed scepticism. Regardless, it serves as a metaphor that allows the sultan to mediate disputes as an actor outside the local descent-based or alliance system.

== Government ==
The leader was called amenukal or sultan, and they were the traditional leader of drum-groups (descent-based clans) within the confederation. The amenukal had superior judicial rights and served as a war leader. Despite this, authority was limited and internal disputes were common. The female names of the first rulers according to oral tradition indicate that the Berber type of matrilineal descent was initially adopted. After losing sovereignty, the power of the local drum-chiefs decreased, and that of the amenukal increased. In the present day, the amenukal is a non-sovereign monarch in Niger, and spends much of their time in Niamey. They are in charge of tax collection and school registration.

== Culture and society ==
The population were called Kel Amenukal (lit. People of the Sultan). They are composed of Itesen, Kel Faday, Kel Ferwan, and Kel Geres. They are largely pastoralist, although some groups are sedentary or semi-sedentary. In the present day, most cultural events have moved from the amenukal's palace near the Agadez Mosque to the outskirts. Traditionally, the nomadic Tuareg viewed the outskirts of the city as their home, and only entered the city for trade and other business, and to lodge with clients.

== List of sultans ==
The following is a list of sultans/amenukal recorded in E. W. Bovill's Caravans of the Old Sahara (1933).

Tenure	Incumbent	Notes
1687–1721	Muhammad Agg-Abba ibn Muhammad al-Mubarak
1721	Muhammad al-Amin ibn Muhammad al-Mubarak (1st time)
1721	al-Wali ibn Muhammad al-Mubarak
1721	Muhammad al-Amin ibn Muhammad al-Mubarak (2nd time)
1721	Muhammad al-Mu'min
1721–1722	'Uthman ibn Muhammad al-Mu'min
1722–1735	Muhammad Agg-'A'isha ibn Muhammad Agg-Abba
1735–1739	Muhammad Humad ibn Muhammad al-Mubarak (1st time)
1739–1744	Muhammad Guma ibn al-'Adil
1744–1759	Muhammad Humad ibn Muhammad al-Mubarak (2nd time)
1759–1763	Muhammad Guma ibn 'Uthman
1763–1768	Muhammad Humad ibn Muhammad al-Mubarak (3rd time)
1768–1810	Muhammad al-'Adil ibn Muhammad Humad
1810–1815	Muhammad ad-Dani
1815–1816	Muhammad al-Baqiri
1816–1821	Muhammad Guma "Tabdali" (1st time)
1821–1828	Ibrahim Waffa
1828–1835	Muhammad Guma "Tabdali" (2nd time)
1835–1853	'Abd al-Qadir ibn Muhammad al-Baqiri
1853 – ....	Ahmad ar-Raffa' ibn Muhammad Guma (1st time)
.... – ....	Muhammad al-Baqiri "Sufu" (1st time)
.... – ....	Ahmad ar-Raffa' ibn Muhammad Guma (2nd time)
.... – ....	Muhammad al-Baqiri "Sufu" (2nd time)
.... – ....	Ibrahim ad-Dusuqi ibn Ahmad ar-Raffa' (1st time)
.... – 1903	Muhammad al-Baqiri "Sufu" (3rd time)
1903 – 1 Aug 1907	'Uthman Mikitan ibn Abd al-Qadir
1 Aug 1907 – 1908	Ibrahim ad-Dusuqi ibn Ahmad ar-Raffa' (2nd time)
1908 – 1917	'Abd ar-Rahman Taghama ibn Muhammad al-Baqiri
c. Mar 1917 – Apr 1917	Jatawa
6 May 1917 – Nov 1919	Ibrahim ad-Dusuqi ibn Ahmad ar-Raffa' (3rd time) (dismissed by the French)
Nov 1919 – 13 May 1920	Vacant
13 May 1920 – 1 Jan 1960	'Umaru Agg-Ibrahim
1 Jan 1960 – 21 Feb 2012	Ibrahim ibn 'Umaru (b. 1938 – d. 2012)
21 Feb 2012 – Dec 2016	'Umaru Ibrahim 'Umaru
23 Dec 2016 –	Ibrahim Tsofo
