= Kel Ayr =

Kel Ayr (also spelled Kel Aïr or Kel Ayer) was a semi-nomadic Tuareg tribal confederation. It ruled an area centered on the Aïr Mountains (Aïr Massif) in what is today Niger.

Forming sometime after the 11th century CE, the Kel Ayr were one of the earlier Tuareg groups to arrive in the Aïr. They pushed out the Hausa, who later became identified with Gobir (the Gobirawa) and other states to the south. Kel Ayr controlled the sedentary populations of the trading and farming centers in Assodé, Agadez, In-Gall, Timia and Iferouane. The Songhai Empire seized Agadez, Ingall, and centers to the south and west in 1500, but lost control before the end of the century. Along with the Kel Gres, Tesen and Issandalan confederations, the Kel Ayr controlled the region and helped found the Sultanate in Agadez. In 1740 the large Kel Owey destroyed the town of Assodé, sacked Agadez, placed the Sultanate of Agadez under their control, and dispersed the Kel Ayr to the south and west. The confederation was then under the direct suzerainty of the Anastafidet, lord of the Kel Owey. Between the 1850s and the 1890s, the Kel Owey and the central Aïr again fell under control of the Key Ayr, and the Ayr again retained control of Agadez, the Kouar oases, and the Azalai salt caravans, which they continue to operate.

As of the 1980s, population estimates for the Kel Ayr range from 55,000 to 20,000, in part because of the decision of which tribes to include, and whether to include the sedentary population (the Ikelan or Bella) whom the Tuareg groups ruled until at least independence.

== Existing Kel Ayr groups ==
To the west of Aïr in the Tamesna plain:

- Kel Gharous
- Kel Tadele
- Kel Tamat (now more identified with the Kel Owey): ~4800 in 1979
  - Ikazkazan (part centered near Arlit). A second branch is associated with the Kel Ulli/Kel Gres to the south, near Zinder.

To the southwest of Aïr:

- Kel Fadey (centered at Tchimoumenene; nomadize in regions around In-Gall): ~1780 in 1979.
- Igdalen (part). Igdalen sub groups form a religious class in many Tuareg confederations
- Kel Ferwan (or Kel Ferouane) to the south of the Aïr Mountains, but originally migrating to the area in the 14th century CE: ~6000 in 1979.
- Kel Temezguidda

In the colonial period the Kel Ayr led a large confederation which included most of these groups, but also held sway over the Kel Owey and Kel Tamat in the central Aïr Massif.

== See also ==
- Tuareg
  - Kel Adagh
  - Kel Ahaggar
  - Kel Ajjer
  - Kel Gres
  - Kel Owey
  - Aulliminden: Kel Ataram (west) and Kel Dinnik (east)
