= Ouled Derradj (tribe) =

- Algerian tribe
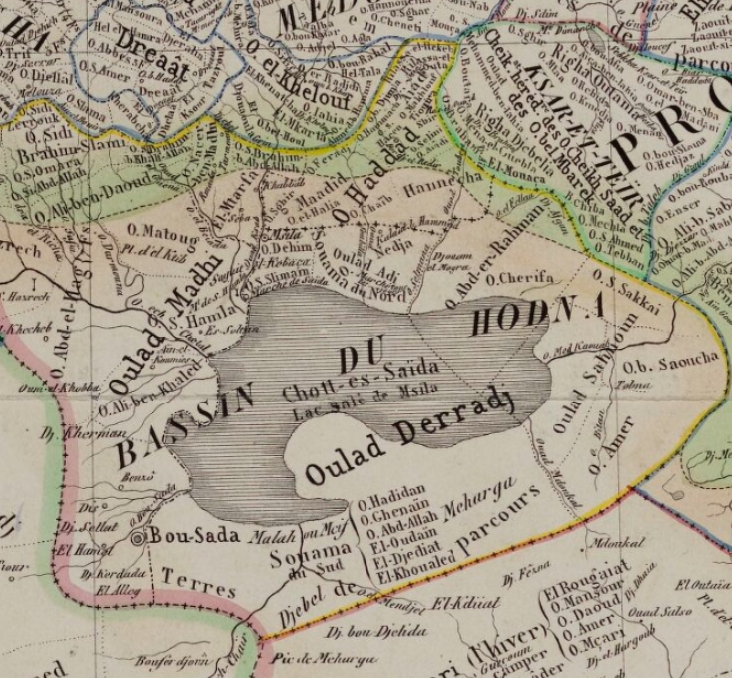
- Location: Hodna
- Descended from: Banu Hillal maraboutic lignage of Seguia el-Hamra; Kabyle; Maghrebi Jews
- Religion: Sunni Islam

The Ouled Derradj are more of a mosaic of factions than a tribe, and have little cohesion. It is difficult to see among the Ouled Derradj, what is the original core of the tribe. The Ouled Hariz of Selalha, are Latifs, Athbedj of origin of the Banu Hilal. The Mtarfa include Mortafe who are Ahtbedj cited by Ibn Khaldoun. The legendary stories attribute to Sidi Othman el Derradji, the paternity of the Ouled Derradj and it is not impossible that a marabout having gathered the factions bequeathed them his name. It seems that the active element seems to have formed around Hilalians of the Athbedj branch. Another hypothesis is that it seems that the Ouled Derradj are only an Arabized Berber tribe.

After El Derradji, other marabouts from Saguia el-Hamra arrived: in the 15th and 17th centuries. The Athbedj and marabouts were joined by other groups: nomads from the South (including Ouled Naïl), Zibbans and Tell or Hodna. The entire mountainous area that surrounds Hodna to the North and North-East provided a large number of migrants: Ouled Maadid, Righa and Kabyles: the Bratikiya are from Kalaa of Ait Abbas or Zemmoura, the Amayers of Selman are from Mzita, the Menaifa of Berhoumm are partly Kabyles from Akbou and the Gaoua of Djezzar are Igawawen from Djurdjura. Some groups are of Moroccan Jewish origin: the Hammari (Ouled Adi Guebala) and the Ouled Messaoud (Bou Hamadou). The reputation of the Ouled Derradj is bad: in the 18th century the traveler el Ouarthilâni judges them ignorant, brutal, quarrelsome and tyrannical for the sedentary people of Mdoukal. Their reputation has not changed in the 19th century.
