= Iwellemmedan people =

Tuareg confederation

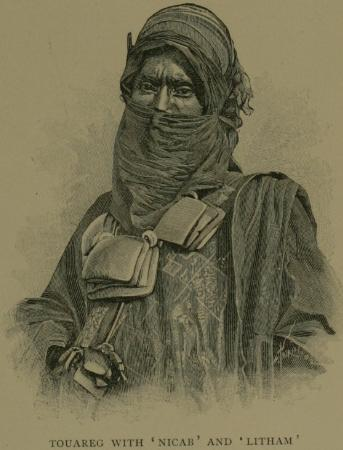
French view of a Tuareg man from Timbuktu, c.1890s.

The Iwellemmedan (Iwəlləmədǎn), also spelled Iullemmeden, Aulliminden, Ouilliminden, Lullemmeden, and Iwellemmeden, are one of the seven major Tuareg tribal or clan confederations (called "Drum groups"). Their communities are historically nomadic and intermixed with other ethnic groups. The Iwellemmeden inhabit a wide area ranging from east and north central Mali, through the Azawagh valley, into northwestern Niger and south into northern Nigeria. While once a single confederation of dozens of Tuareg clans, subject peoples, and allied groups, since the 18th century they have been divided into Kel Ataram (west) and Kel Dinnik (east) confederations.

Following colonial rule and independence, the Iwellemmedan homelands cross the Mali/Niger border, and their traditional seasonal migration routes have spread Iwellemmedan communities into Burkina Faso and Nigeria as well. They speak the Tawellemmet variant of the Tamasheq language, although some current or historical sub-clans speak other Tamasheq variants as well as Songhai languages and Arabic dialects.

== Divisions ==
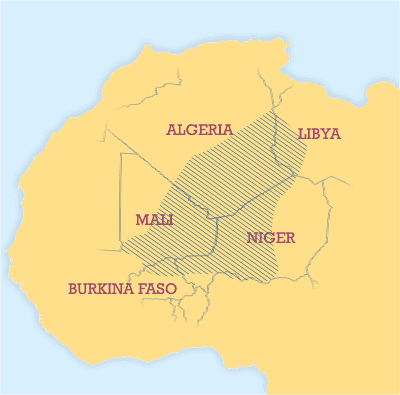
Areas where significant numbers of Tuaregs live

The origins of the division into Kel Ataram ("people of the west") and Kel Dinnik ("people of the east") goes back to at least 1800, and perhaps a century earlier. The confederation remained divided under colonial rule, with the Nigerien arm to the east given its own official "chief", while after 1916, the western arm was re-divided among a number of official French chosen chieftainships. The division of eastern and western Iwellemmedan remains in the post-colonial period.

The western arm of the Iwellemmedan is the Kel Ataram centered on the Malian town of Ménaka. Component "free" clans (mostly "maraboutic" or "Imajeghen" tribes which inherit local religious leadership) include the Tahabanaten and Ighatafan.

The major eastern arm of the confederation is the Kel Dinnik (var. Kel Dinnig), sometimes named the "Ouilliminden Kel Dinnik", and centered in the Azawagh, near Tchin-Tabaraden and Tahoua. Their major "free"/"Imajeghen" components include the Irreulen, Lisawan, Tiggirmat, Tellemidez, and Ikhekheren. The free/noble Kel Nan clan is the traditional source of the Amenokal, the paramount confederation leader chosen by clan heads.

Both groups are traditionally pastoralists, whose migration patterns take them north into the Sahara during the brief rainy season, and south as far as Nigeria and Burkina Faso during the dry season.

Like all Tuareg groups, they are formed from a number of highly stratified castes, who interweave loyalty from a number of clans, some of whom are limited to specific castes. Ruling caste clans lead the large confederations, and engage in seasonal migration, herding, trade, war, and religious duties. Lower castes, and clans made up of subject groups of free clans are more likely sedentary and not part of confederations, even if their traditional suzerains are members of a confederation such as the Iwellemmedan. In addition, large confederations may include allied non-Tuaregs, such as local Arabic speaking tribes.

== History ==
Tuareg groups moved south into what is now Mali and Niger sometime around the 11th century CE, and the Iwellemmedan were established south and east of the Adrar Ifoghas by the 17th century CE. Contesting oral histories agree that the Iwellemmedan came into conflict with the Kel Taddemekat confederation, but disagree whether the Iwellemmedan were pushed out of the Adrar Ifoghas by their foes or conquered Kel Taddemekat territory south and west of the massif. Regardless, by the mid-15th century CE, the Iwellemmedan controlled an area from Lake Faguibine and north of Timbuktu east through all of what is now the Gao Region of Mali, into the Nigerien Azawagh all the way to the edge of the Aïr Massif.

Engaged in long struggle with the inheritors of the 15th century CE Moroccan conquest of the Songhai Empire, the Iwellemmedan Kel Ataram clans eventually imposed indirect rule over Timbuktu, along with all of the Niger River valley from the Niger inland delta to what into the town of Say, Niger. The Kel Ataram were only driven from Timbuktu in 1826 by the rise of the Fula Macina Empire, but retained much of the area to its north.

At the moment of colonial expansion by the French into their territory at the end of the 19th century, the Iwellemmedan were the dominant Tuareg confederation in all western Niger and eastern Mali, down to the bend of the Niger River, where they held sway of many of the Songhay settlements. Following their defeat by the French after their seizure of Timbuktu in 1894, the Kel Ataram Amenokal pledged non-aggression with the French in 1896, and eventual peace in 1903. At this same time, the French concentrated on their conflict with the Kel Ifoghas to the north. Within a decade, roles were reversed, when the Ifoghas helped to put down the 1914–1916 rising of the Iwellemmedan and allied clans under their Amenokal Fihirun. Their resistance to French conquest cost them dearly, with the deaths of much of their warrior class, and the eventual favoriting of the Kidal based Kel Ifoghas by the colonial power. Several elements were eventually broken from the Iwellemmedan Kel Ataram by the French, further weakening the confederation.

The eastern Iwellemmedan Tuaregs' traditional homeland is in Niger. However, severe droughts in 1972 and 1982 forced the nomadic Iwellemmedan to migrate south to Nigeria in search of grazing areas for their animal herds. Many Aulliminden eventually moved closer to populated areas. These Tuaregs settled in the outskirts of cities in northern Nigeria, and many never returned to their homeland.

In the 1970s, large numbers of Tuareg refugees, many of them Iwellemmedan, settled in the refugee camps of southern Niger, most prominently Lazert, on the northeastern edge of Niamey. Over time this has become a permanent neighborhood within the Nigerien capital.

== See also ==
- Tuareg
  - Kel Adagh
  - Kel Ahaggar
  - Kel Ajjer
  - Kel Ayr
  - Kel Gres
  - Kel Owey
- History of Niger
- History of Mali
