= Kel Ajjer =

Tuareg confederation

Kel Ajjer (also Kel Azjar, Kel Azjer) is a Tuareg confederation inhabiting in southwestern Libya and southeastern Algeria. Their main stronghold was Ghat, followed by Ubari, both in the Fezzan region of southwestern Libya and Djanet south of the Tassili n'Ajjer in Algeria. The Kel Ajjer speak Tamahaq, or Northern Tuareg.

== Population ==
=== Situation of camel breeders ===
A 2021 study examined the situation of camel breeders in the municipality of Bordj Omar Driss. This area is traditionally the territory of the Iforhas ethnic group. For the Wilaya (province) of Illizi, the total number of owners/breeders is given as 321, with around 23,000 camels. In the Bordj Omar Driss area, with 47 breeders and around 3,000 camels, just under three-quarters were pure breeders, the others were breeders and fatteners, and one bred racing camels. The age distribution of the breeders was balanced, so there is a new generation coming through. The main source of income is the sale of camels as a source of meat. The majority of breeders still earn additional income, either as municipal employees, traders, or keepers of small livestock (sheep and goats). Three-quarters of those surveyed are sedentary, living in a settlement and having their herds looked after by shepherds. The rest live as semi-nomads, traveling with their herds to different grazing areas while the rest of the family lives in a settlement. However, the herd is only supervised from September to March (mating season), while for the remaining five months the herd is unattended.

== On the history of the Kel Ajjer ==
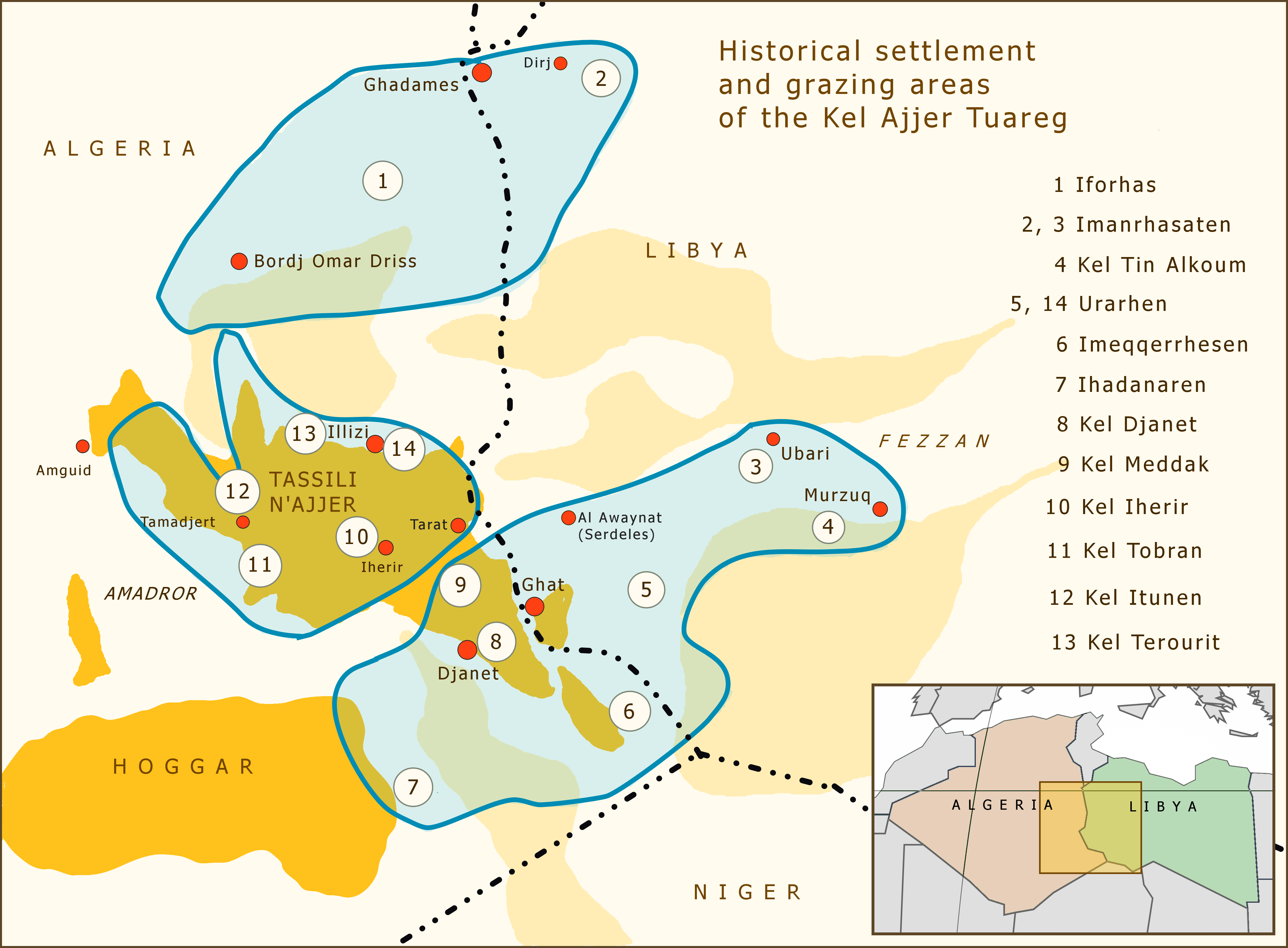
Historical settlement and grazing areas of the Kel Ajjer Tuareg

=== Colonization of the Kel Ajjer ===
The 19th century was characterized by disputes among the Tuareg and with the Chaambas people of Arab descent and by rezzous (Note: Rezzous were raids by looters who stole animals or crops) and contre-rezzous. - In 1830, Algiers was occupied by the French. Over the next 14 years, they advanced as far as the first large oases on the northern edge of the Sahara. In 1858, Marshal Randon, the Governor General of the colony of Algeria, set the goal of connecting the colonial territories in North Africa with those in Sudan (now the Sahel) with trans-Saharan routes. Initially, this was to be done peacefully.

That same year, Randon sent Bou Derba, a local army interpreter and Muslim, on an exploratory journey as far as Ghat. He reached this destination thanks to the protection of Sheikh Osman, the pro-French chief of the Kel Ajjer ethnic group of the Iforhas. He was followed by other explorers, above all Henri Duveyrier, who visited the land of the Kel Ajjer in 1860/61. However, from 1870 onwards, such journeys became too dangerous because conflicts broke out between the Tuareg and resistance to French colonization began to form.

From 1874 to 1878 there was a war between the Kel Ajjer and the Kel Ahaggar. There were three battles and the Kel Ahaggar emerged victorious in the first and third. However, the Kel Ajjer were not yet ready to make peace. Subsequently, there were further rezzous, including revenge campaigns, with many deaths and losses of possessions, until peace was concluded in 1878.

In 1880, France sent the Flatters expedition to the Kel Ajjer region. It was to explore a possible route for a planned trans-Saharan railroad line. Henri Brosselard, one of the officers of the expedition, wrote in his report after the encounter with leaders of Kel Ajjer ethnic groups:

The Tuareg are tall, strong and lithe, with an energetic demeanor. ... They look truly imposing, reminiscent of the knights-errant of the Middle Ages. Moreover, their appearance is anything but reassuring, and once you have seen them, you understand the respect, mixed with fear, that they inspire in their friends, the Chambaas, and the legends of which they are the heroes.

However, as Colonel Flatters did not receive permission to cross from the Amenukal of the Kel Ajjer, he and his party returned the same way. In December of the same year, Flatter's second expedition began. This time the route was to lead directly to the south, via the territory of the Kel Ahaggar in the Hoggar Mountains region, although Flatters had been warned by the Ahaggar that he was not welcome. The expedition ended in disaster. As a result, the French made no further attempts to penetrate further south into the Sahara in the following years.

==== The Ottomans and the Senusiyya ====
In the second half of the 19th century, the Senusiyya developed into an important religious and political force in southern Libya. At the beginning of the 20th century, Ghat was one of their religious centers. The Sanusi were also politically influential there, although the city nominally belonged to the Ottoman Empire until 1911. The inhabitants of Ghat and some of the Kel Ajjer sympathized with them, especially Sheikh Amoud Ag El Mokhtar, the last chief of the Imenan ethnic group. He became the representative of the Senusiyya in Djanet and vehemently opposed the French colonization plans.

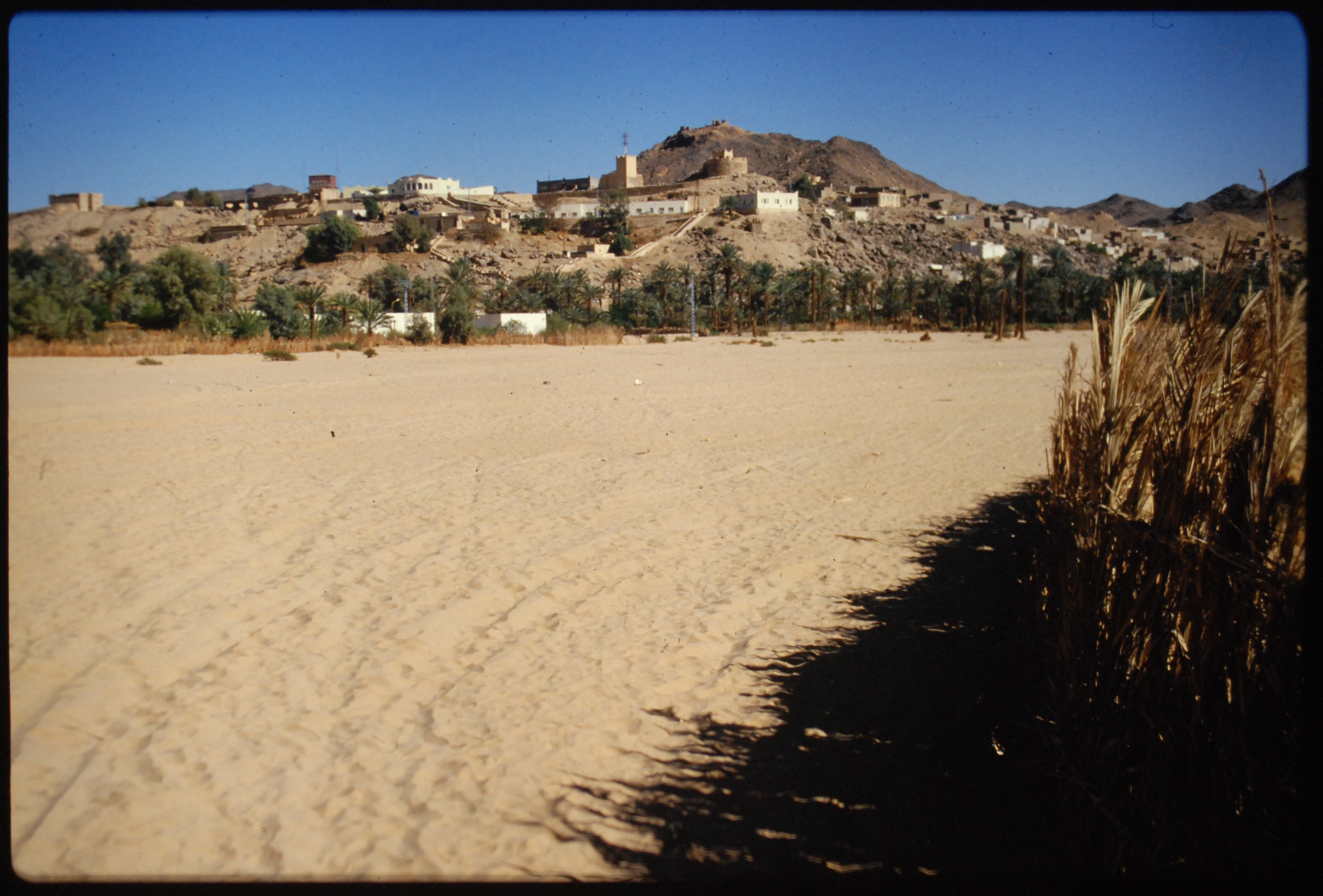
Djanet with the old Fort Charlet

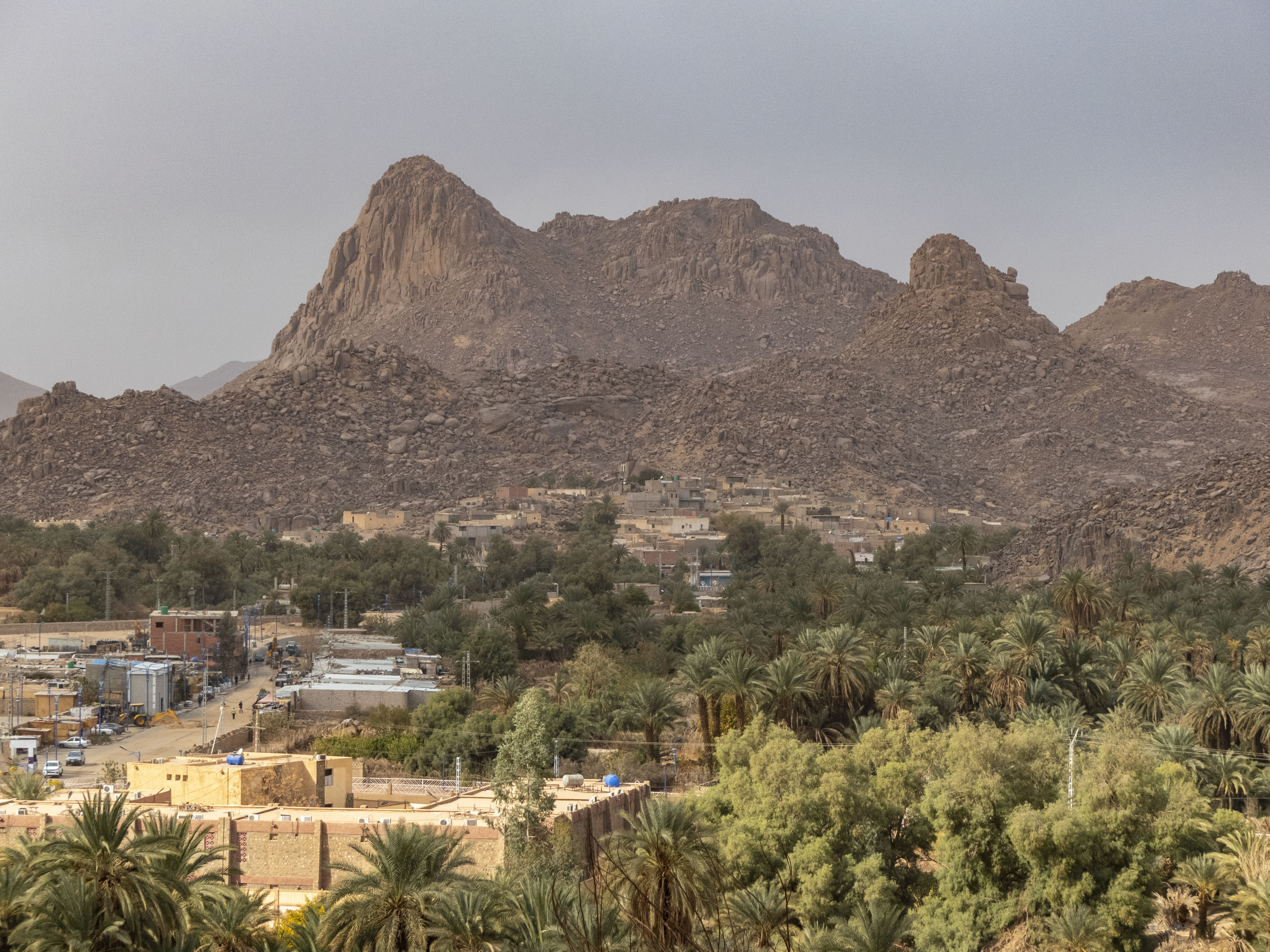
Djanet: Azelouaz ksar in the background

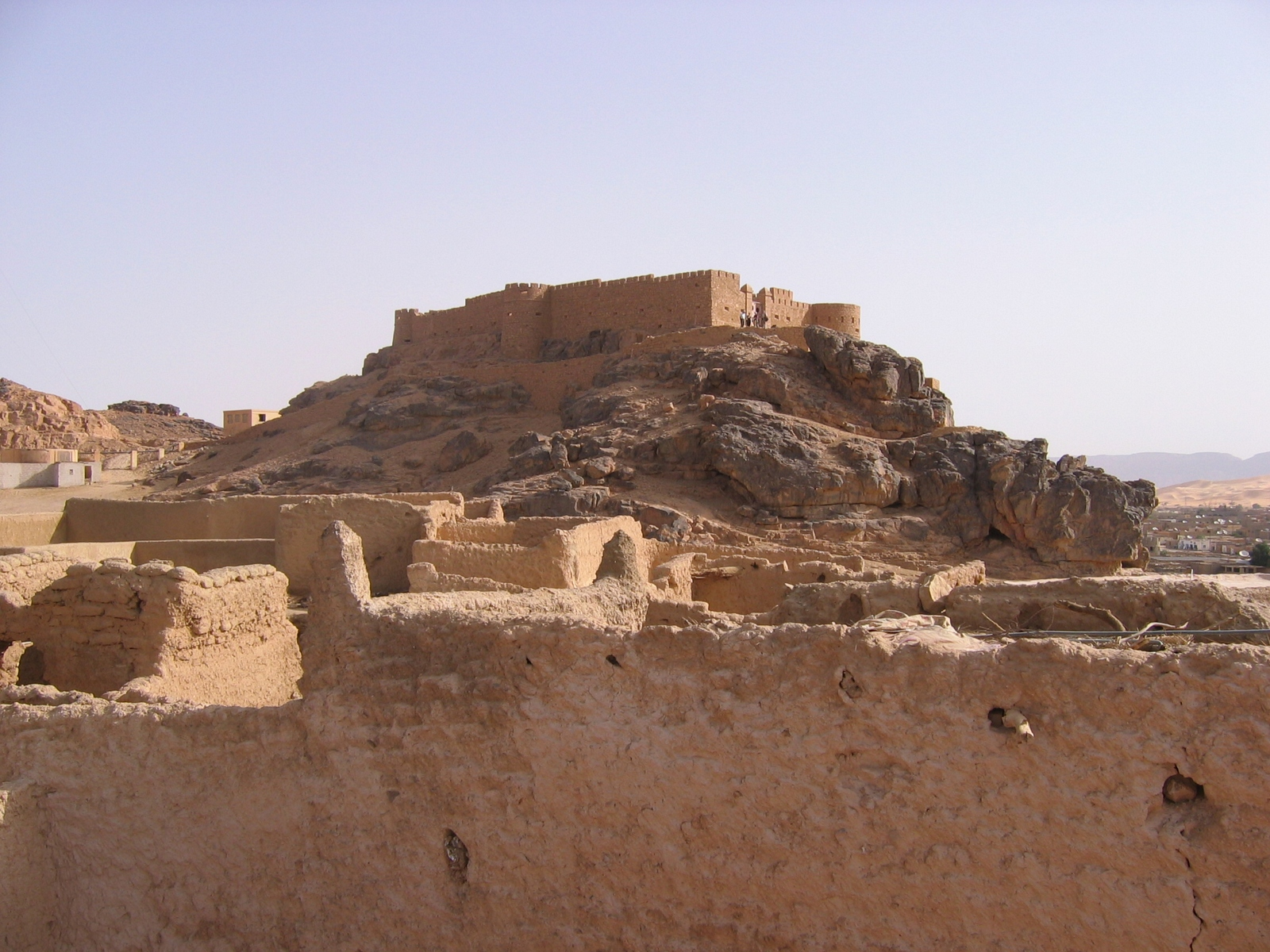
Fort Ghat, built in 1930 by the Italian colonial power

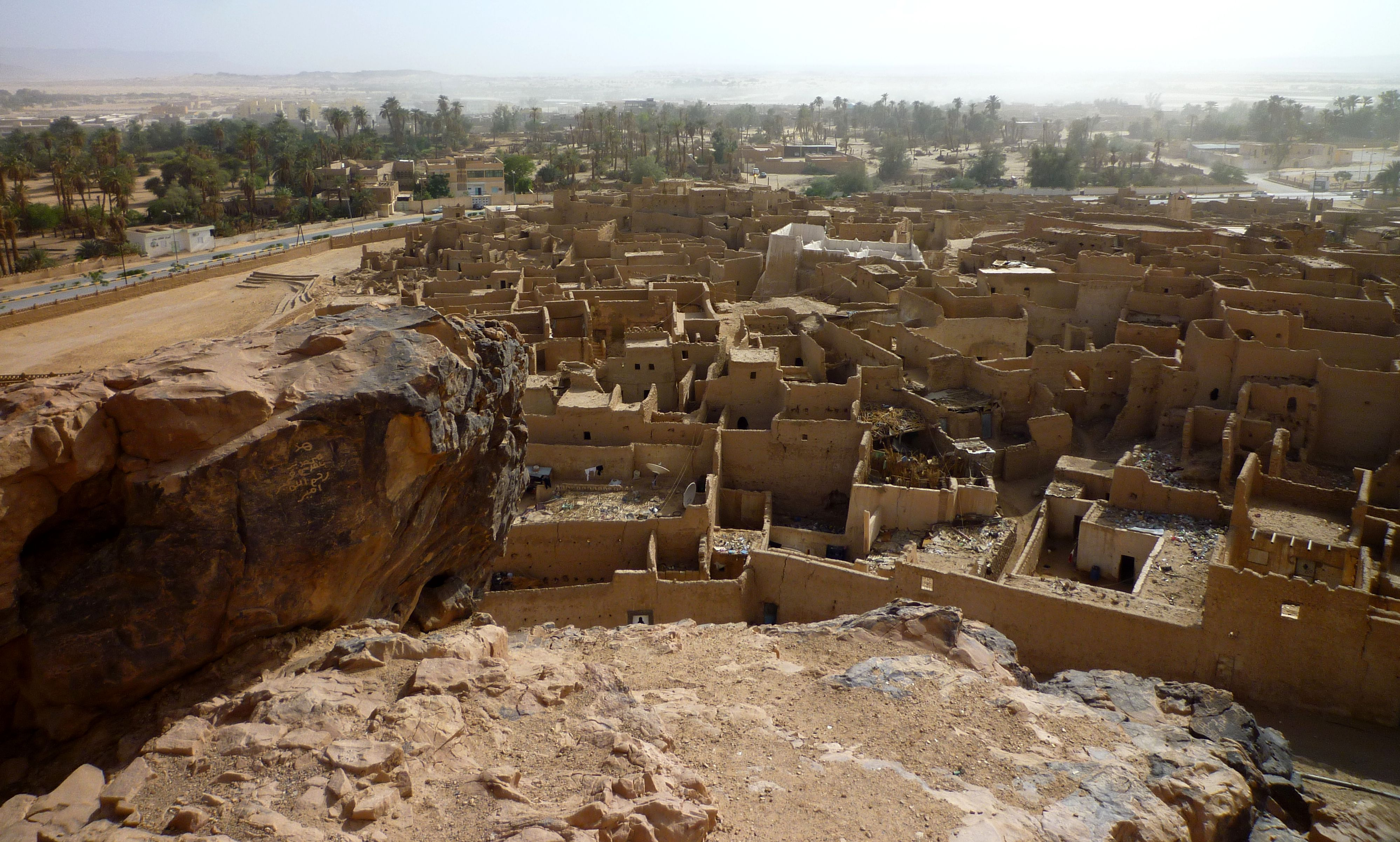
Ghat: Old town, view from the fort

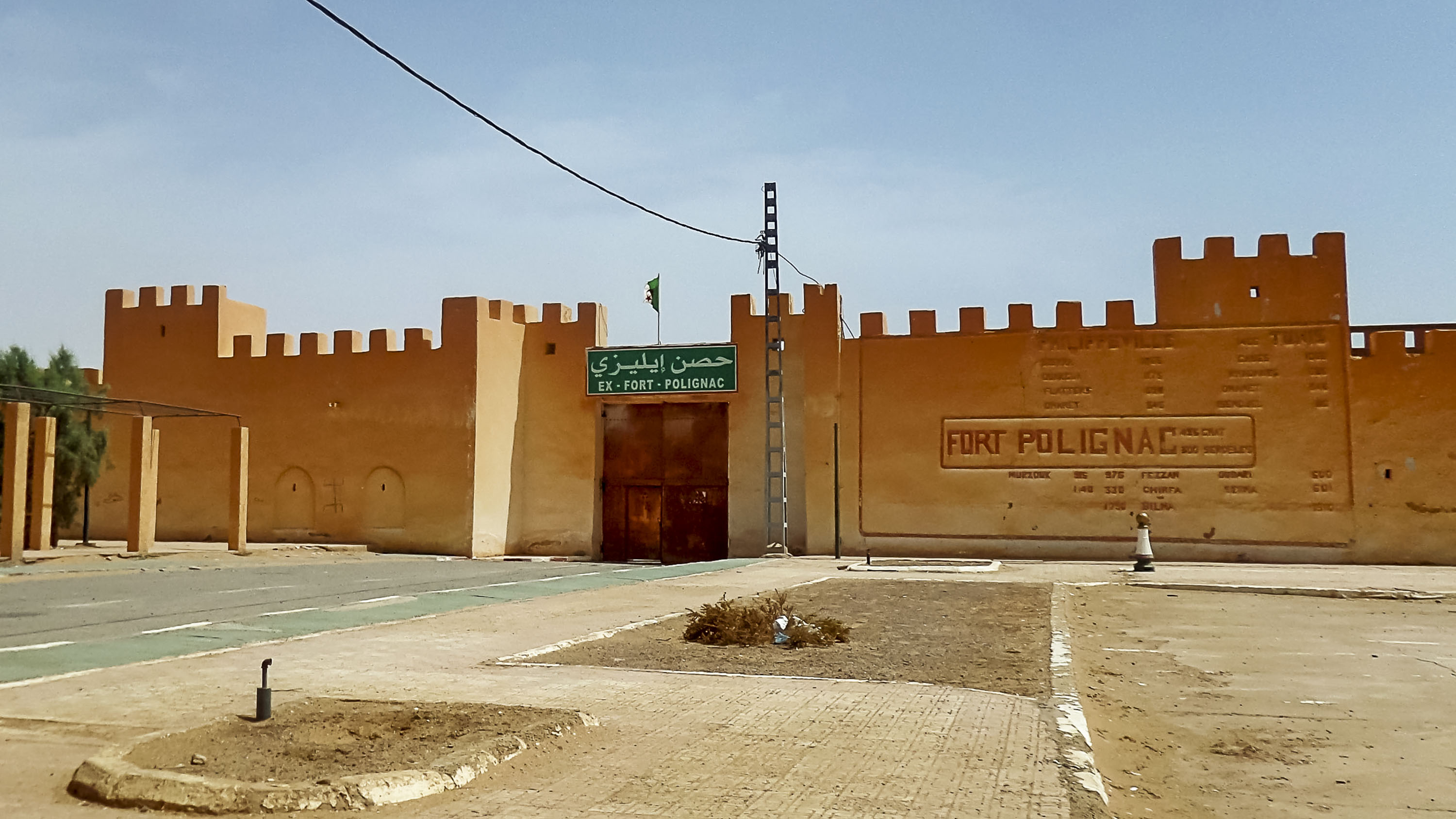
Fort Polignac, today in Illizi

==== The French in the Kel Ajjer region ====
At the end of December 1899, the French definitively occupied the oasis of In Salah. This worried the Kel Ahaggar, and as a result some of their ethnic groups moved eastwards to the Kel Ajjer and Fezzan regions. They wanted to submit to the Turks rather than the French. Together with leaders of Kel Ajjer ethnic groups, they asked the Pasha in Tripoli for weapons and support and later began rezzias in areas where the Tuareg had placed themselves under French protection.

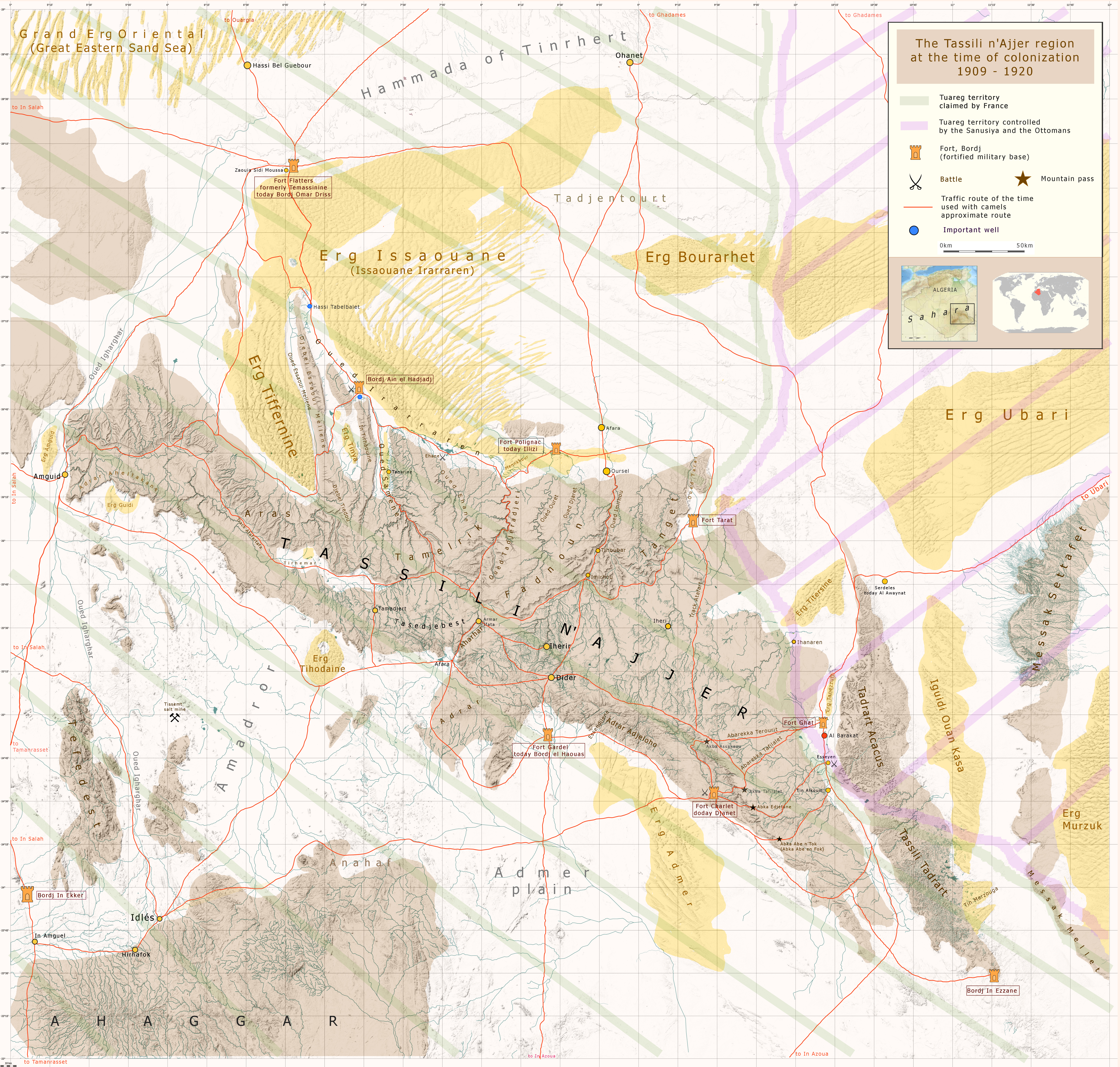
Situation map Tassili n'Ajjer and surroundings 1909-1920

At the end of June 1903, the French captain Pein arrived in Temassinine (today Bordj Omar Driss) with a goum. (Note: Contingent of fighters recruited from the indigenous population) They then advanced as far as Tarat, a settlement east of Illizi. But the Tuareg avoided a confrontation. - In 1904, the French Fort Flatters was built near Temassinine. In the summer and fall of 1904, the Chaambas, with French approval, carried out several rezzous on the Kel Ajjer and as far as the Fezzan and abducted more than 1000 camels. - On December 10, 1904, the French captain Touchard left Temassinine with a goum of 200 Meharists (Note: camel riding troops, at that time mainly recruited from Chaambas) and made his way to Tarat without incident. There he met the leaders of three Ajjer ethnic groups who submitted to the French. Touchard's mission then crossed the Tassili n'Ajjer plateau via Iheri and reached Djanet on January 19, 1905, without encountering any resistance, where Touchard was the first European to enter. The inhabitants were frightened, but did not resist. Their leader, Sultan Amoud, was absent. After a few days, the troop left Djanet again. On the way back, detachments were sent out to investigate the theft of camels and weapons, which led to confiscations.- The Ottomans protested against these actions through diplomatic channels and laid claim to Djanet. The border between the Ottoman Empire and the French colonial power had not yet been settled in the area south and north of Ghat as far as Ghadames.

Until the end of 1911, there were repeated rezzous, even those with more than 100 participants, which were approved or tolerated by the French or the Turks if they harmed the other side. They themselves were not involved with their troops, but pursued the enemy participants on their territory. - During this time, the French were on the move with smaller troops in the Tassili n'Ajjer to mediate, but also to show their presence. They were aware that if they took tough action, many ethnic groups would retreat to Turkish territory. Meanwhile, the Turks, the Senusiyya and Sheikh Amoud were also trying to bring Ajjer ethnic groups under their influence.

In the spring of 1908, Colonel Laperrine, commander of the French Sahara troops, visited the Kel Ajjer area to get an idea of the situation. In the Oued Ilezi, he determined the exact location of the future Fort Polignac (at today's Illizi), the construction of which began and was completed in November 1909. He also decided that ethnic groups who did not wish to submit to the French would no longer be allowed to return to their territories, for example to graze or harvest dates on their land. - In July 1909, a French contingent under Captain Niéger entered Djanet without resistance and demanded that the Turkish flag be removed from the various ksur. However, the Kel Djanet did not want to submit to the French, as they considered Sultan Amoud to be their leader. He did not show himself again. - Two years later, in November 1911, the French under Captain Charlet once again occupied Djanet without resistance. The inhabitants behaved more benevolently than when the French had last visited. Instead of the Zawiya of the Senusiyya, a Bordj (military fortification) was built on the hill and subsequently occupied.

=== The “heroic” period 1913–1920 ===
==== The battle at Esseyen ====
In the spring of 1913, a rumor spread in Djanet that there was an accumulation of troops in the region of Ghat and that an attack on Djanet was being prepared. But the French military (Note: Only a small part of the French colonial army consisted of Frenchmen, namely the cadre, i.e. the officers and some of the non-commissioned officers. The troops in the Algerian Sahara consisted of Meharists and Goumiers, auxiliary troops who were mostly recruited from the population of the northern Sahara.) found no confirmation of this. In March, Lieutenant Gardel was on his way south to the French Bordj In Ezzane with a detachment of around 45 Meharists and two French non-commissioned officers on their riding camels. On the way, he received a message that the troop deployment at Ghat existed and that he should make inquiries about it. On April 7, the formation reached Tin Alkoum and advanced as far as Esseyen. At midday the following day, their scouting party reported that an enemy detachment of around 300 men was advancing in their direction. This led to a fierce battle in the dunes there. Amoud's fighters were outnumbered, had better rifles and plenty of ammunition. They soon had the French contingent surrounded and their camels shot. The exchange of fire continued into the night. Gardel sent a Tuareg through the enemy lines to Djanet with an urgent request for support.

The next morning, the French forces saw their opponents' reinforcements approaching in the distance. Gardel then launched a desperate attack with bayonets fixed. Her opponents were surprised by the fierce fighting spirit, their shots missed and they fled. In the ensuing carnage, there were numerous dead and wounded on Amoud's side. His warriors were pursued by the enemy. They were left with 47 dead, while the victors reported two dead and ten wounded. - The subsequent march of the French forces with the wounded across the Tassili n'Ajjer was difficult. However, they were caught up with and supported by the relief force with Captain Charlet. - Gardel was later awarded the Order of the French Legion of Honour for his services, and all his subordinates were awarded military or colonial decorations.

==== Military actions 1916 to 1920 ====
Three years later, in the spring of 1916, Sultan Amoud, with the help of the Sanusi, had once again assembled a considerable fighting force in Ghat, French sources speak of several hundred men. Among them were also deserted Meharists. On March 6, they reached Djanet and laid siege to Fort Charlet. It was defended by the French sergeant Lapierre and 44 Goumiers. The fort was under fire for 18 days from a cannon that the Sanusi had captured from the retreating Italians in 1914 and which caused considerable damage. On March 20, their only water access was destroyed and the relief force requested at Fort Polignac had not yet arrived. On the night of March 24, their second attempt to break out succeeded. They fled into the mountains, where they searched for a well. Amoud's troops occupied the fort and sent reconnaissance troops. The French relief force reached Djanet, but far outnumbered, they withdrew again. - On the way, Lapierre lost more and more of his men, who deserted. He was taken prisoner with the last six Chaambas. - In May of the same year (1916), the French column Meynier retook Djanet with 1000 men. In June, however, it was abandoned again. This outpost of the French colonial army was too remote and supplies were not guaranteed. - Sheikh Amoud moved back into Djanet and continued to try to push back the French colonial power with raids, and battles, which he and his Tuareg temporarily succeeded in doing.

Brahim ag Abakada was another leader of Kel Ajjer ethnic groups. His father was a Urarhen from the Kel Imirhou. Brahim had great influence on the Kel Ajjer in the area between the Oued Imirhou (west of Tarat) and Aharhar (west of Iherir). Brahim opposed the influence of the Senusiyya and offered the French to fight with his Tuareg against the Senusiyya. However, his terms were not acceptable to them. In response, he and his Tuareg fought the French troops with numerous attacks and kidnappings. In February 1917, there was a battle at Ain el Hadjadj in the Oued Irarraren, 125 km northwest of Illizi. The French forces were hard pressed and suffered heavy losses. As a result, the French withdrew from the Tassili n'Ajjer region. - In October 1918, a so-called pacification operation by the French colonial troops followed, in which goumiers and Tuareg from Kel Ahaggar were involved. The aim was to use a show of force to persuade the rebellious Kel Ajjer to cooperate and submit to “the French peace” (La paix française). Djanet was recaptured in the process. - At the end of February 1919, an agreement was reached between Brahim and the French, in which he and his Tuareg placed themselves under French command. They gave him the title of Amghar of the Imrad of the Tassili.

==== End of the fighting ====
In July 1920, a French military column was on the move in the Tassili n'Ajjer region and definitively conquered Djanet on July 20. It was made up again of Goumiers and Kel Ahaggar-Tuareg of Moussa Amastane, the Amenukal of the Kel Ahaggar. Amoud's troops retreated into the mountains, but were pursued by 140 Meharists and 30 Goumiers under the command of a French non-commissioned officer. The battle took place in the gorge-like terrain below the Assakao Pass, north of Djanet. The 250 Ajjers were defeated and left 27 dead, the victors lost 10 men.

By the end of 1920, the Kel Ajjer's resistance to the French occupation had collapsed and the “heroic” period for both sides had come to an end. Heroic, because it was characterized by many very hard fights. - This era led to numerous Tuareg poems and songs, but also to French novels and films in which their heroes went down in history. - Sheikh Amoud had retreated to Libya. He had given up his possessions in Djanet. He now lived near Ubari, where he owned gardens, and died there in 1927.

Amoud's goal during these years was to prevent the colonization of the Tuareg by the French. The reasons for his failure were that the northern Tuareg had been weakened by internal fighting in recent decades, as well as by years of drought (from 1911) and locust swarms (1914), each followed by famine. Another reason was that the leaders of the northern Tuareg ethnic groups, including those of the Kel Ajjer, could not decide on a common approach. The French thus succeeded by applying the principle of divide and rule.

== See also ==
- Kel Adagh
- Kel Ahaggar
- Kel Ayr
- Kel Gres
- Aulliminden: Kel Ataram (west) and Kel Dinnik (east)
- Paul Flatters: About the Flatters Expeditions
