= Kel Gres =

Kel Gres is a tribal confederation of Tuareg clans (or "Drum-groups"). In the modern era, they have mostly lived in south central Niger, although they are known to have inhabited the Aïr Mountains prior to the 17th century. As pastoralists, the Kel Gress also have a tradition seasonal transhumance cycle which takes them far from their more settled communities in the Zinder and Tahoua Regions.

== See also ==
- Tuareg
  - Kel Adagh
  - Kel Ahaggar
  - Kel Ajjer
  - Kel Ayr
  - Kel Owey
  - Aulliminden: Kel Ataram (west) and Kel Dinnik (east)
