= Kel Adagh =

Confederation of clans

The Kel Adagh (var. Kel Adrar, Kel Adghagh, less commonly Kel Ifoghas) are a Tuareg confederation of clans (or "Drum-Groups") living in the region of the Adrar des Iforas highlands in Mali. The name comes from Tamasheq "Kel" ("those from/of") and "Adagh" ("Mountains"). In the modern era, not all Tuareg in the Adrar des Iforas are Kel Adagh, while some Kel Adagh are spread through northern Niger and southern Algeria, with populations in the Aïr Mountains, Tassili n'Ajjer, and the Hoggar Mountains. Most Kel Adagh derive from Noble and Warrior castes and their tributaries.

Noble Kel Adagh in Ifoghas include:

- Kel Afella (North) : tributaries of the Amenokal of Adagh.
- Kel Taghlit
- Kel Essouk (Religious caste tributary group)
- Kel Ouzzeyn
- Ifergoumessen
- Iriyaken

Tributaries include around forty tribes, the more notable of which are :

- Taghat Mellet ("Those of the white horse")
- Idnan
- Ibatanaten

== 2012 Tuareg rebellion ==
In the months leading up to the 2012 Tuareg rebellion, the Islamist Iyad ag Ghaly reportedly attempted to take on the leadership of Kel Adagh, but was rejected. He responded by founding the Islamist group Ansar Dine.

In early 2012, the Tuareg fighters of the National Movement for the Liberation of Azawad (MNLA) took control of several towns in northern Mali. The gains triggered a coup in Mali by mutinying soldiers, allowing the MNLA to take the regional capitals of Kidal, Gao, and Timbuktu. TIME describes Kel Adagh as "the Tuareg group most closely aligned with the rebellion".

== See also ==
- Kel Tamasheq
  - Kel Ahaggar
  - Kel Ajjer
  - Kel Ayr
  - Kel Gres
  - Iwellemmedan : Kel Ataram (west) and Kel Dinnik (east)
