= Kel Ahaggar =

Tuareg confederation in Algeria

- 200s–1977
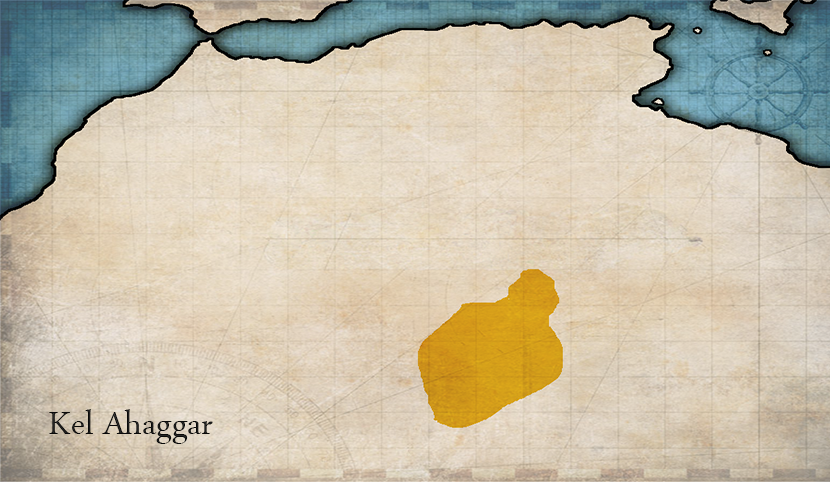
- Kel Ahaggar Tuareg confederation Map
- Status: Tuareg confederation
- Capital: Hoggar Mountains, Algeria
- Common languages: Tamahaq language
- Religion: Islam
- Government: Tribal Confederacy
- Amenokal
  - N/A: Tin Hinan
  - 1905–1920: Moussa Ag Amastan
- History
  - Kel Ahaggar established: 200s
  - Under French suzerainty: 1903
  - Not recognized by independent Algeria: 1962
  - Terminated by Algerian Government: 1977
- ISO 3166 code: DZ
Preceded by	Succeeded by
Berbers	French Algeria; Algeria
- Today part of: Algeria

Kel Ahaggar was a Tuareg confederation inhabiting the Hoggar Mountains in Algeria. The language of the confederation was Tamahaq.

== History ==
The Kel Ahaggar were originally known as the Hawwara, and inhabited the Aurès Mountains. They were followers of Nukkari Ibadism, and participated in the revolt of Abu Yazid against the Fatimids. They were defeated in 947, and a portion of the tribe fled to the desert.

== Popular culture ==
- A novel about the 1881 attempt by the French government to drive a railroad through the heart of the Sahara, including the Ahaggar region. The expedition, led by Lt. Colonel Paul Flatters, was attacked by the Tuareg of the Kel Ahaggar.
- The 1957 film Legend of the Lost, starring John Wayne, Rossano Brazzi and Sophia Loren, has the trio on a treasure hunt in the Sahara. They come across a nomadic group which Wayne's character, Joe January, states are "Hoggars", and to be much feared.

== See also ==
- Tuareg people
  - Kel Adagh
  - Kel Ajjer
  - Kel Ayr
  - Kel Gres
  - Iwellemmedan people: Kel Ataram (west) and Kel Dinnik (east)
