= Amenukal =

Tuareg paramount confederation leader

Amenukal (Berber: ⵎⵏⴾⵍ, ⴰⵎⵏⵓⴽⴰⵍ) is a title for the highest Tuareg traditional chiefs; he is the head of an "ettebel" (drums, command...) and chosen from among the few relatives of the deceased amenokal. The term amenokal means "supreme chief, king, emperor". · European observers have proposed several words to describe the scope of an amenokal's command (ettebel): confederation, political grouping, or "drum groups".

== History ==
Prior to the colonial period in the Maghreb and Sahel, the nomadic Tuareg federations chose a chief from among the wise men of their tribes to rule these confederacies.

- In what is now Algeria, an Amenokal was at the head of the Kel Ahaggar Tuareg confederation since its establishment (c. 1750). It was maintained under colonial French suzerainty since 1903 but no longer recognized after the Algerian independence. It was finally abolished in 1977.
- In the northern mountains of what is now Niger, in the early 15th century, a state called Aïr was founded by the Tuareg confederation there, under an amenokal, who was also designated by the Arabic Muslim title Sultan; hence, it is also called a Berber sultanate.

According to tradition, the first Tuareg chief was a woman, Tin Hinan, the founder of the Ahaggar community. Her monumental tomb is located at Abalessa in the Hoggar region.

At the beginning of the 20th century, before colonization, the Iwellemmeden Kel Ataram confederation still controlled a vast territory, stretching across the entire western part of the Tuareg country from the Kidal-Menaka line to Lake Faguibine. This vast political center, a veritable empire, is sometimes referred to by the name of its leaders, the Iwellemmeden, and sometimes (particularly by the eastern Tuareg) by the name Tademmekat, a term encompassing the entire political entity. This entity was structured as a confederation. Its structure granted each unit within the whole a degree of autonomy, thus allowing for the coexistence of different models of governance for people and property. Political divisions were compounded by economic specializations and often also by linguistic, social, or cultural disparities.

== Sources and references ==
- Ilahiane, Historical Dictionary of the Berbers (Imazighen), The Scarecrow Press, Inc.
- WorldStatesmen article on Niger
