= Djado =

Ghost town in Niger

Coordinates: 21°00′57″N 12°18′30″E

Djado is a commune and ghost town located in the department of Bilma in Niger. The settlement lies on the plateau with the same name. The local name of the abandoned city is Brao.

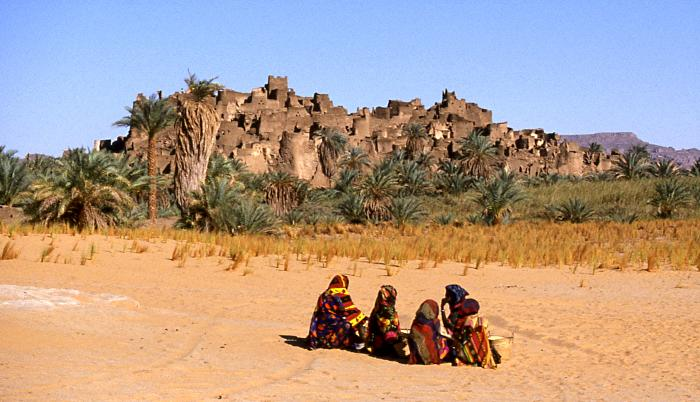
The ruined city of Djado, with nomadic women gathered in the foreground. October 1989.

== Geography ==
The former Djado is located in an oasis, in the northeastern part of Ténéré Desert. The Ténéré Desert is considered part of the Sahara Desert. It is located on the southeastern end of the Djado plateau. For the administration, there's also a modern-day commune called Djado. The modern-day commune also comprises the Menfueni plateau and the Thchigai plateau. Modern-day Djado is the northernmost and easternmost commune in Niger. To the north, it borders Algeria and Libya, to the east, it lies on the border to Chad. Neighboring communes in Niger are Dirkou to the south, Fachi to the southeast, and Iférouane to the west.

There are three villages in the commune: Chirfa, Séguédine, and Yaba. In addition, there are the nomad camps of Djado and Tchounouk, as well as military camps. The main settlement is the village Chirfa.

The ruins of Djado are on top of rocky cliffs. At the bottom of these cliffs are subterranean ponds, which also serve as an ideal breeding ground for mosquitoes. Depending on the season, some of these ponds almost dry up completely. From the cliffs, the Kaouar valley can be reached. There is a desert made of pebbles to the west. Beyond them lie the Aïr Mountains.

== History ==
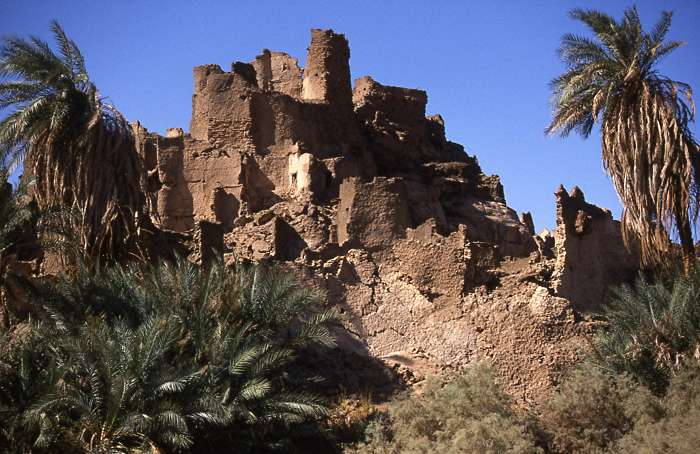
Ruins of buildings built of mud.

According to the tradition of the local Kanuri, the Sao people founded Djado. It may also have been founded by Ibadi merchants from Jadu, an important trade town in Jabal Nafusa, southwest of Tripoli, and given the name of their hometown.

Djado was part of the kingdom of Sayfema of Kanem-Bornu at least since the reign of Dunama Dibalemi (1203–1243). For part of the time, they were independent, but they re-joined the empire of Idris Alauma (1564–1596). Idris Alauma moved through the desert, from Fachi to Bilma, 260 kilometres (160 mi) south of Djado.

As the power of the Bomu empire decreased, the people of the oasis were exposed to several raids of the Touareg, in the 18th and 19th century. They started to leave the place, and settled in Kaouar. Another reason might be that cattle herding in the region also introduced mosquitoes that spread malaria. In 1860, about 1000 Kanuri are said to have been left. In the middle of the 20th century, only a few Kanuri and Toubou were left. They mostly lived from growing dates, and harvesting salt.

In 1988 the Dakar Rally passed through Djado.

== World Heritage Status ==
This site was added to the UNESCO World Heritage Tentative List on May 26, 2006, in the Cultural category due to its universal cultural significance.

== Population ==
In 2012, 876 people lived in the commune, in 168 households. In 2001, there were 936 people in 202 households.

In the main village, there were 208 people in 63 households, in the 2012 census; In 2001, there were 208 people in 45 households, and in 1998, 260 people in 74 households.

When it comes to harvesting, there are Tubu the area near the ghost town. In the eastern part of the commune, Tedaga and Libyan Arabic are spoken. On the Algerian border, Tahaggart, a Tuareg language, is common. Historically the people were sessile, but the current population of the region is mostly nomadic.

== Books ==
- Die geomorphologische Entwicklung des westlichen Murzuk-Beckens, des Djado-Plateaus und des nördlichen Kaouar (Zentrale Sahara). Universität Würzburg. 1982.
- Nomades noirs du Sahara. Recherches en sciences humaines. Plon. 1957.
- Bonjour le Sahara du Niger: Aïr, Ténéré, Kawar, Djado. Guide pour voyageurs curieux. Les Créations du pélican. 1994. ISBN 2-9036-9639-X.
- Le Djado: carrefour de la préhistoire saharienne. Université Paris 1 Panthéon-Sorbonne. 1974.
- Die Zitadelle der vergessenen Christen. 1992. pp. 157–182.
- Etude de la flore à lycophytes du carbonifère inférieur du Djado (Sahara Oriental). Université de Paris. 1966.
- Das Djado-Plateau (Niger) und die Felsbilder seiner Enneris. Beier & Beran. 2013. ISBN 978-3-941171-97-8.
- Préhistoire du Djado. Le paléolithique moyen de Yat. Faculté des Lettres et Sciences Humaines, Université de Niamey. 1991.
- Contribution à la connaissance du Nord-Est nigérien: les aspects sociaux et politiques de l’histoire du Kawar, Jado et l'Agram au 19e siècle. Université de Niamey. 1989.
- A Sudanic Chronicle: the Borno Expeditions of Idris Alauma (1564–1576). Steiner. 1987. ISBN 978-3-515-04926-9.
- Le style de Tazina: définition, extension, signification de ses figurations les plus méridionales (Fezzan, Tassili, Djado, Aïr). 1988. pp. 179–201.
- Une oasis au Niger. Le Djado. L’Harmattan. 1999. ISBN 2-7384-7860-3.
- Sedimentologische Untersuchungen an Verfüllungen von Silikatkarstformen im Djado und an der Stufe von Bilma (NE-Niger) (PDF). Vol. Bd. 24. 1990. pp. 6–9.
