= Erg of Bilma =

Coordinates: 18°11′42″N 14°00′00″E

- Erg
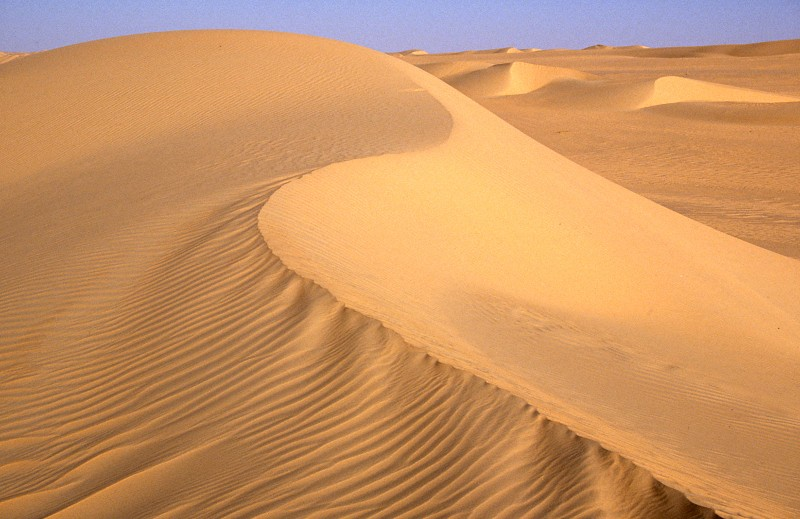
- Landscape of dunes in the Erg of Bilma.

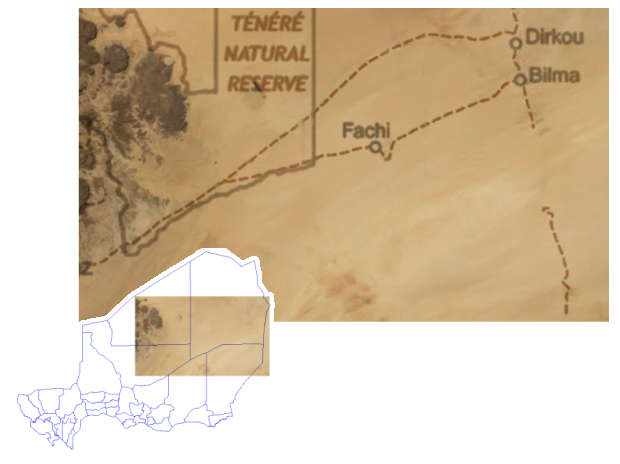
- Location of the Erg of Bilma.
- Country: Niger
- Elevation: 4,400 m (14,400 ft)

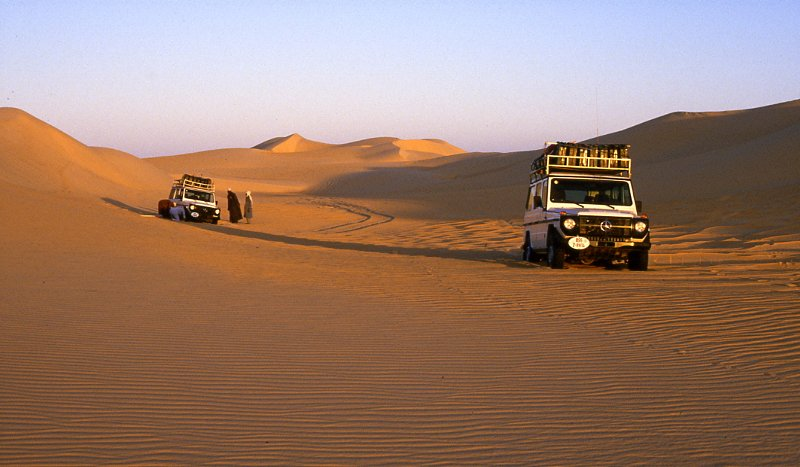
Modern Tourism in the Erg.

The Erg of Bilma is a dune sea (Arabic: erg) in the Ténéré desert region of south central Sahara Desert. The Erg of Bilma stretches southwest from Fachi and the Tibesti Mountains. On the west it is bounded by the Aïr Mountains in north central Niger, and to the east it passes Bilma, continuing on to the Chadian border. It surrounds on three sides the oasis of Bilma, southernmost of a north–south string of oases of the Kaouar rise. The Erg covers an area of approximately 455,000 square kilometres (176,000 mi^{2}).

At its southernmost edge, some of the dunes have been stabilized by the growth of vegetation, allowing human cultivation of crops like millet and sorghum on the slopes.

== History ==
The ancient Bornu Empire to Fezzan caravan routes had to cross the dunes of the erg south of Bilma as the last major obstacle before reaching the sahel. While that traffic largely ceased after 1820, trade through the erg of Bilma continues from the Lake Chad region and the Termit Massif on a small scale.

== See also ==
- List of ergs
