= Achénouma =

Achénouma أشينوما
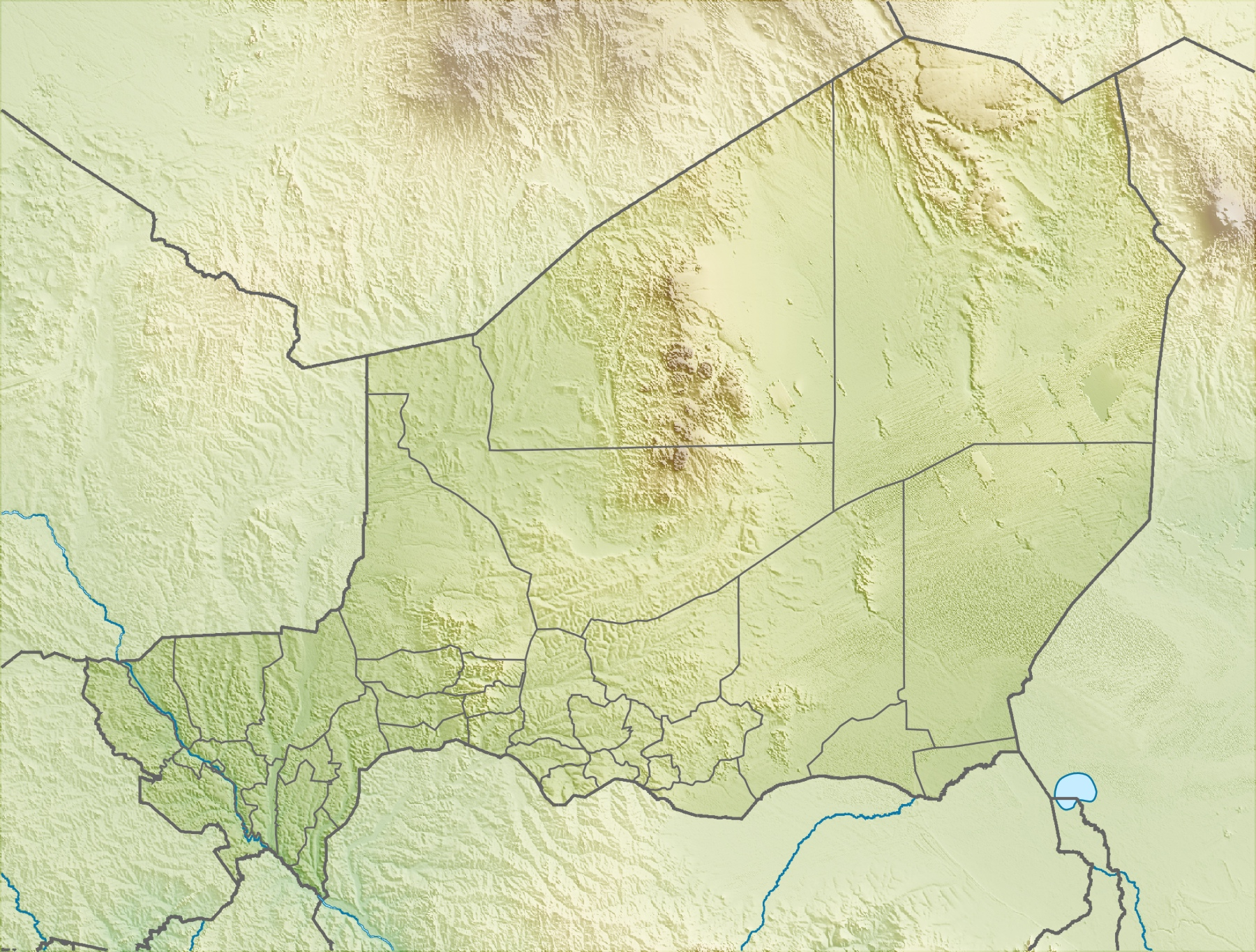
- Location within Niger
- Coordinates: 19°7′39.1″N 12°55′20.3″E
- Country: Niger
- Region: Agadez Region
- Department: Bilma Department
- Commune: Dirkou

Population (2012)
  - Total: 581
- Time zone: UTC+1 (WAT)

Achénouma, also spelled Achinouma, is an administrative village located in Agadez Region, Niger. Achénouma is not one of Niger's 255 communes, and is geographically located within the commune of Dirkou.

== Geography ==
Achénouma is located along the Kaouar escarpment, which is the location of multiple oases leading to an "island of civilization" in the Sahara Desert. The town is located approximately 15 kilometres north of Dirkou, near the mountain Tima. The mountain has served as a fortified refuge, and has also been known as Ayyama. The village's saltworks, called Ayemma, can be found four kilometres from Tima. Salt and soda ash production are an important part of the local economy.

== Inhabitants ==
Achénouma is largely inhabited by former slaves of the Teda ethnic group.

== Climate ==
Achénouma has an arid climate, or BWh under the Köppen climate classification.

Climate data for Achénouma
Month	Jan	Feb	Mar	Apr	May	Jun	Jul	Aug	Sep	Oct	Nov	Dec	Year
Record high °C (°F)	37.52 (99.54)	39.49 (103.08)	41.47 (106.65)	44.43 (111.97)	44.43 (111.97)	44.43 (111.97)	45.42 (113.76)	42.45 (108.41)	43.44 (110.19)	42.45 (108.41)	37.52 (99.54)	34.56 (94.21)	45.42 (113.76)
Mean daily maximum °C (°F)	27.85 (82.13)	31.5 (88.7)	35.56 (96.01)	39.02 (102.24)	40.82 (105.48)	40.42 (104.76)	38.28 (100.90)	36.88 (98.38)	38.23 (100.81)	36.74 (98.13)	32.7 (90.9)	28.3 (82.9)	35.53 (95.95)
Daily mean °C (°F)	22.34 (72.21)	25.79 (78.42)	30.01 (86.02)	33.9 (93.0)	36.48 (97.66)	36.69 (98.04)	35.06 (95.11)	33.82 (92.88)	35.08 (95.14)	28.32 (82.98)	28.32 (82.98)	23.45 (74.21)	30.77 (87.39)
Mean daily minimum °C (°F)	14.41 (57.94)	17.35 (63.23)	21.22 (70.20)	25.24 (77.43)	28.35 (83.03)	30.03 (86.05)	29.75 (85.55)	29.08 (84.34)	29.75 (85.55)	26.71 (80.08)	21.47 (70.65)	16.39 (61.50)	24.15 (75.46)
Record low °C (°F)	6.91 (44.44)	8.89 (48.00)	11.85 (53.33)	16.78 (62.20)	20.73 (69.31)	22.71 (72.88)	22.71 (72.88)	22.71 (72.88)	24.68 (76.42)	15.8 (60.4)	15.8 (60.4)	7.9 (46.2)	6.91 (44.44)
Average precipitation mm (inches)	0 (0)	0.22 (0.01)	0.88 (0.03)	3.4 (0.13)	3.06 (0.12)	30.15 (1.19)	53.63 (2.11)	74.03 (2.91)	15.81 (0.62)	1.54 (0.06)	0 (0)	0.05 (0.00)	182.77 (7.18)
Average rainy days	0	0.09	0.27	0.99	0.9	3.5	6.82	10.42	2.15	0.63	0	0	25.77
Average relative humidity (%)	15.51	12.91	10.8	10.32	12.99	18.82	28.15	34.64	21.43	14.41	15.03	17.7	17.73
Source: Tcktcktck
