= Azalai =

Sahara desert caravan route

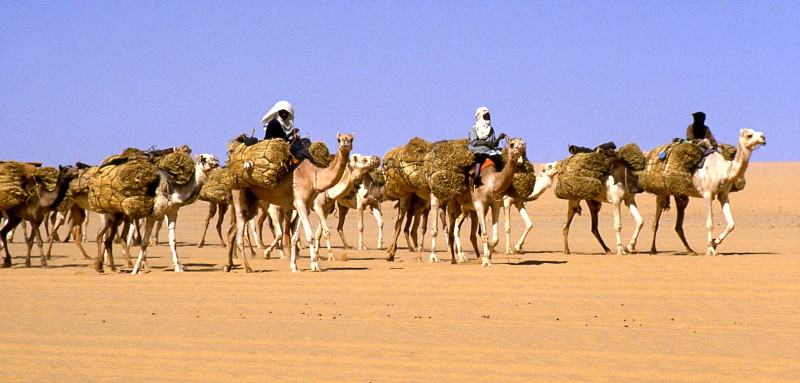
A camel train traveling from Agadez to Bilma (Niger), 1985.

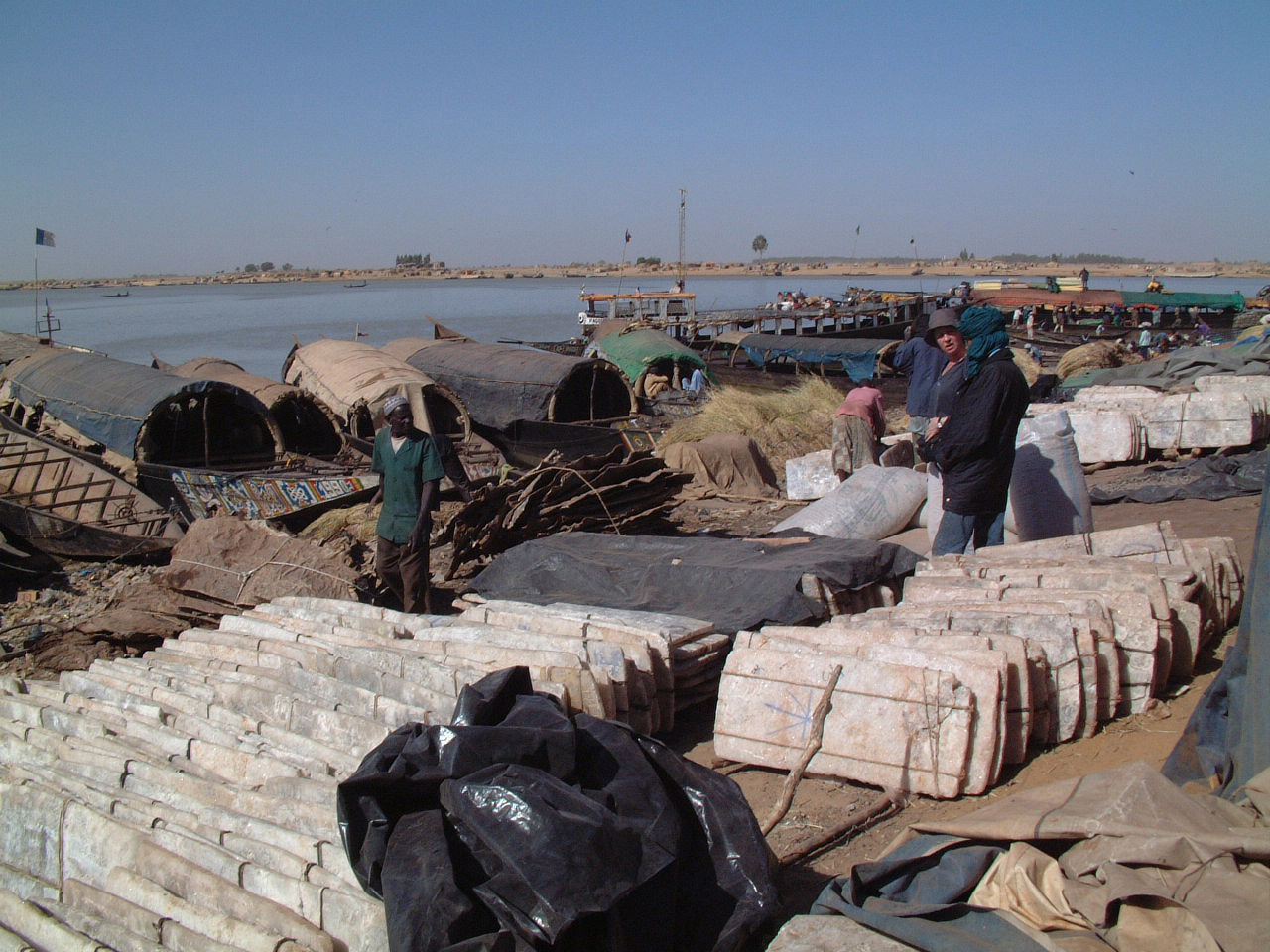
Slabs of salt from the mines of Taoudenni stacked on the quayside at the port of Mopti (Mali)

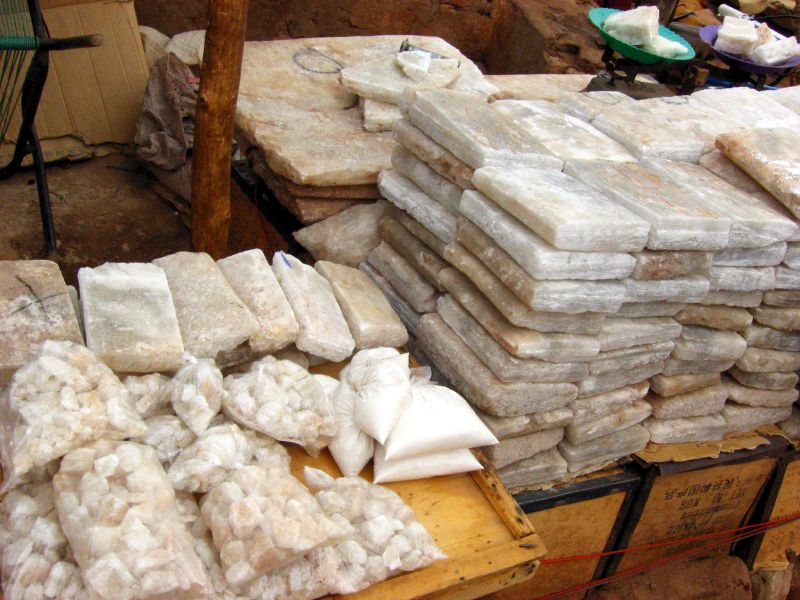
Rock salt at the market in Mopti. It is sold here in slabs, broken and weighed, and packaged into smaller amounts.

The Azalai (Tamasheq, var. Azalay) is a semi-annual salt caravan route practiced by Tuareg traders in the Sahara desert between Timbuktu and the Taoudenni salt mine in Mali, or the act of traveling with a caravan along that route.

The other major West African salt caravan route, heading from around Agadez to Fachi and Bilma in Niger, is called Taghlamt (in Tamasheq, or Taglem or Tagalem in Hausa language).

The two are among the last caravan routes in the Sahara that are still in use. Both caravans have largely been replaced by unpaved truck routes.

== Timbuktu-Taoudenni ==
At one time the caravan route from Timbuktu extended through Taoudenni to Taghaza, another salt-mining site, and on to the lands north of the Sahara on the Mediterranean Sea. Caravans with up to 10,000 camels carried gold and slaves north, returning with manufactured goods and salt from Taghaza and Taoudenni. Until the 1940s, the Taoudenni caravans were made up of thousands of camels, departing Timbuktu at the beginning of the cool season in November, with a smaller caravan departing Timbuktu at the beginning of the hot season in March.

After the Azalai reaches Timbuktu, the rock salt it is taken by boat to Mopti and further on to other Sahel and Sudanian markets.

== Agadez–Bilma ==
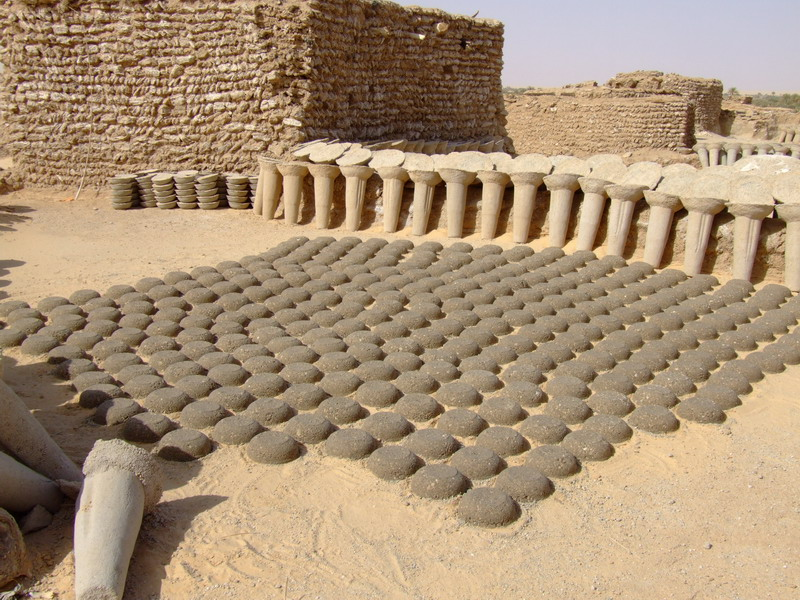
beza (front) and kantu salt in Fachi

The Agadez–Bilma route, passing through the Ténéré desert and the oasis town of Fachi in eastern Niger, takes around three weeks to complete (both ways). It is traditionally a twice yearly caravan from the capital of the Aïr region to the natron salt pans along the string of oases formed by the Kaouar cliffs in north east Niger. Food and supplies were carried from Agadez each November and March and traded for bricks of salt, condensed in the natron pits of oasis towns, and to a lesser extent, dates and vegetables. The salt was then generally traded for animal use in the Hausaland regions to the south.

The Agadez–Bilma Taghlamt was historically a monopoly of the Tuareg, and successively the Kel Gres, Kel Owey and Kel Ayr confederations in particular. Many Tuareg traders owned the salt pits and date plantations in Kaouar, as well as holding bonded laborers there, and traveled the caravan to administer their property. The Tuareg Taghlamt, numbering 10,000 camels and stretching 25 km at the beginning of the colonial period, is led by the representative of the Amenukal (confederation leader), followed by each sub group.

=== Pre-colonial history ===
The camel was introduced into the Sahara in the late first millennium, and Tuareg tribes moved south into the region in the 13th century. In the 18th century, Tuareg confederations captured the Kaouar oases from the Kanem–Bornu Empire and began transporting goods from Agadez.

=== Colonial and post-colonial history ===
The disruptions of the French colonial expansion in the first years of the 20th century led to inter clan rivalries, and later, the rise of mechanised traffic. In 1904, Ouled Sliman raiders from what is now Chad destroyed the caravan at Bilma, and again in 1906 at Fachi. The French reported that the 1906 caravan numbered 20,000 camels. Following the Kaocen revolt, no Taghlamt traveled the route until 1925, and then it was accompanied by French colonial forces. By 1948, the caravans had shrunk to 8000 camels, and continued to shrink thereafter. The northern road route, marked by the Tree of Ténéré, has supplanted most camel trains, but small Taghlamt trains continue to head out each November.

== See also ==
- Trans-Saharan trade
