= Tree of Ténéré =

Solitary acacia in Ténéré, northeast Niger

Coordinates: 17°44′39″N 10°4′58″E

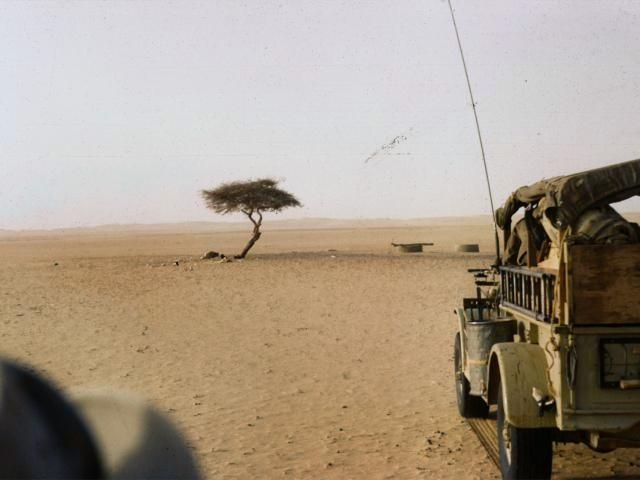
Tree of Ténéré (1961)

Original location of the Ténéré Tree in Niger

The Tree of Ténéré (French: L'Arbre du Ténéré) was a solitary acacia (Vachellia tortilis subsp. raddiana) that was once considered the most isolated tree on Earth. It was a landmark on caravan routes through the Ténéré region of the Sahara Desert in northeast Niger, so well known that it and the Arbre Perdu (Lost Tree) to the north are the only trees to be shown on a map at a scale of 1:4,000,000. The tree is estimated to have existed for approximately 300 years until it was knocked down in 1973 by an allegedly drunk Libyan truck driver.

== Background ==
The Tree of Ténéré was the last of a group of trees that grew along the Azalai when the Sahara desert was less parched than it is today. The tree had stood alone for decades. During the winter of 1938–1939, a well was dug near the tree and it was found that the roots of the tree reached the water table 33–36 meters (108–118 feet) below the surface.

Commander of the Allied Military Mission Michel Lesourd, of the Service central des affaires sahariennes [Central service of Saharan affairs], saw the tree on May 21, 1939:

One must see the Tree to believe its existence. What is its secret? How can it still be living in spite of the multitudes of camels which trample at its sides. How at each azalai does not a lost camel eat its leaves and thorns? Why don't the numerous Touareg leading the salt caravans cut its branches to make fires to brew their tea? The only answer is that the tree is taboo and considered as such by the caravaniers. There is a kind of superstition, a tribal order which is always respected. Each year the azalai gather round the Tree before facing the crossing of the Ténéré. The Acacia has become a living lighthouse; it is the first or the last landmark for the azalai leaving Agadez for Bilma, or returning.

The French ethnologist and explorer Henri Lhote described his two journeys to the Tree of Ténéré in his book L'épopée du Ténéré. His first visit was in 1934 on the occasion of the first automobile crossing between Djanet and Agadez. He describes the tree as "an Acacia with a degenerative trunk, sick or ill in aspect. Nevertheless, the tree has nice green leaves, and some yellow flowers". He visited it again 25 years later, on November 26, 1959, with the Berliet-Ténéré mission, but found that it had been badly damaged after a vehicle had collided with it:

Before, this tree was green and with flowers; now it is a colourless thorn tree and naked. I cannot recognise it—it had two very distinct trunks. Now there is only one, with a stump on the side, slashed, rather than cut a metre from the soil. What has happened to this unhappy tree? Simply, a lorry going to Bilma has struck it... but it has enough space to avoid it... the taboo, sacred tree, the one which no nomad here would have dared to have hurt with his hand... this tree has been the victim of a mechanic...

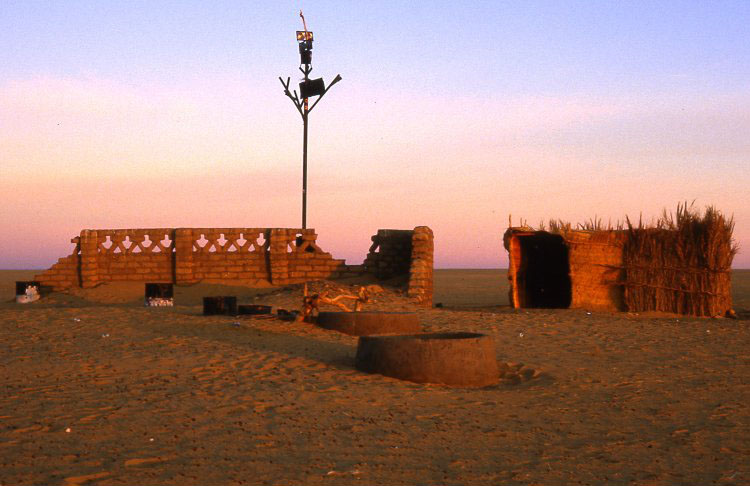
Metal sculpture of the tree (1985)

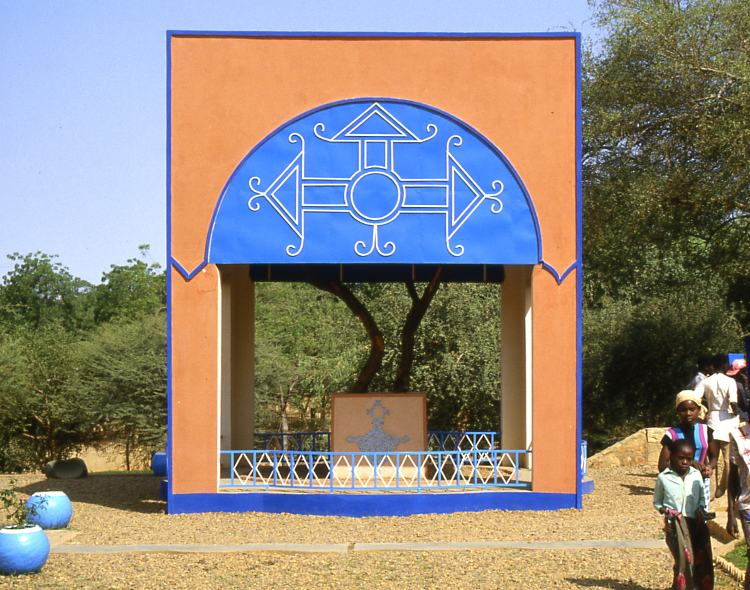
The pavilion housing the tree's remains in Niamey

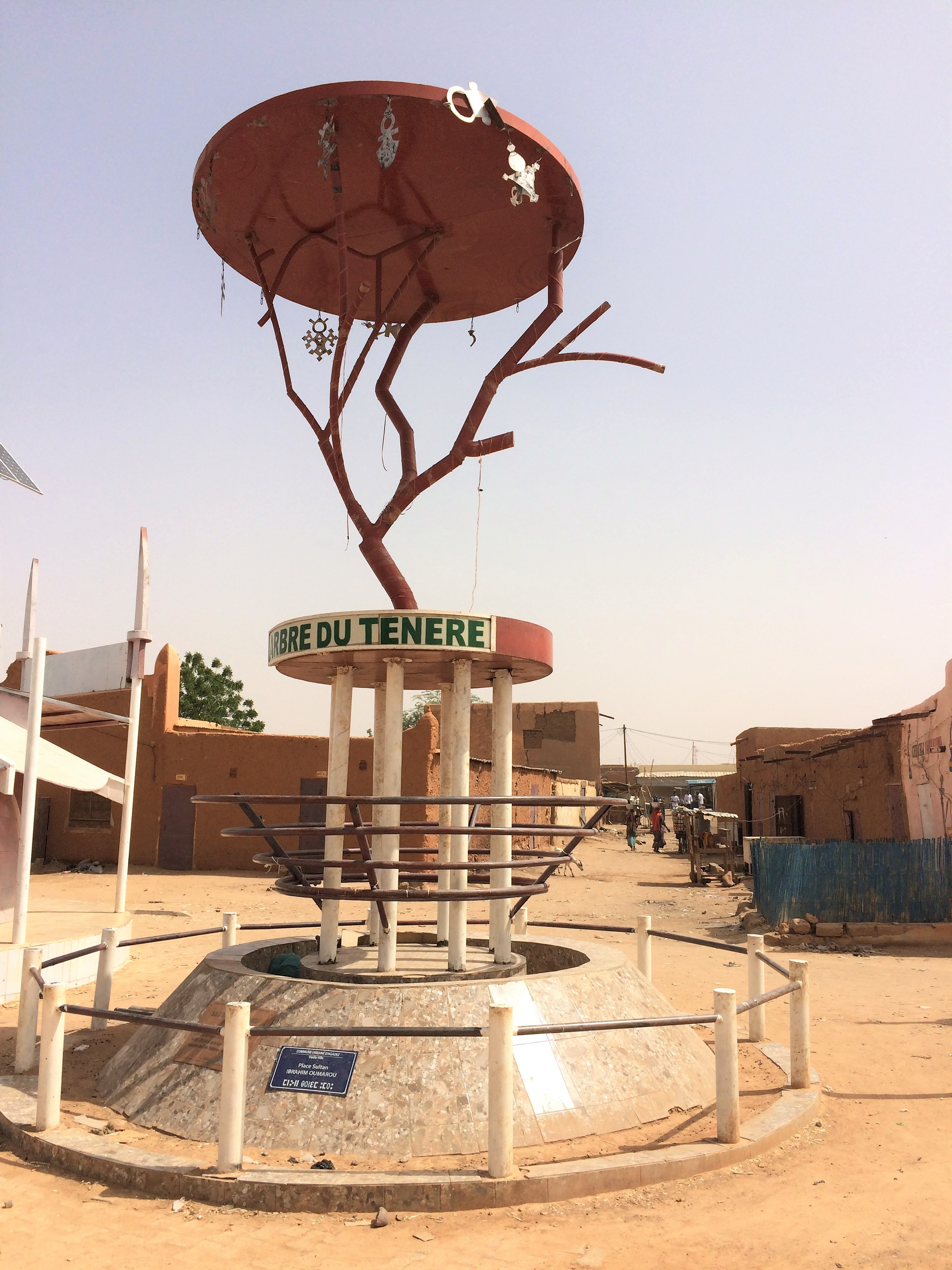
Replica in Agadez

== Death and monument ==
The Tree of Ténéré was knocked down by a Libyan truck driver, reportedly drunk, in 1973. On November 8, 1973, the dead tree was installed in a dedicated shrine on the grounds of the Niger National Museum in Niamey.

A simple metal sculpture representing the tree stands to mark its former location and general appearance in the desert. Another replica – which better resembles the original tree – stands in the historic centre of Agadez (see image).

== In popular culture ==
The sculpture representing the Tree of Ténéré and the Tree's story feature prominently in the 2006 film La Gran final (The Great Match). In the film, a group of Tuareg nomads in the Sahara race to find a power supply and broadcast reception for their television in time to watch the 2002 FIFA World Cup Final between Germany and Brazil, eventually using the tree sculpture as a makeshift antenna.

In 2017, a group of artists created a massive, four-story tall LED sculpture entitled Tree of Tenere that was showcased at Burning Man. The sculpture consisted of 25,000 molded leaves containing 175,000 LEDs. In 2021 the artists re-developed the sculpture and created a permanent installation in the Deep Ellum neighborhood of Dallas, Texas.

In 2018, the tree's story appeared as a main theme in the official music video of "Transmission/Michaelion" by Ibeyi.

== See also ==
- Dry tree
- List of individual trees
