= Thierry Sabine =

French racing driver and race organizer

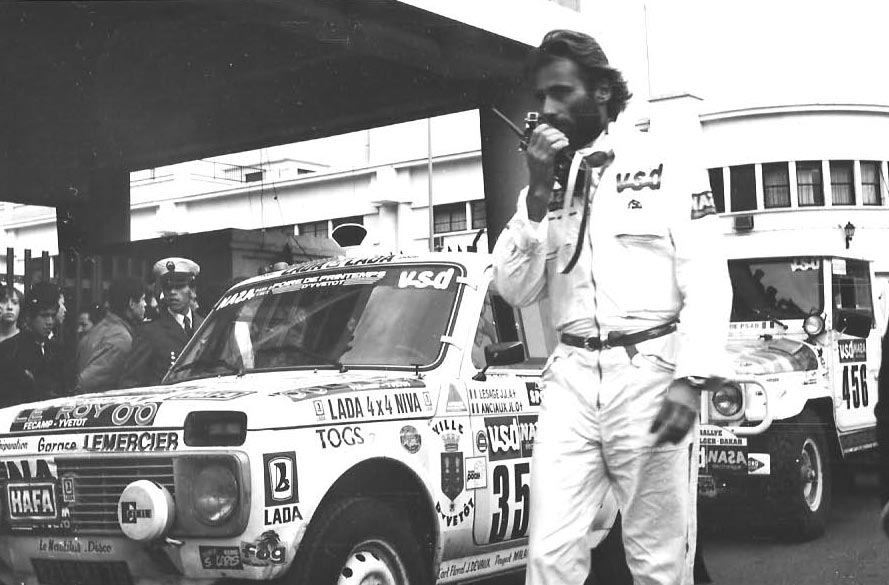
- Sabine during the 1986 Paris-Alger-Dakar rally, on 4 January.
- Born: 13 June 1949; Neuilly-sur-Seine, Hauts-de-Seine, France
- Died: 14 January 1986 (aged 36); Gourma-Rharous, Mali

Thierry Sabine (13 June 1949, Neuilly-sur-Seine – 14 January 1986, Mali) was a French wrangler, motorcycle racer and founder and main organizer of the Dakar Rally.

== Career ==
In 1977, Sabine got lost on the Tchigai Plateau, near the isolated mountain of Emi Fezzan during the Abidjan-Nice Race, and realized that the desert would be a good location for a rally where amateurs could test their ability. In December 1977, he established a race from Paris to Dakar and devoted the rest of his life to its organization. His motto for the Dakar Rally was, "A challenge for those who go. A dream for those who stay behind."

Sabine was noted for the care he took over the competitors, which was exemplified during the 1983 running of the event. That year, the route crossed the as-yet-unexplored Ténéré region of the Sahara and 40 competitors became lost when a sandstorm struck. He spent four days flying over the region and was able to direct all lost competitors toward the correct route. Nicole Maitrot, a competitor the previous year, said of him:

"One has the impression that Thierry Sabine is God looking over his sheep from up in his helicopter, coming down in a swirl of airplane to help those who are lost."

Sabine was killed when his Ecureuil helicopter crashed into a dune at Mali during a sudden sandstorm at 7:30 p.m. on Tuesday 14 January 1986. Also killed onboard was the singer-songwriter Daniel Balavoine, helicopter pilot François-Xavier Bagnoud, journalist Nathalie Odent and Jean-Paul Lefur who was a radiophonic engineer for RTL. Sabine's ashes were later scattered at the Lost Tree in Niger, which the rally thereafter described as the "Arbre Thierry Sabine".

Sabine was featured in the movie A Man and a Woman: 20 Years Later released in 1986.

== Racing record ==
=== Complete 24 Hours of Le Mans results ===
| Year | Team | Co-Drivers | Car | Class | Laps | Pos. | Class Pos. |
|---|---|---|---|---|---|---|---|
| 1975 | (France) P. Dagoreau (private entrant) | (France) Philippe Dagoreau (Switzerland) Jean-Pierre Aeschlimann | Porsche 911 Carrera RS | GT | 285 | 17th | 3rd |
| 1976 | (France) ASA Cachia | (France) Philippe Dagoreau (France) Jean-Claude Andruet | Porsche 911 Carrera RSR | Gr.5; SP | 288 | 13th | 6th |
| 1977 | (France) L. Meznarie (private entrant) | (France) Jean Bélin | Porsche 911 Carrera RSR | Gr.5; SP | – | DNQ | |

=== Complete Tour de France Automobile results ===
| Year | Team | Co-Drivers | Car | Class | Pos. | Class Pos. |
|---|---|---|---|---|---|---|
| 1971 | Ford-France | (France) Frédéric Bonnard | Ford Capri 2600 | T3.0 | | DNF |
| 1972 | (France) T. Sabine (private entrant) | (France) "Bedin" | Porsche 911 S | Gr.3 +2.0 | | DNF |
| 1973 | | (France) Jean Delannoy | Porsche 911 Carrera RS | Gr.3 | 4th | 2nd |
