= Dirkou =

Dirkou Dirki
- Commune
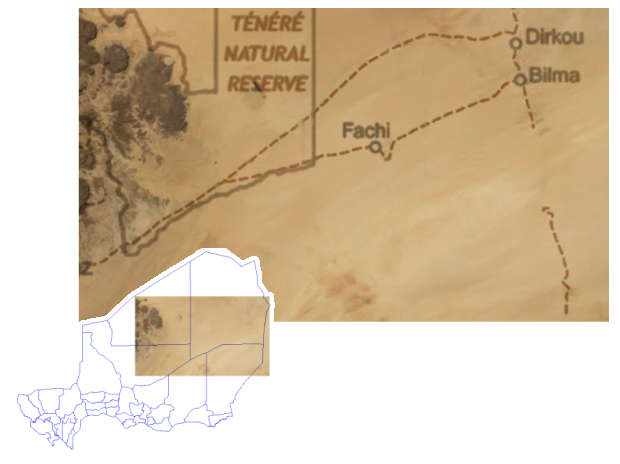

- Location in Niger
- Coordinates: 19°2′0″N 12°54′12″E
- Country: Niger
- Region: Agadez Region
- Department: Bilma Department
- Commune: Dirkou
- Elevation: 1,598 ft (487 m)

Population (2011)
  - Total: 14,998
- Time zone: UTC+1 (WAT)

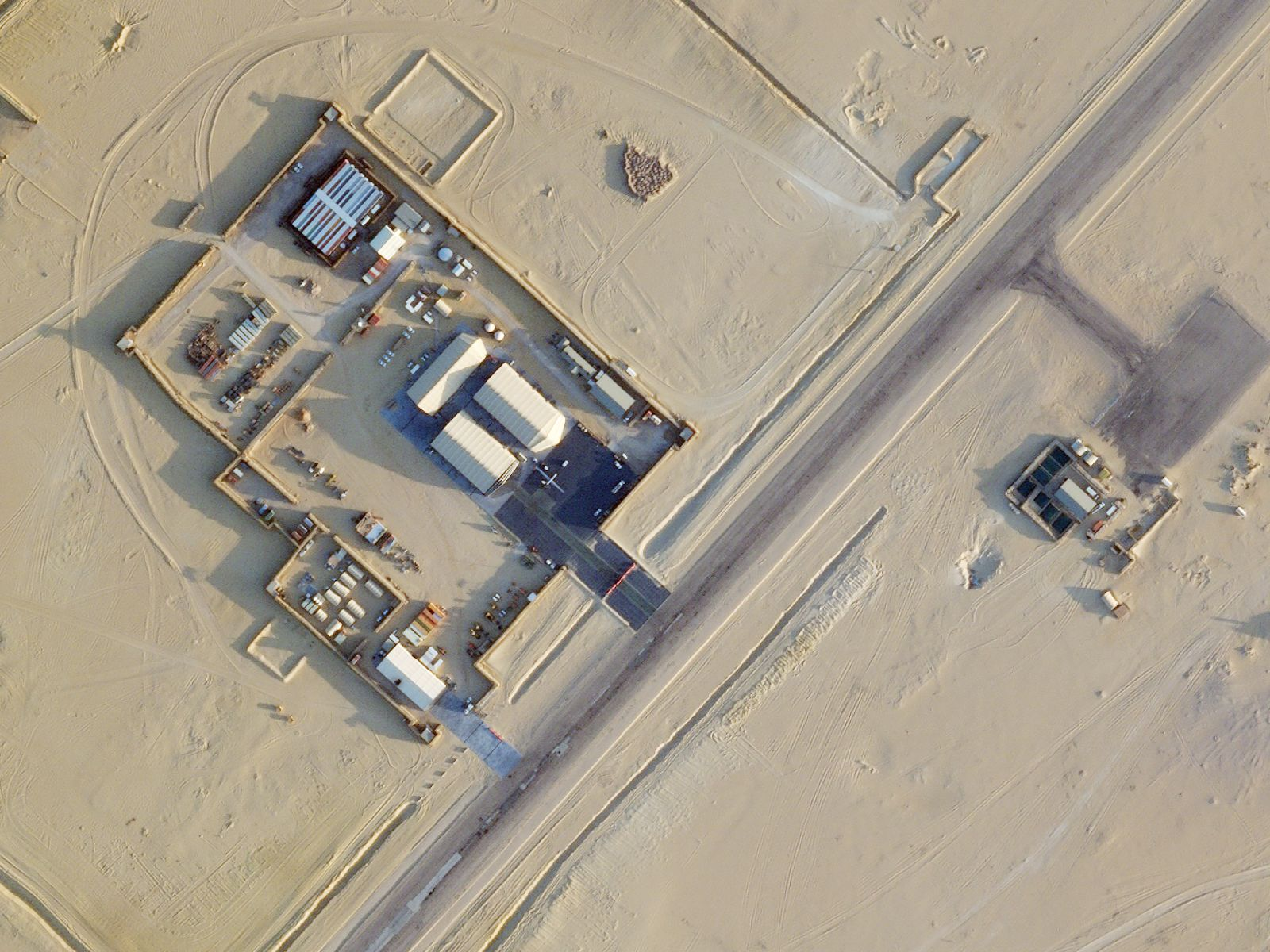
Dirkou Airport, 2021.

Dirkou is a town in the Bilma Department, Agadez Region of north-eastern Niger. It lies in the northern Kaouar escarpment, a north–south line of cliffs which form an isolated oasis in the Sahara desert. As of 2011, the commune had a total population of 14,998 people. Apart from the main city of Dirkou, the rural communities of Achénouma, Aney, and Emi Tchouma lie within the borders of the commune.

The town is just south of Séguédine, and around 90 km north of Departmental capital Bilma. While isolated in modern Niger, it once lay on the important central soudan route of the Trans-Saharan trade which linked coastal Libya and the Fezzan to the Kanem–Bornu Empire near Lake Chad. Its population is made up primarily of traditionally sedentary Kanuri people, as well as semi-nomadic Tuareg and Toubou people.

The Central Intelligence Agency operates an armed drone base near Dirkou, targeting Islamic State militants in southern Libya.

== Transport ==
The town is served by Dirkou Airport. It is on the route some migrants have taken from Niger to Libya.
