= Al-Kanemi =

Al-Kanemi is a surname. Notable people with the surname include:

- Abu Ishaq Ibrahim al-Kanemi (died c. 1212), Arabic poet
- Muhammad al-Amin al-Kanemi (1776–1837), Muslim ruler of Borno
