= Fachi =

Fachi Agram
- Commune
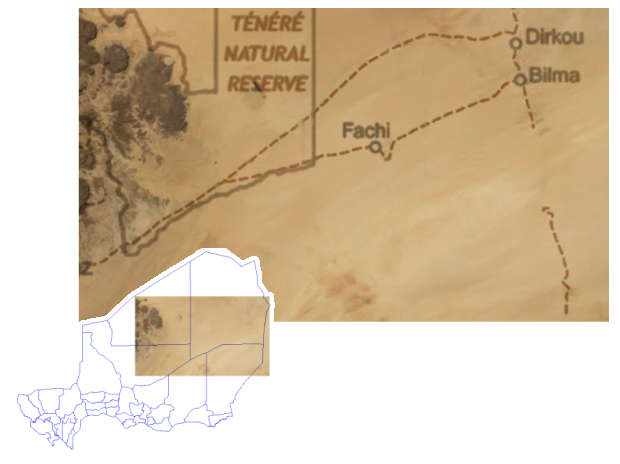

- Location within Niger
- Coordinates: 18°3′48″N 11°36′22″E
- Country: Niger
- Region: Agadez Region
- Department: Bilma Department
- Commune: Fachi

Area
  - Total: 35,536 km^{2} (13,721 sq mi)
- Elevation: 593 m (1,946 ft)

Population (2012 census)
  - Total: 2,215
  - Density: 0.06233/km^{2} (0.1614/sq mi)
- Time zone: UTC+1 (WAT)

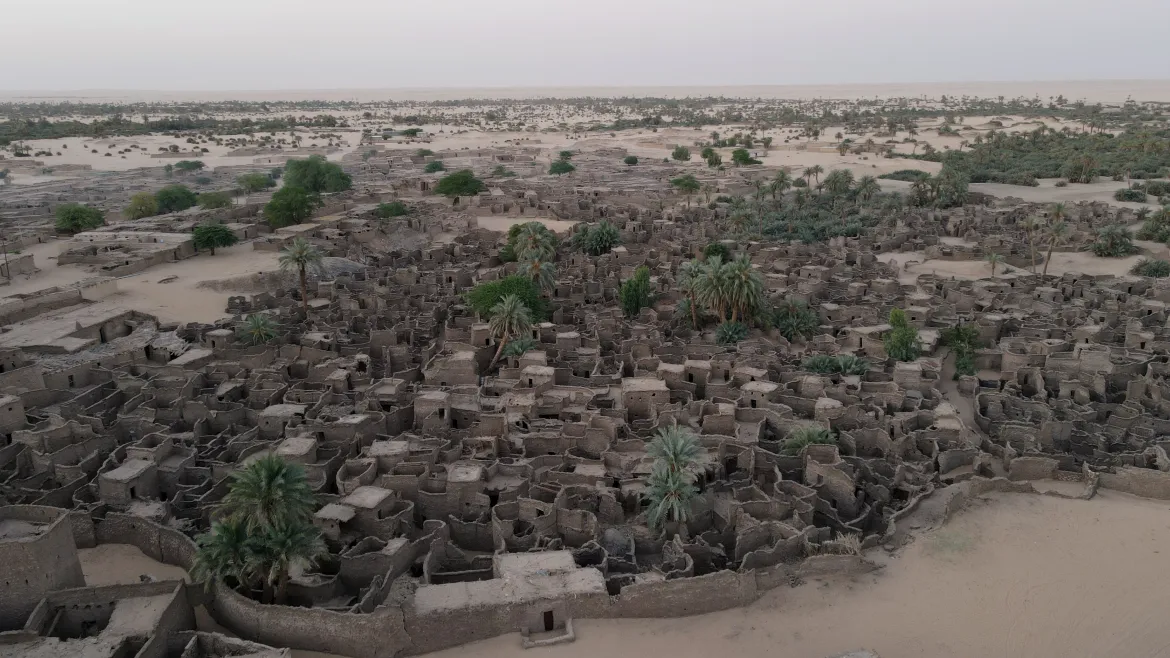
bird's-eye-view of old town Fachi. Views of surrounding suburbs can be seen.

Fachi is an oasis surrounded by the Ténéré desert and the dunes of the Erg of Bilma in eastern Niger, placed on the western edge of the small Agram mountain outcropping. It has a population of 2,215 people (2012). It is also a stopping point of the Agadez to the Kaouar caravans of the Azalay. Fachi is 160 kilometres (100 miles) west of Bilma and 260 km (160 mi) east of the Aïr Mountains. Apart from water, dates, and salt, Fachi produces no provisions, and depends entirely upon trade in these products with passing caravans.

Frequently raided by Tuareg and Bedouins in its past, the town is built within high fortifications, known locally as a ksar, built from banco salt blocks; they are now unused.

Fachi's population is largely from the Kanuri and Toubou peoples, in whose language the town is called Agram. Fachi, its official name, is from Tuareg and Hausa peoples, who at one time lived there in larger numbers. Fachi's main export is dates. In which it produces almost 80% of Niger's date supply. Salt mining is also practised. The area is considered to be a corridor for drug-smuggling: in 2022 the local mayor was arrested with over 200kg of cocaine in a municipal vehicle.
