= Ténéré =

Ténéré Tiniri
- Desert
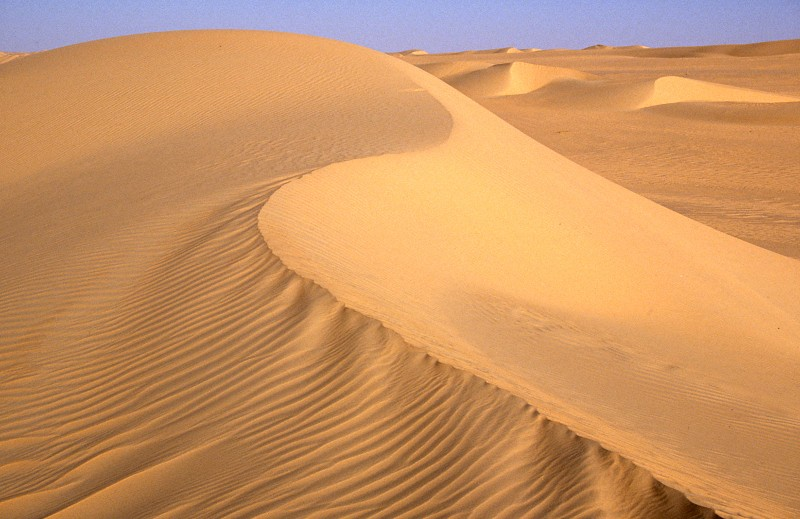
- A dune sea (Erg) between Fachi and Bilma.

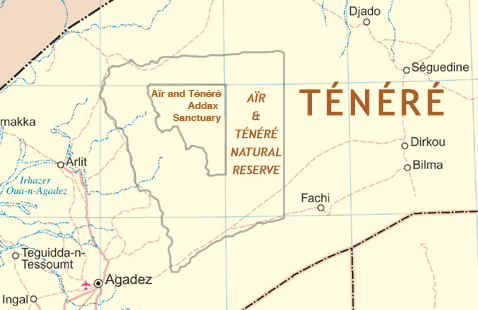
- Map of the Ténéré - Aïr Natural Reserve area.
- Countries: Niger and Chad

Area
  - Total: 400,000 km^{2} (150,000 sq mi)
- Elevation: 430 m (1,410 ft)

The Ténéré (Tuareg: Tenere, literally: "desert") is a desert region in south central Sahara. It comprises a vast plain of sand stretching from northeastern Niger to western Chad, occupying an area of over 400,000 square kilometres (150,000 sq mi). It is bounded by the Aïr Mountains in the west, the Hoggar Mountains in the north, the Djado Plateau in the northeast, the Tibesti Mountains in the east, and the basin of Lake Chad in the south. The central part of the desert contains the Erg of Bilma, an area of sand dunes. The Neolithic Tenerian culture was centred on the region.

== Name ==
The name Ténéré comes from the Tuareg language, meaning "desert", in much the same way as the Arabic word for "desert", Sahara, came to be applied to the region as a whole.

== Climate ==
The Ténéré has a hot desert climate (Köppen climate classification BWh), typical of the large Sahara Desert. The climate is hyper-arid, extremely hot, sunny and dry year-round and there is virtually no plant life. The average high temperatures are above 40 °C (104 °F) for about 5 months and more in the hottest regions, and record high temperatures as high as 50 °C (122 °F) are highly possible during summer. The annual average high temperature is around 35 °C (95 °F). During "winter" months, the average high temperatures stay above 25 °C (77 °F) and generally hover around 30 °C (86 °F).

The annual precipitation amount is extremely low—one of the lowest annual rainfall amounts found on Earth—around 10 mm (0.39 in) to 15 mm (0.59 in), and frequently several years may pass without seeing any rainfall at all. Water is notoriously difficult to find, even underground, and wells may be hundreds of miles apart.

The sunshine duration is also one of the highest results on the planet at around 4,000 hours, that is about 91% of the daylight hours between sunrise and sunset. This part of the Sahara Desert has one of the harshest climates in the world. According to a NASA study, the sunniest spot in the world would be a ruined fort in Agadem in the southeastern Ténéré, and has even clearer skies than the polar deserts overall. The Ténéré, as well as the rest of the Great Desert, are amongst the most extreme environments on Earth.

== Topography ==
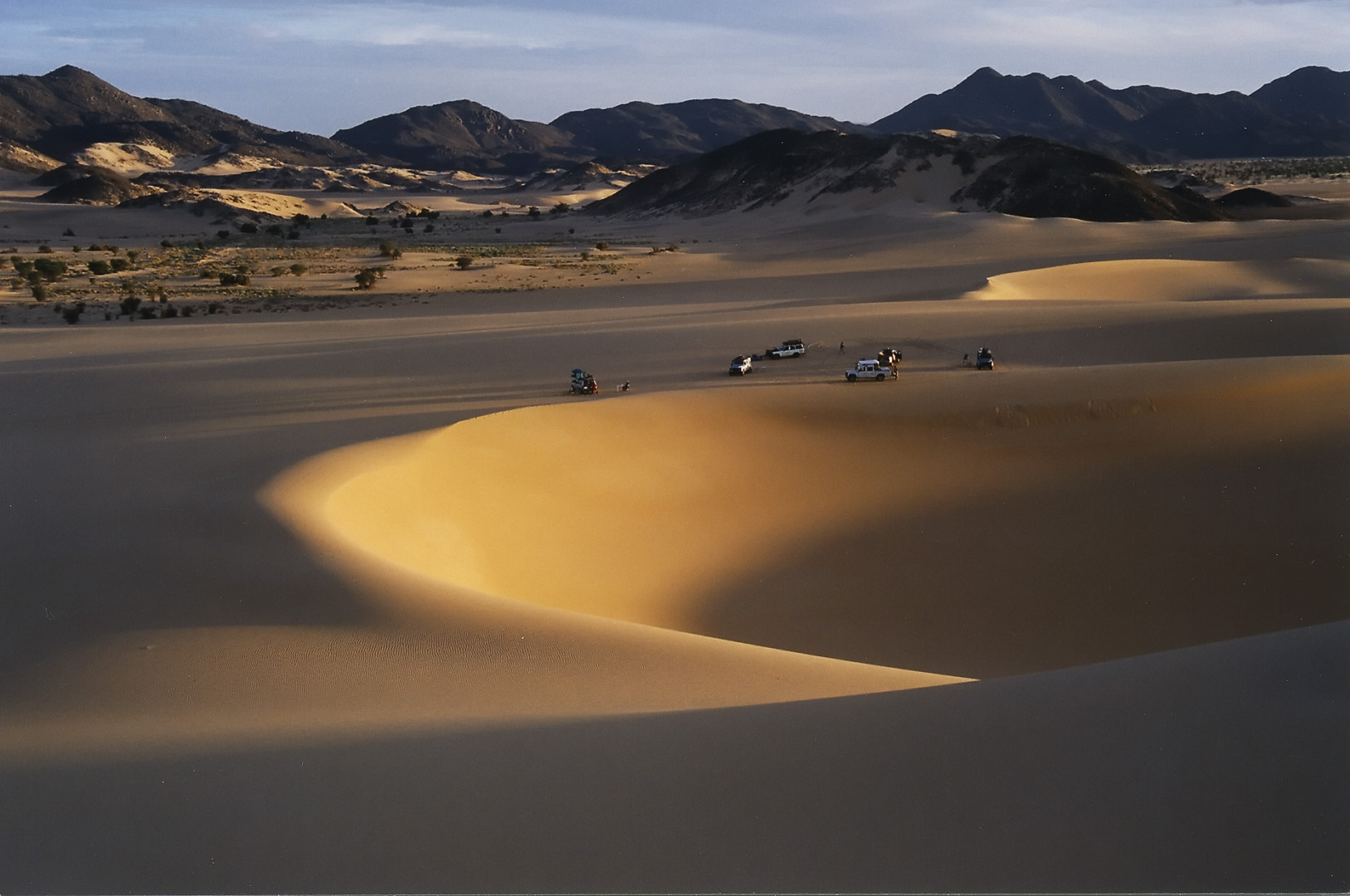
Arakao

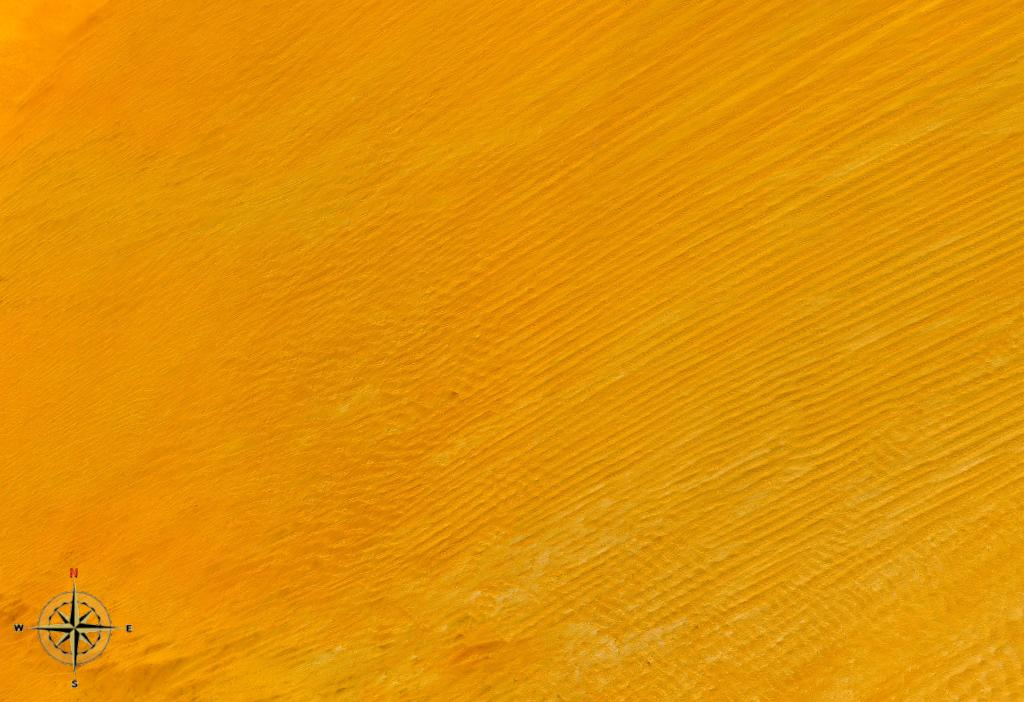
Fragment of Ténéré's dune seas seen from space

Most of the Ténéré is a flat basin, once the bed of the prehistoric Lake Chad. In the north, the Ténéré is a vast sand sheet - the true, featureless 'Ténéré' of legend reaching up to the low hills of the Tassili du Hoggar along the Algerian border. In the centre, the Bilma Erg forms rows of easily navigable low dunes whose corridors make regular byways for the azalai or salt caravans. To the west, the Aïr Mountains rise up. To the southeast, the Ténéré is bordered by the Kaouar cliffs running 100 km north to south. At the base, lies a string of oases including the famous Bilma. Periodic outcrops, such as the unusual marble Blue Mountains in the northwest near Adrar Chiriet, or the Agram hills near the oasis of Fachi and Adrar Madet to the north, are rare but notable landmarks.

== History ==
During the Carboniferous period, the region was beneath the sea; later it was a tropical forest. A major dinosaur cemetery lies southeast of Agadez at Gadoufaoua; many fossils have been found there, having eroded out from the ground. An almost complete specimen of the crocodile-like reptile Sarcosuchus imperator, nicknamed the SuperCroc, was discovered there by paleontologists.

During early human history, this was a fertile land much more congenial to human life than it is now. The region was inhabited by modern humans as long ago as the Paleolithic period some 60,000 years ago. They hunted wild animals and left evidence of their presence in the form of stone tools including tiny, finely carved arrow heads. During the Neolithic period about 10,000 years ago, ancient hunters, the early Holocene Kiffian people, created rock engravings and cave paintings that can still be found across the region.

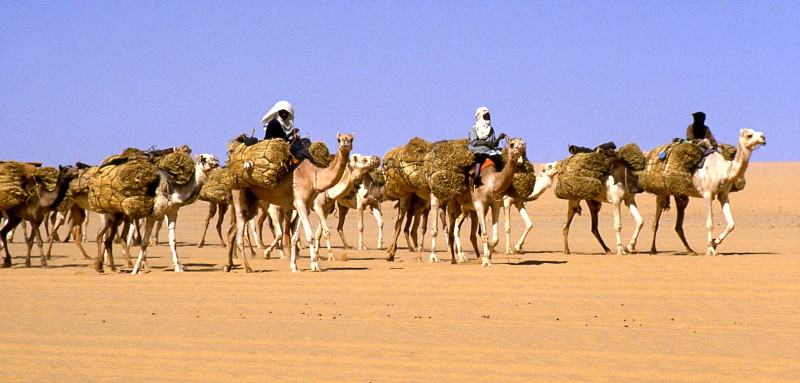
Azalai salt caravan from Agadez to Bilma in 1985

The Neolithic Subpluvial was an extended meteorological period, from about 7,500-7,000 BC to about 3,500-3,000 BC, of relatively wet and rainy conditions in the climate history of northern Africa. It was both preceded and followed by much drier periods. Several archaeological sites that date from this time, often identified as part of the Tenerian culture, are dotted across the deserts along the borders of Niger, Algeria and Libya. The human population dwindled as the Sahara dried out, and by 2500 BC, it had largely become as dry as it is today.

In recent times, Ténéré has been a crossing route for African migrants looking to immigrate to Europe.

=== UTA Flight 772 ===
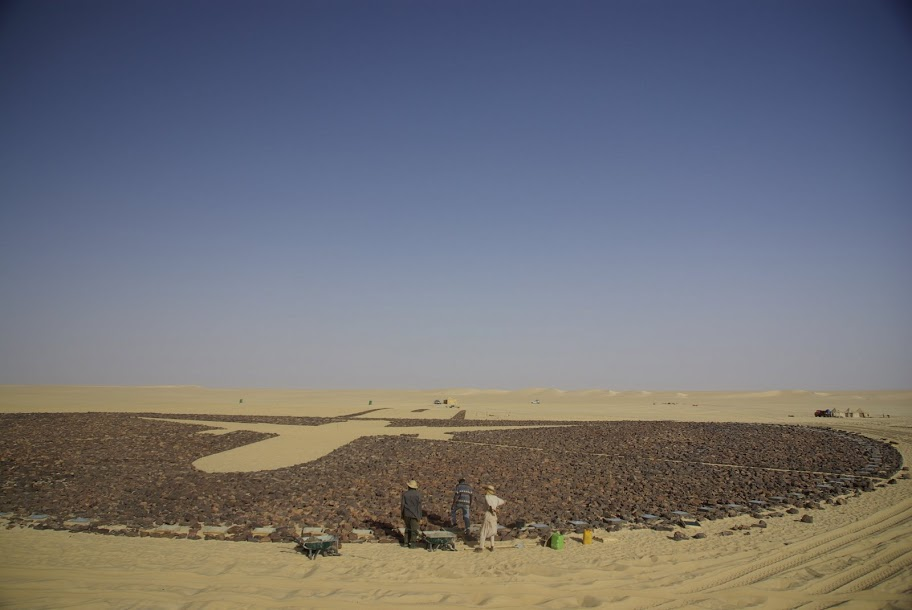
UTA Flight 772 Memorial

On September 19, 1989, a McDonnell Douglas DC-10 took off from N'Djamena International Airport and forty-six minutes later a suitcase bomb exploded in the hold. The jet crashed into the desert near Bilma, Niger, killing everyone aboard. A monument to the victims of the attack, a 200-foot diameter circle of dark stones and 170 broken mirrors, was built in May and June 2007 at 16°51′53″N 11°57′13″E.

== Population ==
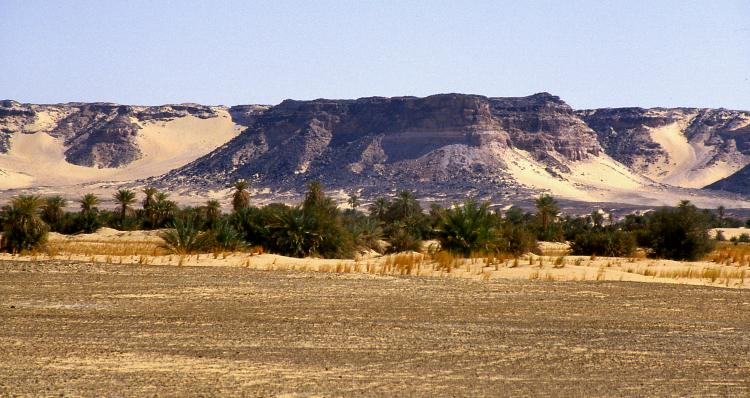
The Kaouar cliffs, near Bilma, which forms a chain of oases in the eastern Ténéré.

The Ténéré is very sparsely populated. Fachi and Bilma are the only settlements that are not on the edge of the Tenéré.

While the well-known Tuareg occupy the Aïr Mountains and Agadez to the west, and still operate the salt caravans for Hausa merchants, other inhabitants of the Ténéré, found from oases like Fachi eastwards, are the non-Berber Kanuri and Toubou.

== Governance ==
In 1960, the Tuareg territory became part of the independent republic of Niger. It has been divided into seven départments. The central part of the Ténéré is a protected area, under the auspices of the Aïr and Ténéré Natural Reserve.

== Cities ==
The administrative centre of the Ténéré is the town of Agadez, south of the Aïr Mountains and west of the Tenere. There are also various oasis settlements, some like Bilma and Séguedine based on salt production.

Settlements and villages of Ténéré:

- Fachi
- Achegour
- Bilma
- Dirkou
- Chirfa
- Agadem
- Séguedine

== Landmarks ==
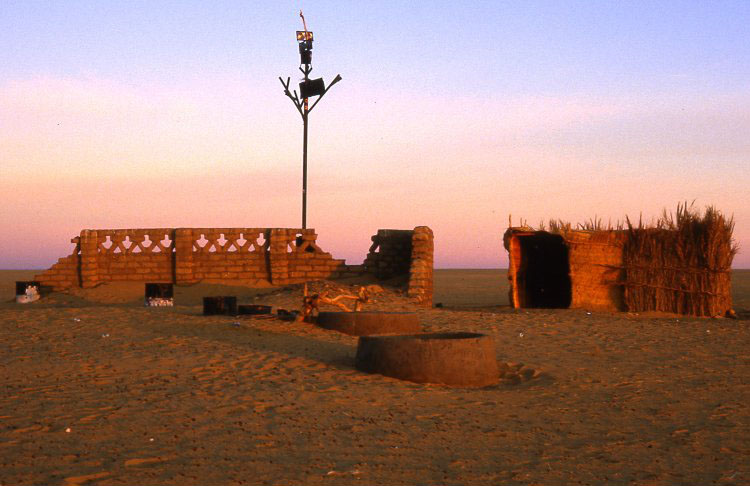
Sculpture memorializing the Arbre du Ténéré (tree of Ténéré)

The desert is also known for the celebrated Tree of Ténéré, once thought to be among the most remote in the world. Situated by the last well before entering the Grand Erg du Bilma on the way to Fachi, salt caravans relied on the tree as a landmark until it was allegedly knocked down by a Libyan truck driver in 1973. It was replaced by a metal sculpture and the remains are enshrined at the museum in Niamey (capital of Niger). New trees were planted, but because of the very low water table (the adjacent well is some 40 m deep), irregular watering by passing travellers saw them fail to survive. Despite this, the tree is still often indicated on maps of the region as a notable landmark, as is the less well-known Arbre Perdu (Lost Tree) situated in the true Tenere to the north, west of Chirfa.

== View ==
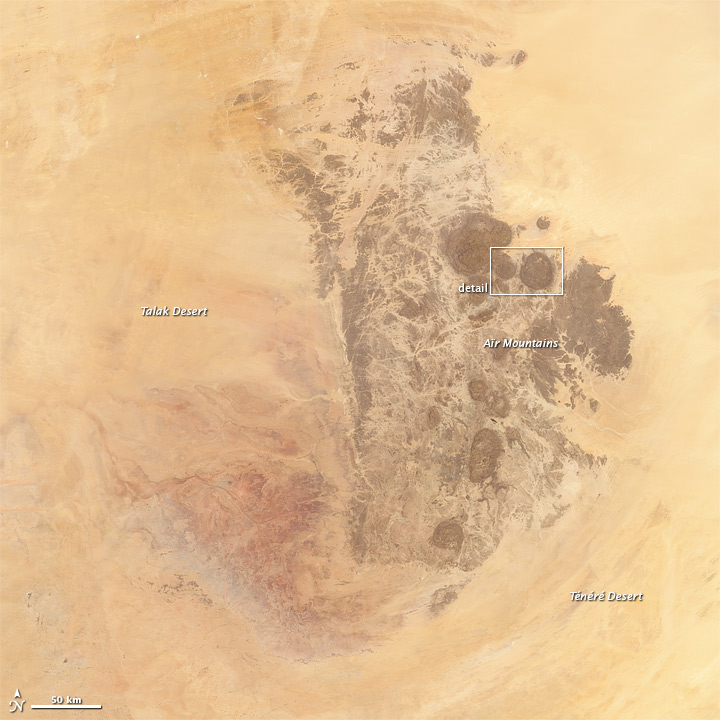
Annotated view

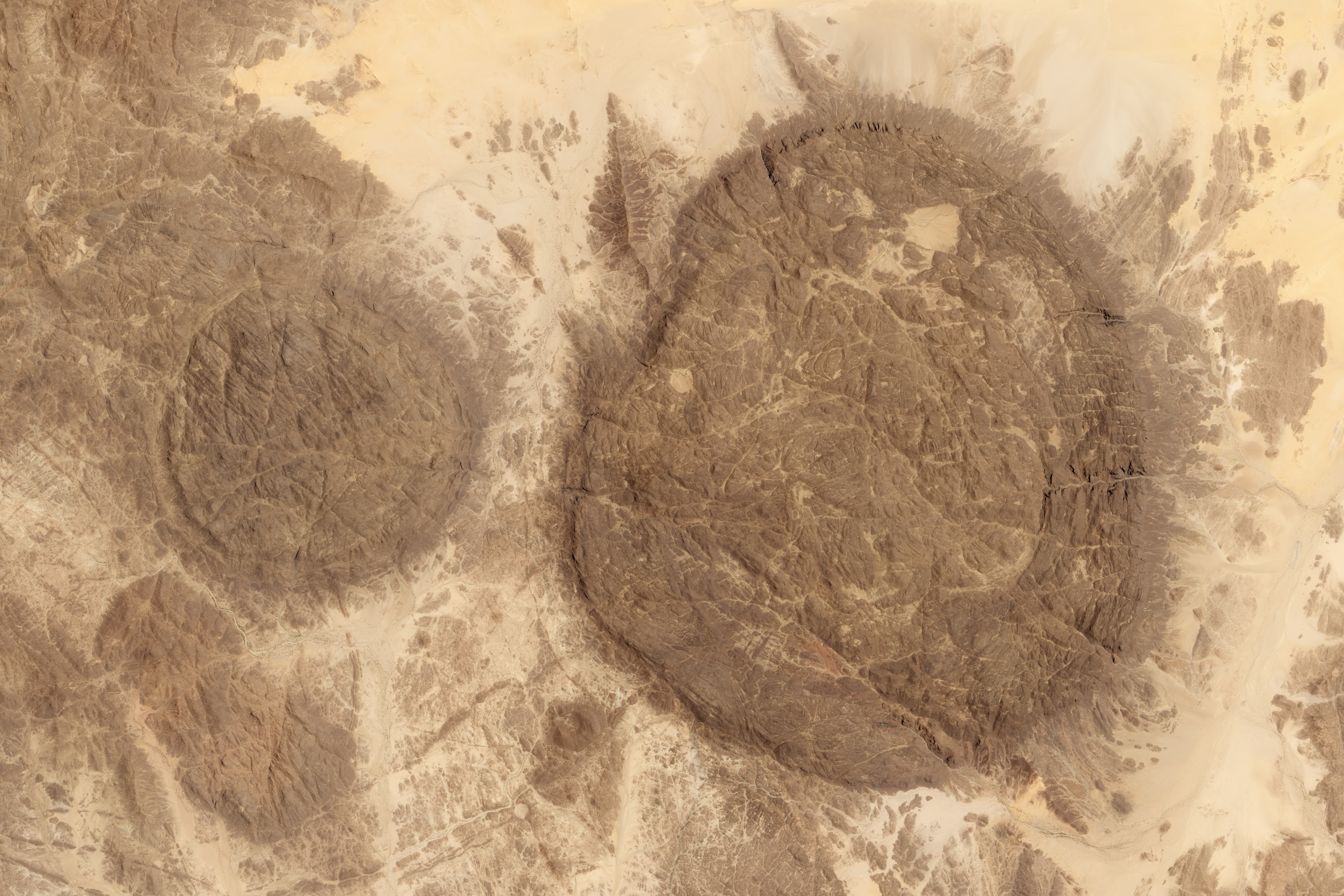
Inset of the above image

== See also ==
- Aïr and Ténéré National Nature Reserve
- Germa
- Green Sahara
- The Ténéré motorbike
- Missions Berliet-Ténéré
