= Dirkou Airport =

Airport in Niger

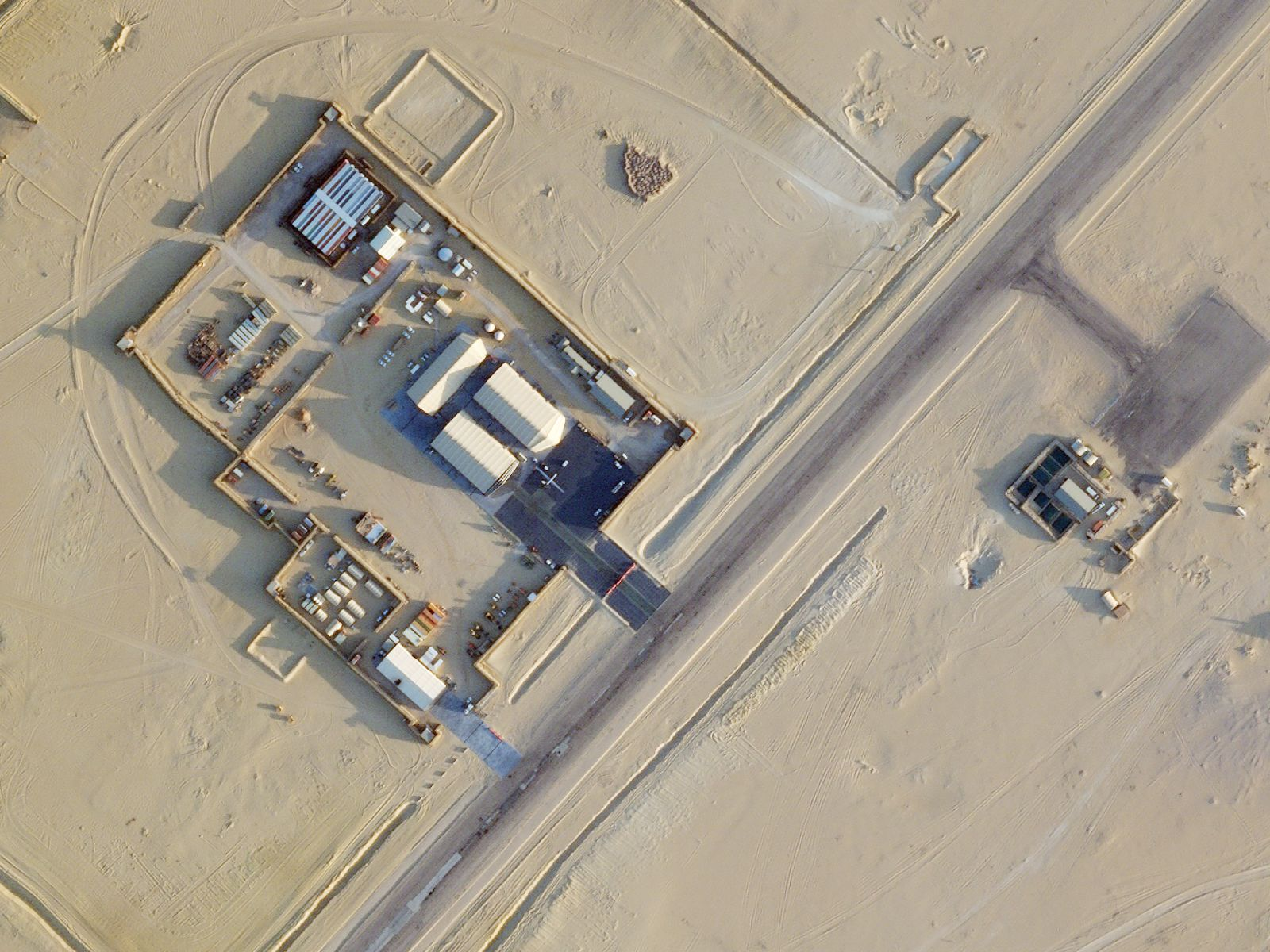
- SkySat photo of a U-28A at the Dirkou Airport CIA annex in March, 2021
- IATA: none; ICAO: DRZD

Summary
- Airport type: Public
- Serves: Dirkou
- Elevation AMSL: 1,273 ft / 388 m
- Coordinates: 18°58′10″N 12°52′10″E

Map
- Location of the airport in Niger

Runways
Direction	Length		Surface
Direction	m	ft	Surface
04/22	1,606	5,269	Asphalt
- Source: Google Maps

Dirkou Airport (ICAO: DRZD) is an airport serving the isolated Saharan outpost of Dirkou, Niger. It is 2 kilometres (1.2 mi) southwest of the city center. In early 2018 the airport saw extensive expansion during construction of a base for Central Intelligence Agency drone operations.

== See also ==
- Transport in Niger
- List of airports in Niger
