= Lost Tree =

Remote tree in Ténéré, Northeast Niger

Coordinates: 20.645°N 11.249°E

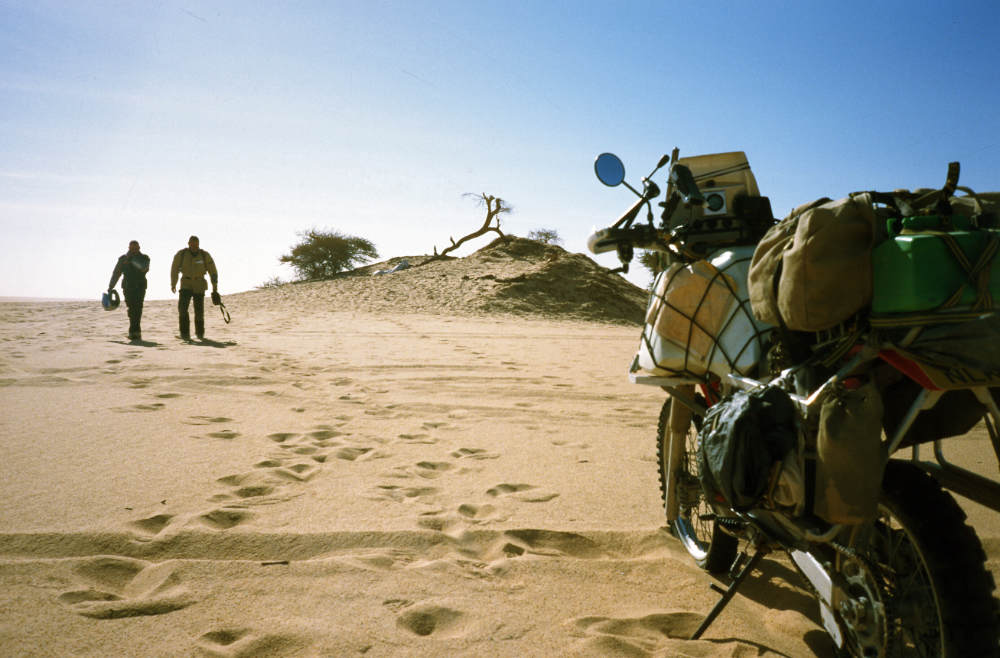
Bikers approaching the tree, 2003

The Lost Tree (French: Arbre Perdu), also known as the Arbre Thierry Sabine (Thierry Sabine Tree) and the Tree Niger, is an isolated relict tree in the Ténéré region of the Sahara in northeast Niger.

The tree is an acacia clinging to its exposed root mound, and annually denuded by passing travellers seeking firewood. Despite its small and diminished state, the tree's remoteness makes it an important visual landmark on the desolate route between Adrar Bous in the northern Aïr Mountains, and the outpost of Chirfa on the edge of the Djado Plateau.

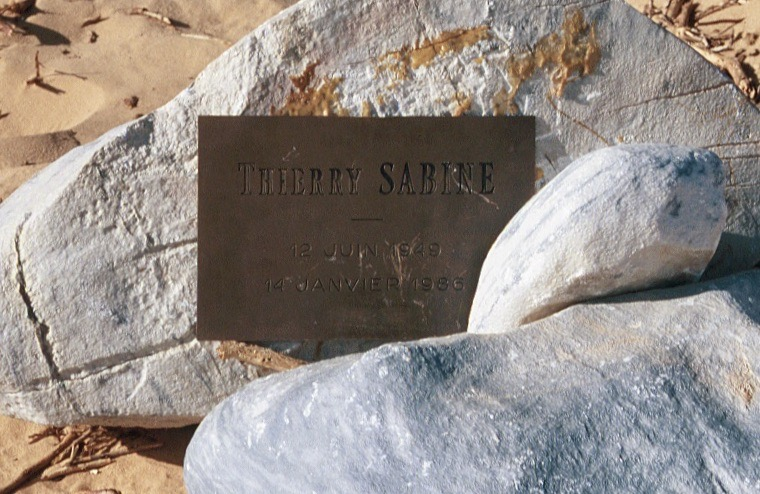
Plaque commemorating the death of Thierry Sabine

Thierry Sabine, founder of the Dakar Rally which ran in Africa from 1979 to 2007, died in a helicopter crash near Timbuktu during the 1986 rally. His ashes were scattered at the Lost Tree some days later at a memorial service. The Ténéré was special to Sabine after he was stranded on the nearby Tchigaï Plateau during the 1977 Abidjan-Nice rally.

Rally maps printed after his death were the first to call the tree as "Arbre Thierry Sabine". A marble and brass plaque on rocks below the tree is dedicated to his memory, and the original supposedly read: "For those who go a challenge – for those who stay (home) a dream".

== See also ==
- Tree of Ténéré
- List of individual trees
