= Séguédine =

Séguédine Seguedine
- Commune
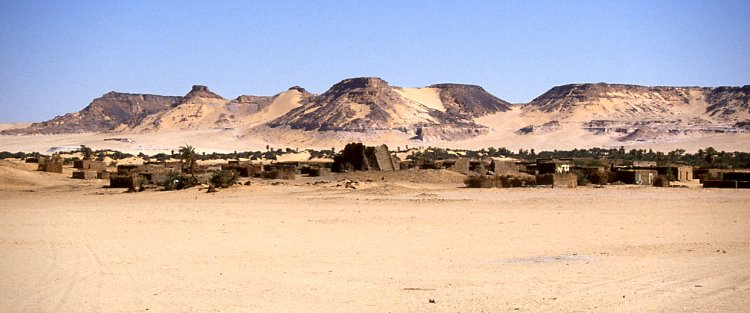
- Séguédine, 1989.

- Location within Niger
- Coordinates: 20°11′31″N 12°58′3″E
- Country: Niger
- Region: Agadez Region
- Department: Bilma Department
- Commune: Djado
- Elevation: 459 m (1,506 ft)

Population
  - Total: 485

Séguédine is a town in central eastern Niger, lying at the far northern tip of the Kaouar escarpment, an inhabited oasis in the midst of the Sahara Desert. It is a Commune of Bilma Department, Agadez Region.

While isolated in modern Niger, it once lay on the important central Sudan route of the Trans-Saharan trade which linked coastal Libya and the Fezzan to the Kanem–Bornu Empire near Lake Chad. Its population is made up primarily of traditionally sedentary Kanuri people, as well as semi-nomadic Tuareg and Tubu people.
