= Abu Ishaq Ibrahim al-Kanemi =

African poet

Abū Isḥāq Ibrāhīm al-Kānemī (Arabic: أبو إسحاق إبراهيم الكانمي; died c. 1212), was a West African poet and grammarian from the Kanem-Bornu Empire of contemporary Nigeria, Niger, Cameroon, Libya, and Chad. He was the first to write in Arabic in the central Sudan.

Ibrāhīm was born in the oasis of Bilma, then a part of Kanem. In one poem, he refers to himself as belonging to the Dhakwān branch of the Banū Sulaym. The Dhakwān moved from Upper Egypt to North Africa in the 11th century. He is described as "jet-black in hue", indicating that his mother at least was Sub-Saharan African. He was educated in the Sudan; in Ghana, according to Ibn Ḥamuwayh.

Ibrāhīm visited Marrakesh around 1197–98, gaining there a reputation as a grammarian and poet. Only fragments of eight of his works survive, mainly quotations in the works of Ibn al-Abbār and Ibn al-Shaʿār. A poem in which he explains why he eschewed satire and wrote mostly qaṣīdas is quoted by both. He was patronized by the Almohad Caliph Yaʿqūb al-Manṣūr (1184–1199). Two lines of a poem Ibrāhīm recited before his patron are quoted by the 19th-century historian Aḥmad al-Nāṣirī al-Salāwī. Ibrāhīm wrote panegyrics on other leading Almohad figures and was a friend of fellow panegyrist ʿAbd al-Raḥmān Fāzāzī, who praised his verses. He also wrote in defence of his dark skin and exchanged stanzas on his race with al-Jirāwī. In Marrakesh, he married a "white" woman named Zahrāʾ and wrote her poetry dealing with his dark skin.

Ibrāhīm eventually moved to al-Andalus (Spain). He resided in Seville. He died in Spain in AH 608 or 609 (between AD 1211 and 1213).

== Bibliography ==
- Arié, Rachel (1993). "Review of Bencherifa 1991". Arabica. 40 (1): 131–132. doi:10.1163/157005893X00354.
- Bencherifa, Mohammed (1991). Ibrâhîm al-Kânimî (m. 609/1212–1213), figure illustre dans les relations culturelles entre le Maroc et Bilâd al-Sûdân. Université Mohammed V, Publications de l'Institut des Études Africaines.
- Hunwick, John (1995). Arabic Literature of Africa, Volume 2: Writings of Central Sudanic Africa. E. J. Brill.
- Hunwick, John (1997). "The Arabic Literary Tradition of Nigeria". Research in African Literatures. 28 (3): 210–223. JSTOR 3821003.
- Martin, B. G. (1969). "Kanem, Bornu, and the Fazzan: Notes on the Political History of a Trade Route". The Journal of African History. 10 (1): 15–27. doi:10.1017/S0021853700009257. JSTOR 180293.
- Shaw, Flora L. (1905). A Tropical Dependency: An Outline of the Ancient History of the Western Sudan with an Account of the Modern Settlement of Northern Nigeria. James Nisbet and Co.
