= Trans-Saharan trade =

Trade between sub-Saharan Africa and North Africa

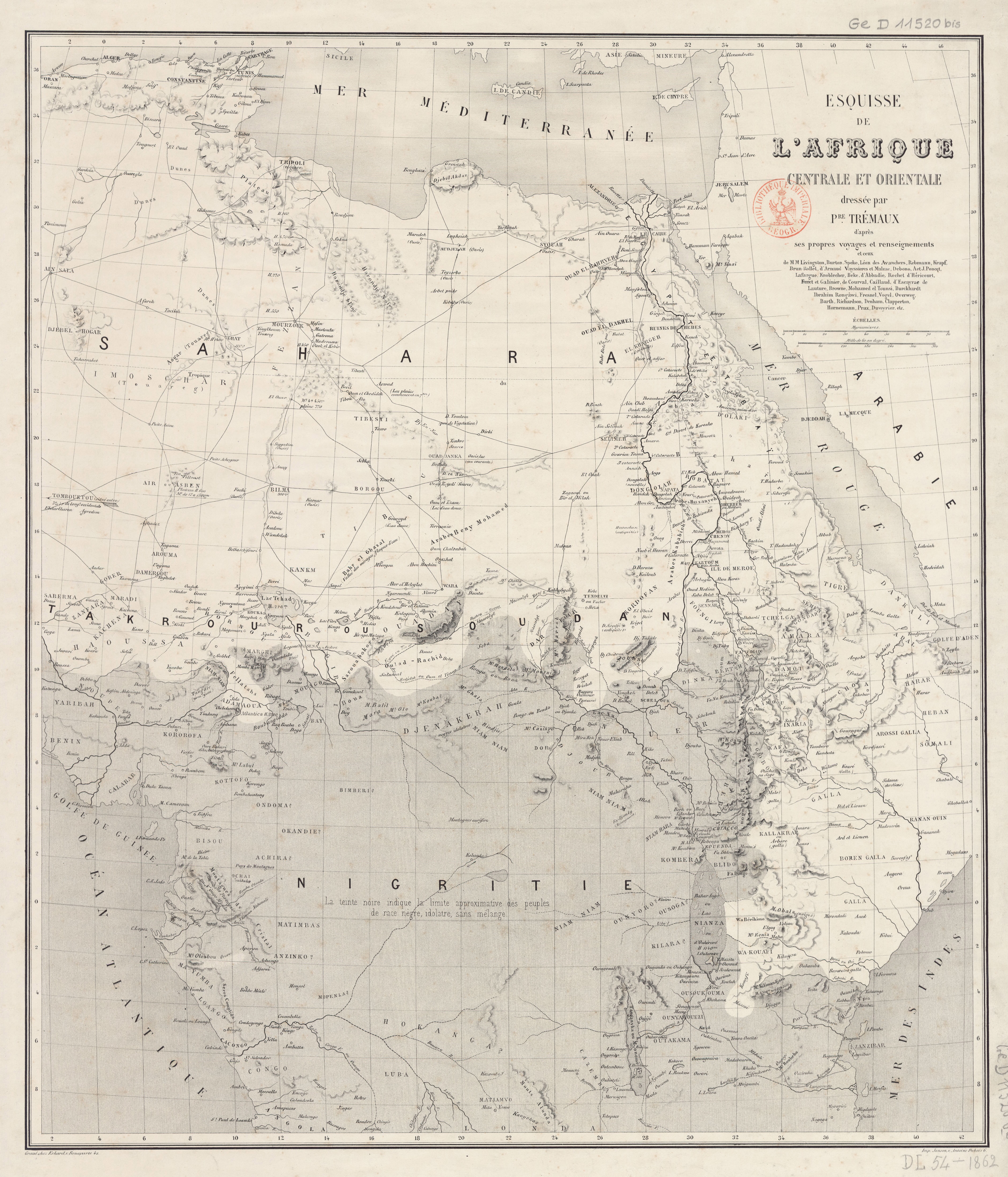
French-language map showing the major trans-Saharan trade routes (1862)

Trans-Saharan trade is trade between North Africa and the rest of Africa that requires travel across the Sahara. Though this trade began in prehistoric times, the peak of trade extended from the 8th century until the early 17th century. The Sahara once had a different climate and environment. In Libya and Algeria, from at least 7000 BCE, pastoralism (the herding of sheep and goats), large settlements and pottery were present. Cattle were introduced to the central Sahara (Ahaggar) between 4000 and 3500 BCE. Remarkable rock paintings (dated 3500 to 2500 BCE) in arid regions portray flora and fauna that are not present in the modern desert.

As it became a desert, the Sahara separated the Mediterranean economy from the Niger River basin. As Fernand Braudel points out, crossing such a zone, especially without mechanized transport, is worthwhile only when exceptional circumstances cause the expected gain to outweigh the cost and the danger. Trade was conducted by caravans of camels. According to Maghrebi explorer Ibn Battuta, who once traveled with a caravan, an average one would amount to 1,000 camels, but some caravans were as large as 12,000. The caravans were guided by highly-paid Berbers who knew the desert and could ensure protection from fellow desert nomads. Survival relied on careful coordination: runners would be sent ahead to oases for water to be shipped out to the caravan when it was still several days away, as the caravans could usually not carry enough to make the full journey. In the mid-14th century, Ibn Battuta crossed the desert from Sijilmasa via the salt mines at Taghaza to the oasis of Oualata. A guide was sent ahead, and water was brought over a four-day journey from Oualata to meet the caravan.

Culture and religion were also exchanged on the trans-Saharan trade routes. Many West African states eventually adopted Arabic writing and the religion of North Africa, resulting in these states' absorption into the Muslim world.

== Early history ==
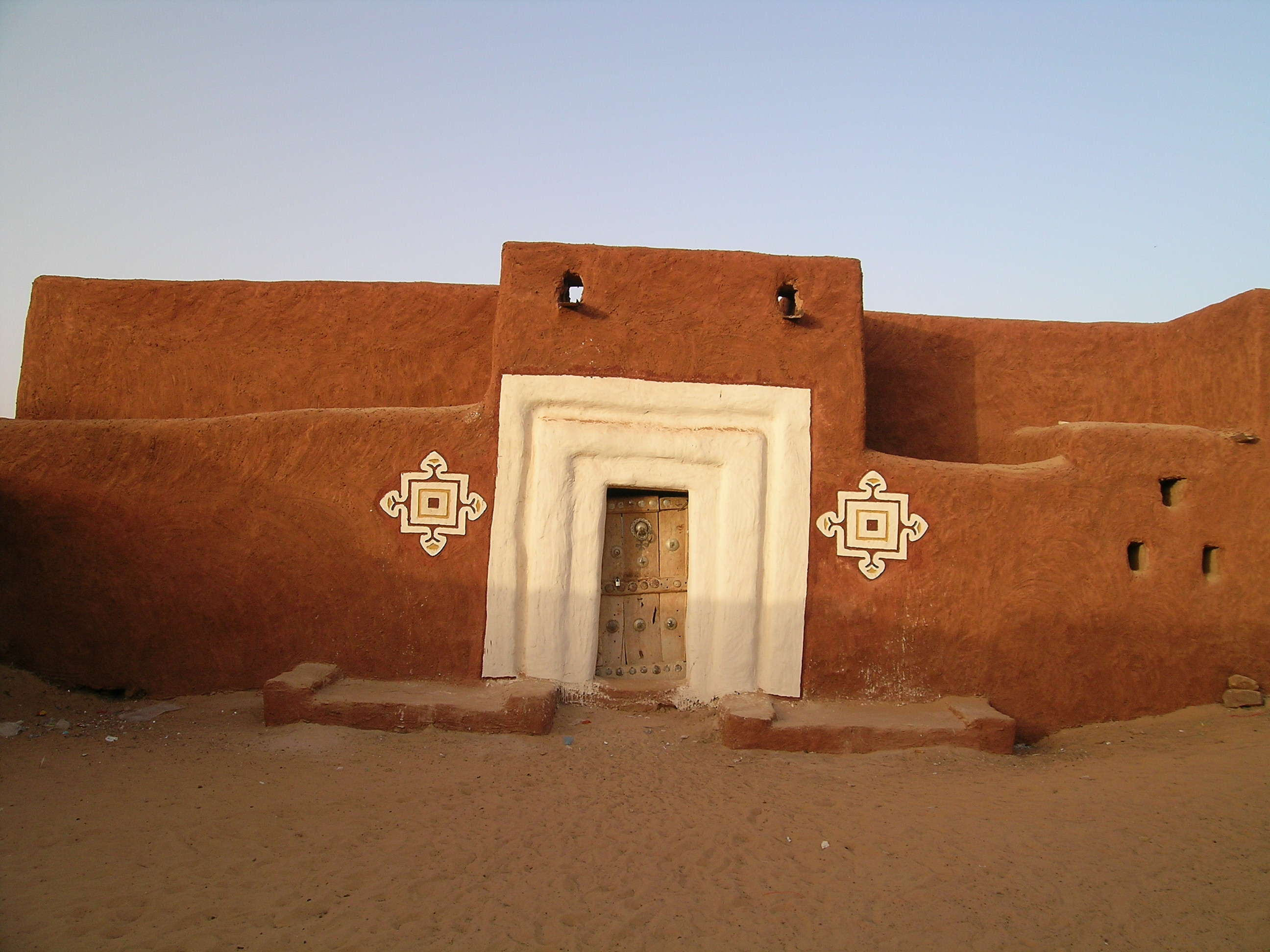
A building in Oualata, southeast Mauritania

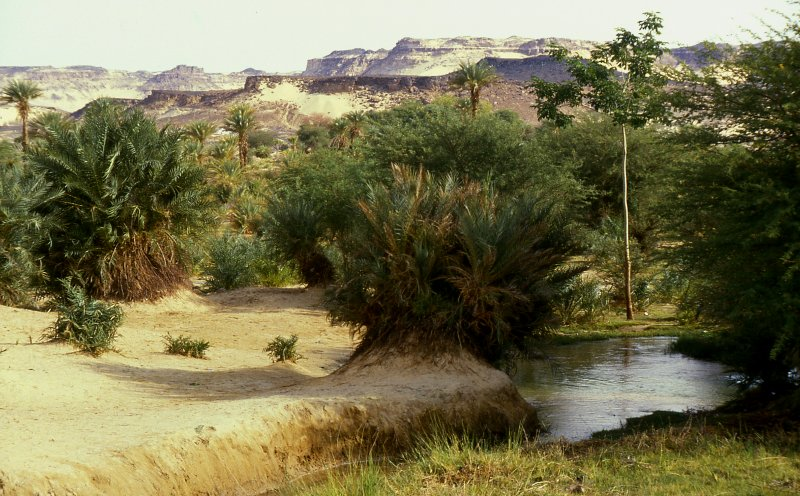
The Bilma oasis in northeast Niger, with the Kaouar escarpment in the background

Ancient trade spanned the northeastern corner of the Sahara in the Naqadan era. Predynastic Egyptians in the Naqada I period traded with Nubia to the south, the oases of the Western Desert, and the cultures of the eastern Mediterranean to the east. Many trading routes went from oasis to oasis to resupply on both food and water. Obsidian was imported from Senegal to shape blades and other objects.

The overland route through the Wadi Hammamat from the Nile to the Red Sea was known as early as predynastic times; drawings depicting Egyptian reed boats have been found along the path dating to 4000 BCE. Ancient cities dating to the First Dynasty of Egypt arose along both its Nile and Red Sea junctions, testifying to the route's ancient popularity. It became a major route from Thebes to the Red Sea port of Elim, where travelers then moved on to either Asia, Arabia or the Horn of Africa. Records exist documenting knowledge of the route among Senusret I, Seti, Ramesses IV and the Roman Empire, especially for mining.

The Darb El Arba'īn trade route, passing through Kharga in the south and Asyut in the north, was used from as early as the Old Kingdom for the transport and trade of gold, ivory, spices, wheat, animals and plants. Later, Ancient Romans would protect the route by lining it with varied forts and small outposts, some guarding large settlements complete with cultivation. Described by Herodotus as a road "traversed ... in forty days", it became by his time an important land route facilitating trade between Nubia and Egypt, and subsequently became known as the Forty Days Road. From Kobbei, 40 kilometres (25 mi) north of al-Fashir, the route passed through the desert to Bir Natrum, another oasis and salt mine, to Wadi Howar before proceeding to Egypt.

The westernmost of the three central routes was the Ghadames Road, which ran from the Niger River at Gao north to Ghat and Ghadames before terminating at Tripoli.

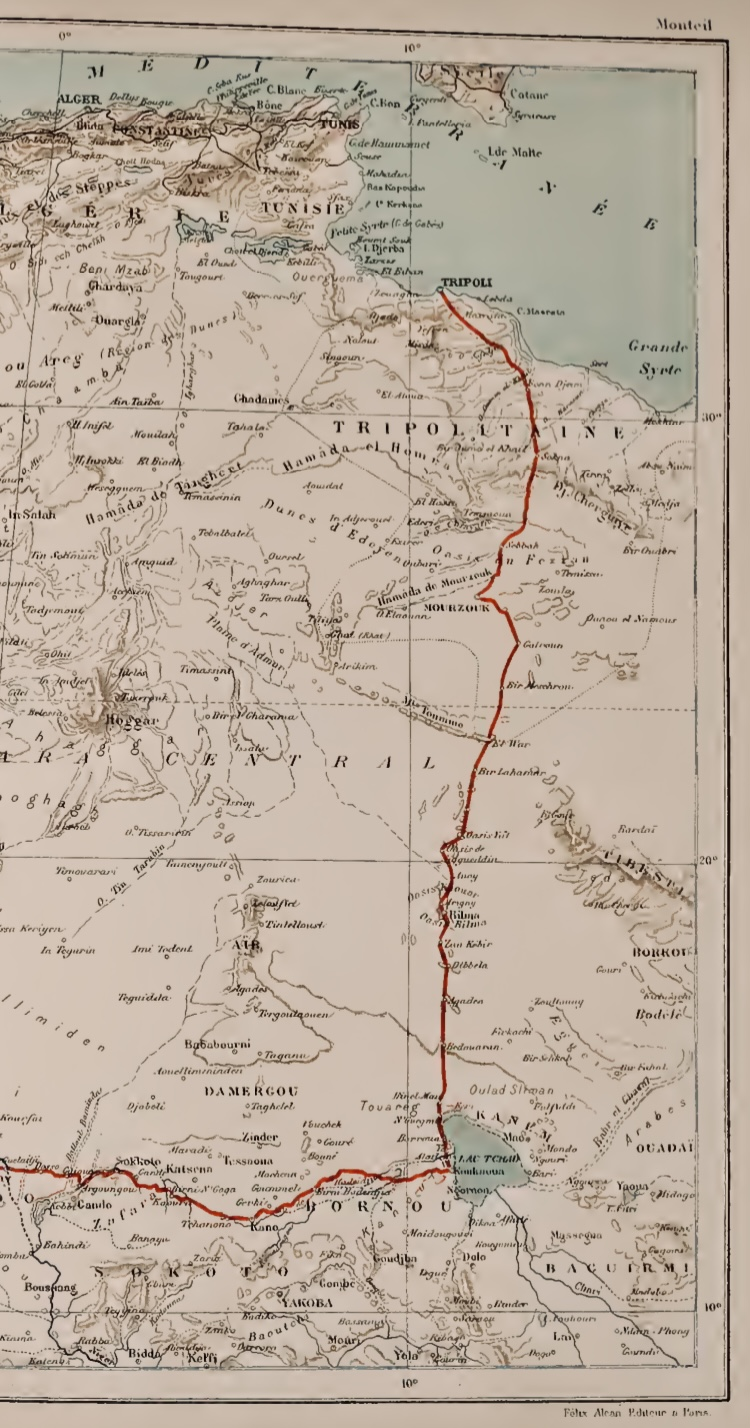
Tripoli–Murzuk–Lake Chad route map by Parfait-Louis Monteil (1895)

Next was the easiest of the three routes: the Garamantean Road, named after the former rulers of the land it passed through and also called the Bilma Trail. The Garamantean Road passed south of the desert near Murzuk before turning north to pass between the Alhaggar and Tibesti Mountains before reaching the oasis at Kawar. From Kawar, caravans would pass over the great sand dunes of Bilma, where rock salt was mined in great quantities for trade, before reaching the savanna north of Lake Chad. This was the shortest of the routes, and the primary exchanges were slaves and ivory from the south for salt. One early 20th century researcher writes of the Tripoli-Murzuk-Lake Chad route, "Most of the traffic from the Mediterranean coast during the last 2,000 years has passed along this road."

Another Libyan route was Benghazi to Kufra to the lands of the Wadai Empire between Lake Chad and Darfur.

The western routes were the Walata Road past present-day Oualata, Mauritania, from the Sénégal River, and the Taghaza Trail, from the Niger River, past the salt mines of Taghaza, north to the great trading center of Sijilmasa, situated in Morocco just north of the desert. The growth of Aoudaghost, founded in the 5th century BCE, was stimulated by its position at the southern end of a trans-Saharan trade route.

To the east, three routes connected the south to the Mediterranean. The herdsmen of the Fezzan of Libya, known as the Garamantes, controlled these routes as early as 1500 BCE. From their capital of Germa in the Wadi Ajal, the Garamantes raided north to the sea and south into the Sahel. By the 4th century BCE, the independent city-states of Phoenicia had expanded their control to the territory and routes once held by the Garamantes. Shillington states that existing contact with the Mediterranean received added incentive with the growth of the port city of Carthage. Founded c. 800 BCE, Carthage became one terminus for West African gold, ivory, and slaves. West Africa received salt, cloth, beads, and metal goods. Shillington proceeds to identify this trade route as the source for West African iron smelting. Trade continued into Roman times. Although there are classical references to direct travel from the Mediterranean to West Africa (Daniels, p. 22f), most of this trade was conducted through middlemen, inhabiting the area and aware of passages through the drying lands. The Legio III Augusta subsequently secured these routes on behalf of Rome by the 1st century CE, safeguarding the southern border of the empire for two and half centuries.

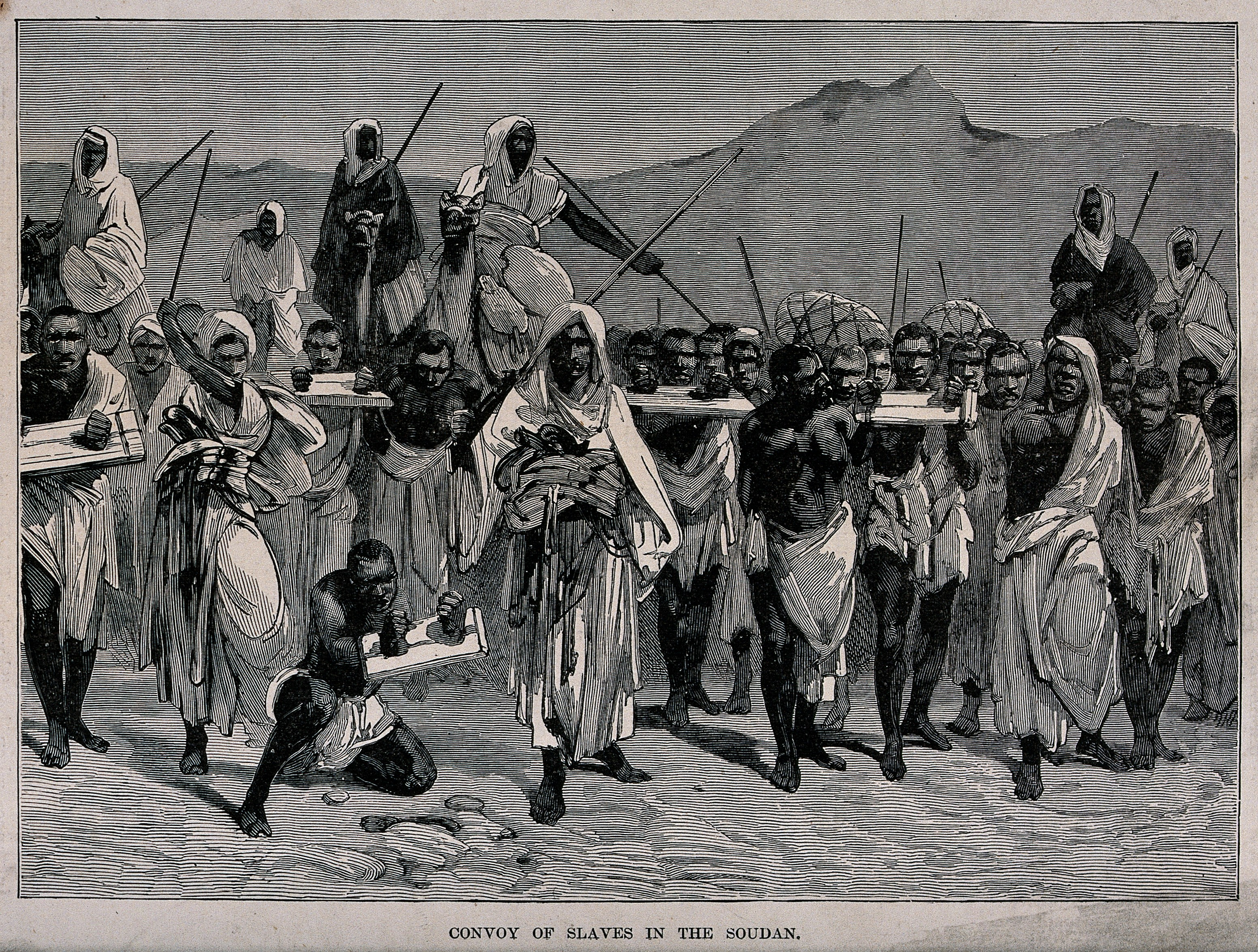
A 19th-century engraving of an Arab or Berber slave-trading caravan transporting sub-Saharan African slaves across the Sahara

The Garamantes engaged in the trans-Saharan slave trade. The Garamantes used slaves in their own communities to construct and maintain underground irrigation systems known as the foggara. Early records come from Herodotus, who records the Garamantes enslaving cave-dwelling Egyptians in Sudan. Two records of Romans accompanying the Garamantes on slave raiding expeditions are recorded: the first in 86 CE and the second a few years later to Lake Chad. Initial sources of slaves were the Toubou people, but by the 1st century CE, the Garamantes were obtaining slaves from modern day Niger and Chad.

In the early Roman Empire, the city of Lepcis established a slave market to buy and sell slaves from the African interior. The empire imposed customs tax on the trade of slaves. In the 5th century CE, Roman Carthage was trading in black slaves brought across the Sahara. Black slaves seem to have been valued in the Mediterranean as household slaves for their exotic appearance. Some historians argue that the scale of slave trade in this period may have been higher than medieval times due to high demand of slaves in the Roman Empire.

== Introduction of the camel ==
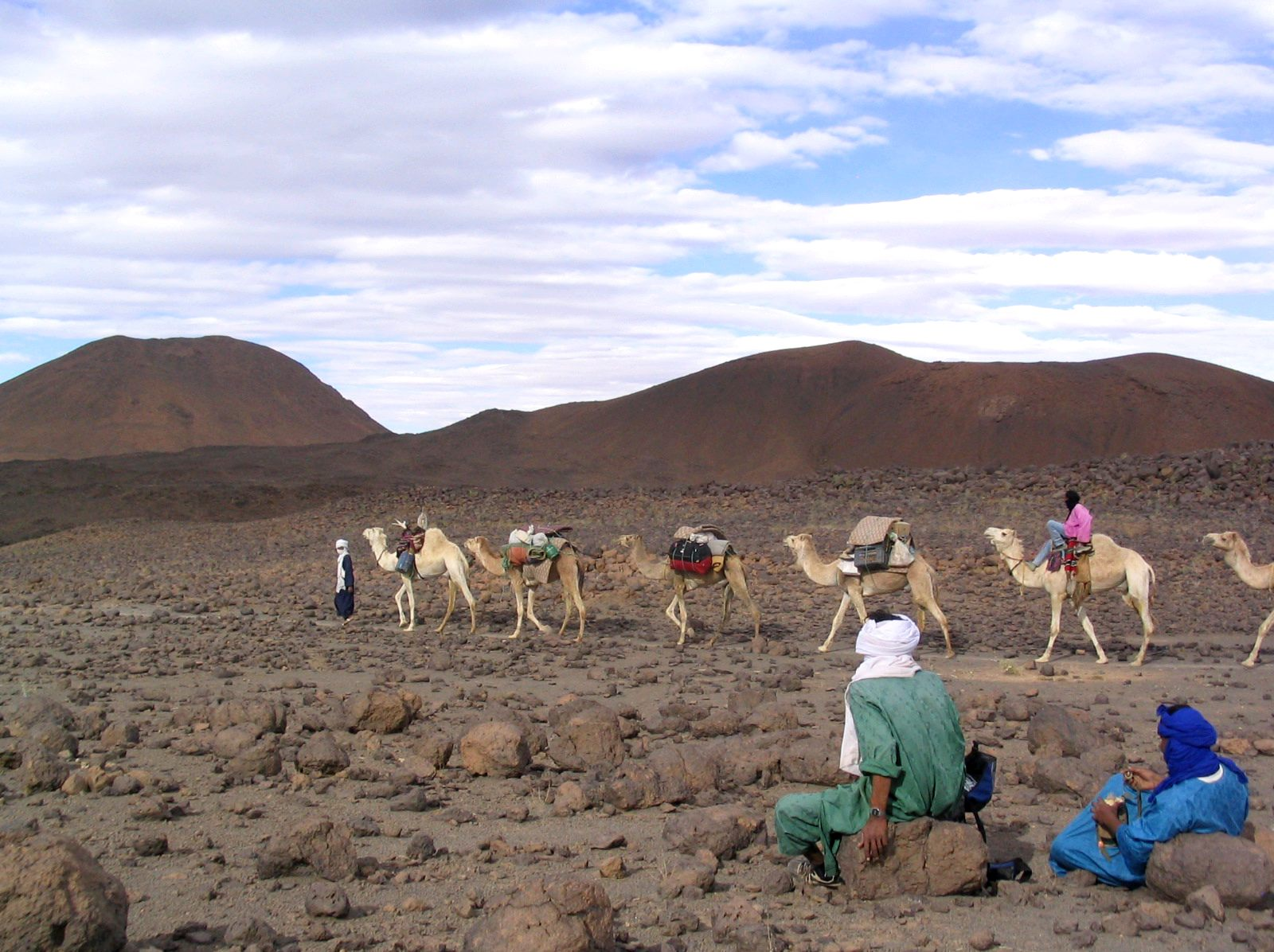
Modern-day camel caravan near the Ahaggar Mountains in the central Sahara, 2006

Herodotus writes of the Garamantes hunting Ethiopian Troglodytes from chariots; this account was associated with depictions of horses drawing chariots in contemporary cave art in southern Morocco and the Fezzan, giving origin to a theory that the Garamantes or some other Saharan people had created chariot routes to provide Rome and Carthage with gold and ivory. However, it has been argued that no horse skeletons have been found dating from this early period in the region, and chariots would have been unlikely vehicles for trading purposes because of their small capacity.

The earliest evidence for domesticated camels in the region dates from the 3rd century. Used by the Berbers, they enabled more regular contact across the entire width of the Sahara, but regular trade routes did not develop until the beginnings of the Islamic conversion of West Africa in the 7th and 8th centuries. Two main trade routes developed. The first ran through the western desert from modern Morocco to the Niger bend, the second from modern Tunisia to the Lake Chad area. These stretches were relatively short and had the essential network of occasional oases that established the routing as inexorably as pins in a map. Further east of the Fezzan with its trade route through the valley of Kaouar to Lake Chad, Libya was impassable with its lack of oases and fierce sandstorms.

== Medieval history ==
Several trade routes became established, perhaps the most important terminating in Sijilmasa and Ifriqiya to the north. There, and in other North African cities, Berber traders had increased contact with Islam, encouraging conversions, and by the 8th century, Muslims were traveling to the Ghana Empire. Many in Ghana converted to Islam, and it is likely that the empire's trade was privileged as a result. Around 1050, Ghana lost Aoudaghost to the Almoravids, but new goldmines around Bure reduced trade through the city, instead benefiting the Malinke of the south, who later founded the Mali Empire. Sijilmasa peaked in importance as a trading city in the 11th and 12th centuries under the Almoravids, because of its access to gold and therefore its ability to mint gold dinars, as well as its access to the unique Tafilalt agricultural oasis that allowed the city to feed those participating in the caravan economy.

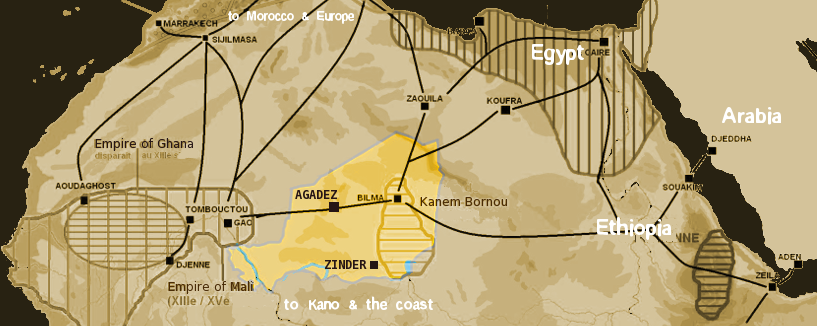
Saharan trade routes circa 1400, with the modern territory of Niger highlighted

Unlike Ghana, Mali was a Muslim kingdom since its foundation, and under it, the gold–salt trade continued. Other trade goods were slaves, kola nuts from the south and slave beads and cowry shells from the north (for use as currency). It was under Mali that the great cities of the Niger bend—including Gao and Djenné—prospered, with Timbuktu in particular becoming known across Europe for its great wealth. Important trading centers in southern West Africa developed at the transitional zone between the forest and the savanna; examples include Begho and Bono Manso and Bondoukou. Western trade routes continued to be important, with Ouadane, Oualata and Chinguetti being the major trade centres, while the Tuareg towns of Assodé and later Agadez grew around a more easterly route.

Trade routes of the Western Sahara c. 1000–1500. Goldfields are indicated by light brown shading: Bambuk, Bure, Lobi, and Akan.

The eastern trans-Saharan route led to the development of the long-lived Kanem–Bornu Empire as well as the Ghana, Mali, and Songhai empires, centred on the Lake Chad area. This trade route was somewhat less efficient and only rose to great prominence when there was turmoil in the west such as during the Almohad conquests.

=== Slave trade ===
The trans-Saharan slave trade continued during the Middle Ages. The slaves brought from across the Sahara were mainly used by wealthy families as domestic servants, and concubines. Some served in the military forces of Egypt and Morocco. For example, the 17th century sultan Moulay Ismail was the son of a slave and relied on an army of black slaves for support. The West African states imported highly trained slave soldiers.

Estimating the number of enslaved people who were transported via the trans-Saharan routes is challenging, particularly prior to widespread record-keeping. Historian John Wright offers an estimated average of 5,000 people per year over the 1,250 years of the trade (from the 7th to 20th century), resulting in a total estimate of "between 6 and 7 million". The majority of these people were transported after the 16th century.

=== Saharan triangle trade ===
The rise of the Ghana Empire accompanied the increase in trans-Saharan trade. Northern economies were short of gold but at times controlled salt mines such as Taghaza in the Sahara, whereas West African realms or states like Wangara had plenty of gold but needed salt. Taghaza, a trading and mining outpost where Ibn Battuta recorded the buildings were made of salt, rose to preeminence in the salt trade under the hegemony of the Almoravid dynasty. The salt was mined by slaves and purchased with manufactured goods from Sijilmasa. Miners cut thin rectangular slabs of salt directly out of the desert floor, and caravan merchants transported them south, charging a transportation fee of almost 80% of the salt's value. The salt was traded at the market of Timbuktu almost weight for weight with gold. The gold, in the form of bricks, bars, blank coins, and gold dust went to Sijilmasa, from which it went out to Mediterranean ports and in which it was struck into Almoravid dinars.

=== Spread of Islam ===
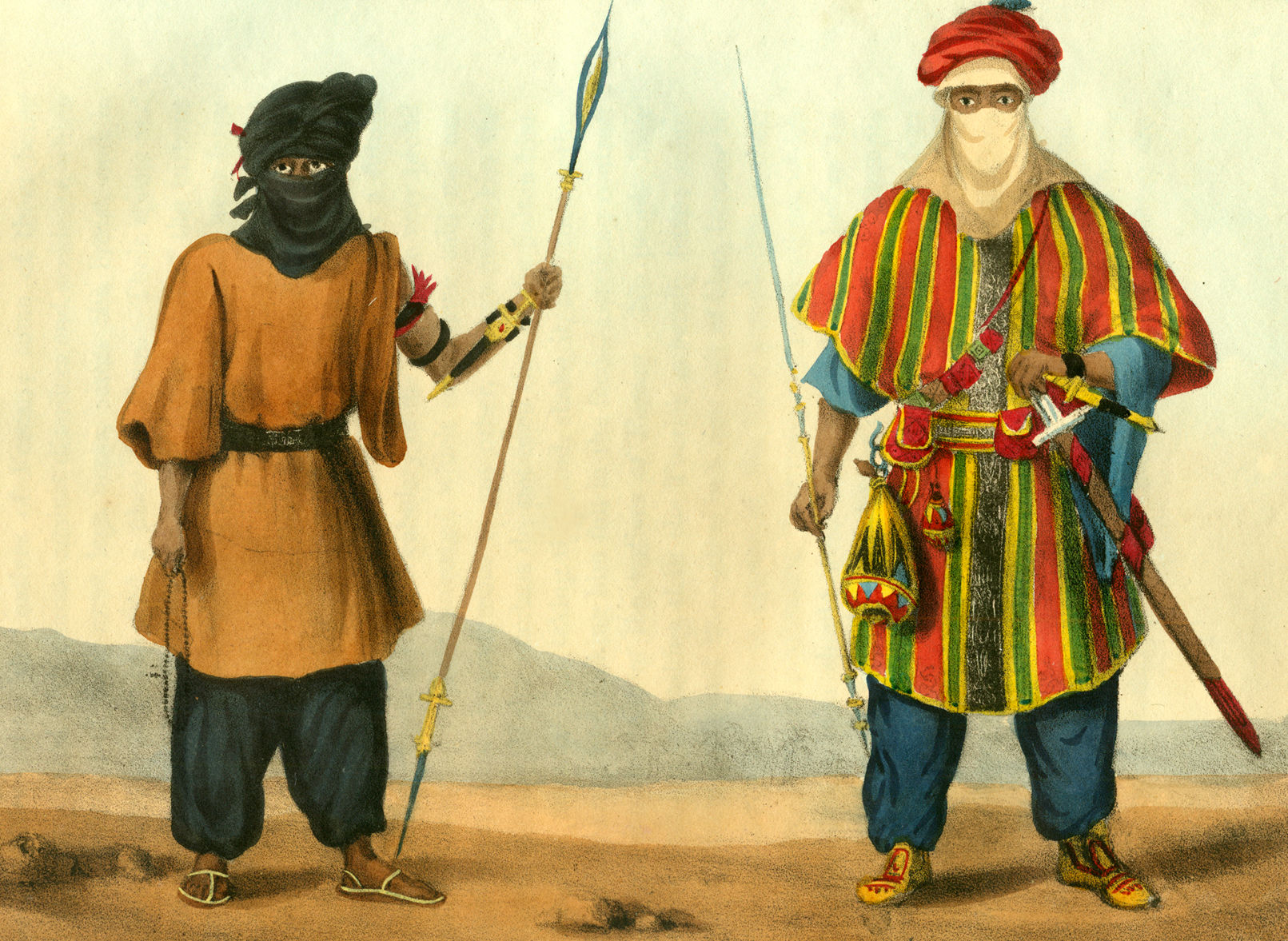
The Tuareg controlled the central Sahara and its trade; by George Francis Lyon, 1821

The spread of Islam to the rest of Africa was linked to trans-Saharan trade. Islam spread via trade routes, and other Africans converting to Islam increased trade and commerce which increased the trade's population.

Historians give many reasons for the spread of Islam facilitating trade. Islam established common values and rules upon which trade was conducted. It created a network of believers who trusted each other and therefore traded with each other even if they did not personally know each other. Such trade networks existed before Islam but on a much smaller scale. The spread of Islam increased the number of nodes in the network and decreased its vulnerability. The use of Arabic as a common language of trade and the increase of literacy through Quranic schools, also facilitated commerce.

Muslim merchants conducting commerce also gradually spread Islam along their trade network. Social interactions with Muslim merchants led many sub-Saharan Africans to convert to Islam, and many merchants married local women and raised their children as Muslims.

Islam spread into Western Sudan by the end of the 10th century, into Chad by the 11th century, and into Hausa lands in 12th and 13th centuries. By 1200, many ruling elites in Western Africa had converted to Islam, and from 1200 to 1500 saw a significant conversion to Islam in the rest of Africa.

== Decline of trade and collapse of West African kingdoms ==
The Portuguese forays along the West African coast opened up avenues for trade between Europe and West Africa. By the early 16th century, European trading bases, the factories established on the coast since 1445, and trade with Europeans became of prime importance to West Africa. North Africa had declined in both political and economic importance, while the Saharan crossing remained long and treacherous. However, the major blow to trans-Saharan trade was the Battle of Tondibi of 1591–92. In a major military expedition organized by the Saadian sultan Ahmad al-Mansur, Morocco sent troops across the Sahara and attacked Timbuktu, Gao and some other important trading centres, destroying buildings and property and exiling prominent citizens. This disruption to trade led to a dramatic decline in the importance of these cities, and the resulting animosity reduced trade considerably.

Although much reduced, trans-Saharan trade continued. But trade routes to the West African coast became increasingly easy, particularly after the French invasion of the Sahel in the 1890s and subsequent construction of railways to the interior. With the independence of nations in the region in the 1960s, the north–south routes were severed by national boundaries. National governments were hostile to Tuareg nationalism and so made few efforts to maintain or support trans-Saharan trade, and the Tuareg rebellion of the 1990s and Algerian Civil War further disrupted these routes, closing many.

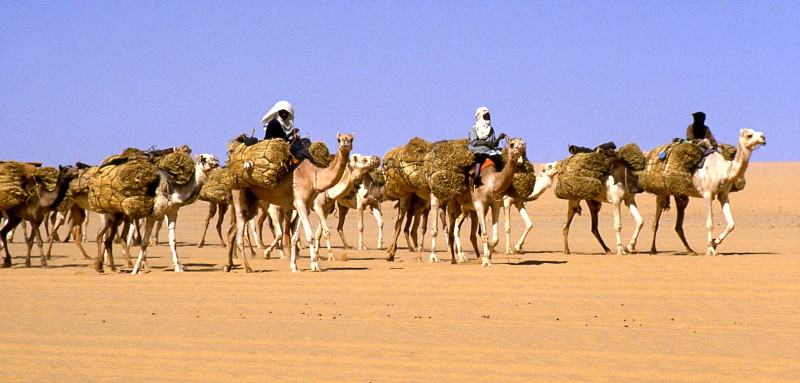
Azalai salt caravan from Agadez to Bilma, 1985

Traditional caravan routes are largely devoid of camels, but the shorter Azalai routes from Agadez to Bilma and Timbuktu to Taoudenni are still regularly—if lightly—used. Some members of the Tuareg still use the traditional trade routes, often traveling 2,400 km (1,500 mi) and six months out of every year by camel across the Sahara, trading in salt carried from the desert interior to communities on the desert edges.

== Present trade ==
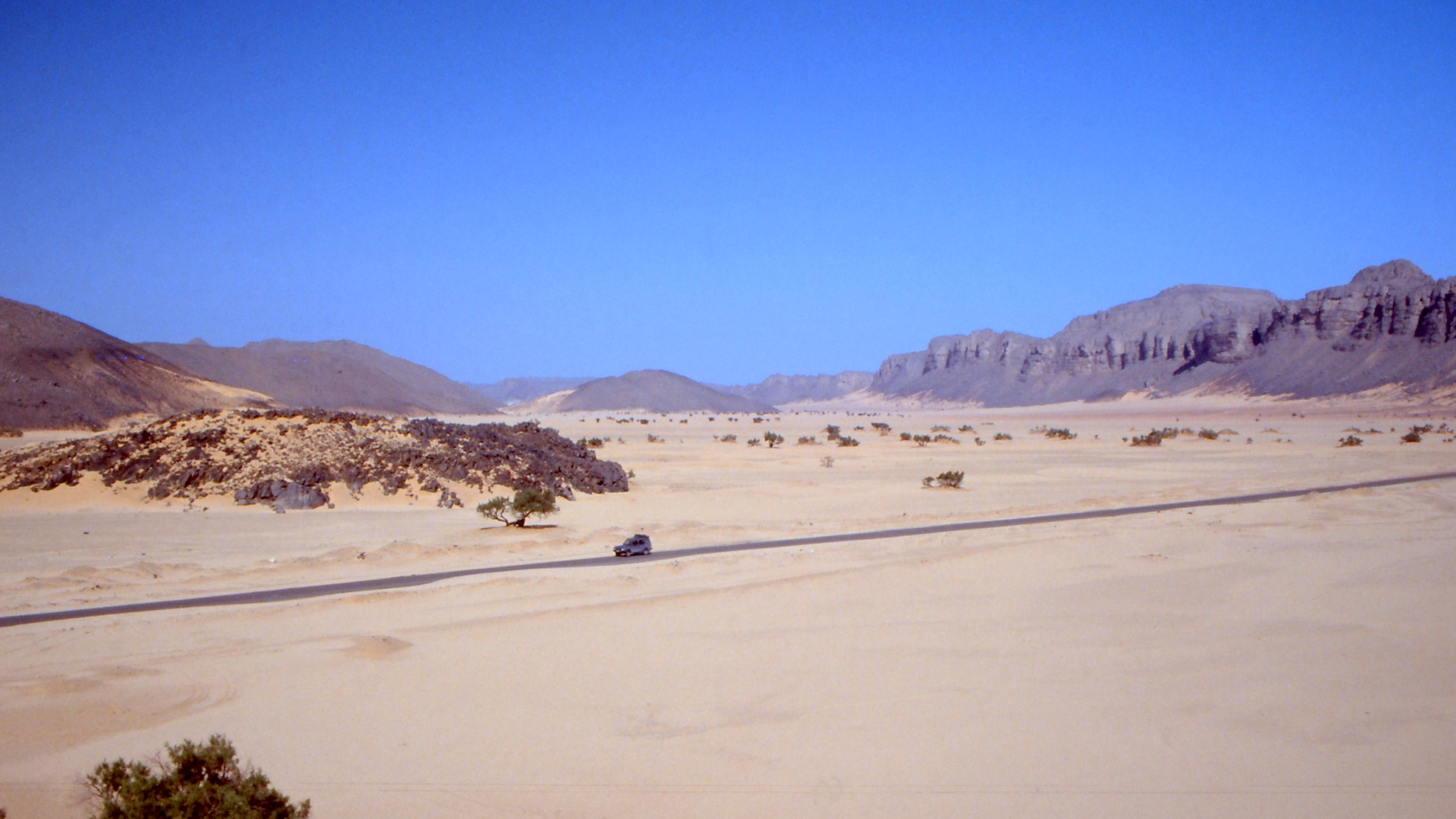
Trans-Sahara Highway in the Algerian Sahara

The African Union and African Development Bank support the Trans-Sahara Highway from Algiers to Lagos via Tamanrasset, to stimulate economic development, and the latter noted an increase in traffic at the border with Chad due to exports to Algeria crossing Niger. The route is paved except for a 120 mi (200 km) section in northern Niger, but border restrictions still hamper traffic. Only a few trucks carry trans-Saharan trade, particularly fuel and salt. Three other highways across the Sahara are proposed. Building the highways is difficult because of sandstorms.
