= Bilma Department =

Coordinates: 18°41′07″N 12°54′59″E

Bilma
- Department
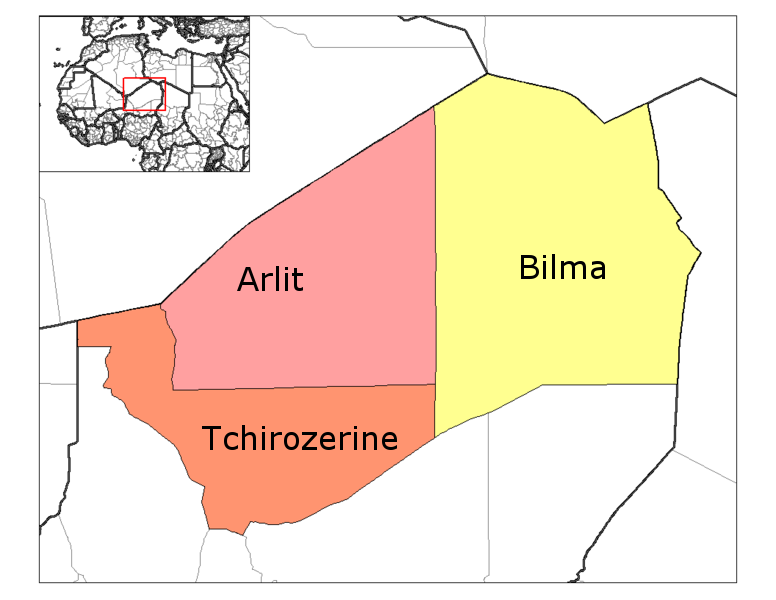
- Bilma Department location in the region
- Country: Niger
- Region: Agadez Region

Area
  - Total: 296,279 km^{2} (114,394 sq mi)

Population (2012 census)
  - Total: 17,935
  - Density: 0.060534/km^{2} (0.15678/sq mi)
- Time zone: UTC+1 (GMT 1)

Bilma is a department of the Agadez Region in Niger. Its capital lies at the city of Bilma. As of 2012, the department had a total population of 17,935 people.

== Communes ==
- Bilma
- Dirkou
- Djado
- Fachi
