= Kaouar =

Valley in Niger

Coordinates: 18°54′N 12°54′E

Designations

Ramsar Wetland
- Official name: Oasis du Kawar
- Designated: 16 September 2005
- Reference no.: 1495

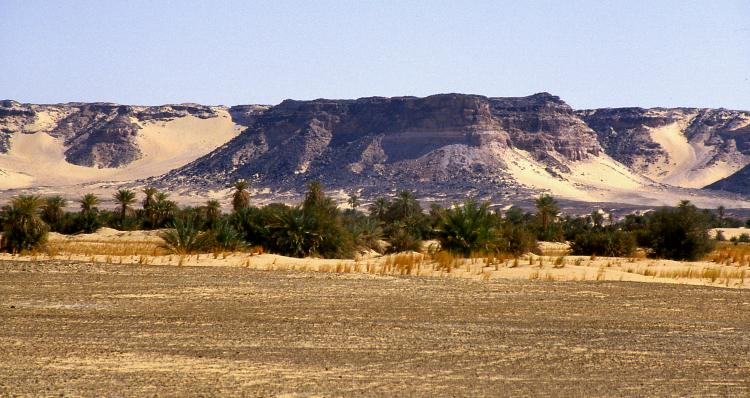
The Kaouar from near Bilma.

The Kaouar (or Kawar) is a series of ten oases in the southern Sahara in northeast Niger, covering about 75 km (50 mi) from north to south, and 1–5 km (0.62–3.11 mi) east to west. They are on the eastern edge of the Ténéré desert, between the Tibesti Mountains in the east and the Aïr Mountains in the west and between the Fezzan in the north and Lake Chad in the south. They lie on the leeward side of a 100-meter-high north–south escarpment and easterly winds striking the escarpment provide easy access to groundwater for the oases.

Running south to north, Bilma, Dirkou, Aney and Séguédine are the largest towns.

The Kaouar oases are famous for salt and date production, and were along the route of the great Bornu to Fezzan caravan trail. This was the major point of contact between the African Sahel and the Mediterranean civilisations until the 19th century. Numerous archeological sites and rock paintings attest to human habitation here reaching back some 10,000 years to when the area was surrounded by lush grasslands.

In 1997, the Kaouar was submitted as a tentative candidate for UNESCO World Heritage Site status as part of The salt route from Air to Kaouar. The oases have been designated as a Ramsar site since 2005.
