= Bilma =

- Commune
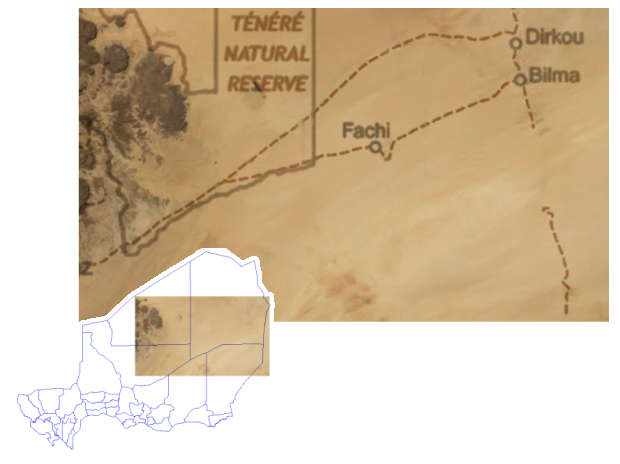

- Location within Niger
- Coordinates: 18°41′12″N 12°55′09″E
- Country: Niger
- Region: Agadez Region
- Department: Bilma Department
- Commune: Bilma
- Elevation: 358 m (1,175 ft)

Population (2012 census)
  - Total: 4,016

Bilma is an oasis town and commune in north east Niger with, as of the 2012 census, a total population of 4,016 people.

It lies protected from the desert dunes under the Kaouar Cliffs and is the largest town along the Kaouar escarpment. It is known for its gardens, for salt and natron production through evaporation ponds, date cultivation, and as the destination of one of the last Saharan caravan routes (the Azalai, from Agadez).

== Population ==
Its population is mostly Kanuri, with smaller Toubou, Tuareg, and Hausa populations, the last being a reminder of Bilma's role as a key stop in the Trans Saharan trade.

== Administration and economy ==
Bilma is the administrative seat of the Bilma Department, covering some 670,000 km^{2} (260,000 sq mi) of north eastern Niger. While it continues to produce salt in large natron salt pans, and this salt is still sold for livestock use throughout west Africa, tourism (based out of Agadez and the Aïr Mountains some 560 km (350 mi) to the west) is of growing importance.

== Climate ==
Bilma features a hot desert climate (Köppen climate classification BWh). The town lies deep in the heart of the Sahara Desert, more precisely in the Ténéré, a hyper-arid desert region lying over northeastern Niger and western Chad, and as such is extremely dry, averaging only 12.7 mm (0.50 in) of measurable precipitation annually. Bilma is also hot during the "winter" months and extremely hot during the summer months and for prolonged periods of time. Average high temperatures in "winter" months surpass 27 °C (81 °F), and exceed 40 °C (104 °F) from April to September inclusively, peaking at 44 °C (111 °F) in June. The record high temperature is 48.2 °C (118.8 °F) on June 23, 2010.

Bilma had the country's lowest ever recorded temperature, −2.4 °C (27.7 °F), on 13 January 1995.

The sunshine duration is extremely high year-round with some 4,000 hours of bright sunshine annually.

Climate data for Bilma, Niger (2006–2010)
Month	Jan	Feb	Mar	Apr	May	Jun	Jul	Aug	Sep	Oct	Nov	Dec	Year
Mean daily maximum °C (°F)	27.7 (81.9)	31.9 (89.4)	35.3 (95.5)	40.6 (105.1)	42.9 (109.2)	44.1 (111.4)	43.0 (109.4)	42.1 (107.8)	41.8 (107.2)	39.1 (102.4)	33.1 (91.6)	28.7 (83.7)	37.5 (99.6)
Daily mean °C (°F)	18.2 (64.8)	21.7 (71.1)	24.9 (76.8)	30.4 (86.7)	33.5 (92.3)	34.7 (94.5)	34.3 (93.7)	34.4 (93.9)	32.7 (90.9)	29.3 (84.7)	22.7 (72.9)	18.5 (65.3)	27.9 (82.3)
Mean daily minimum °C (°F)	8.7 (47.7)	11.4 (52.5)	14.5 (58.1)	20.1 (68.2)	24.1 (75.4)	25.3 (77.5)	25.5 (77.9)	26.6 (79.9)	23.6 (74.5)	19.5 (67.1)	12.2 (54.0)	8.3 (46.9)	18.3 (65.0)
Average precipitation mm (inches)	0.00 (0.00)	0.00 (0.00)	0.00 (0.00)	0.00 (0.00)	0.00 (0.00)	0.00 (0.00)	2.5 (0.10)	7.6 (0.30)	2.5 (0.10)	0.00 (0.00)	0.00 (0.00)	0.00 (0.00)	13 (0.50)
Source: Niger Climatology

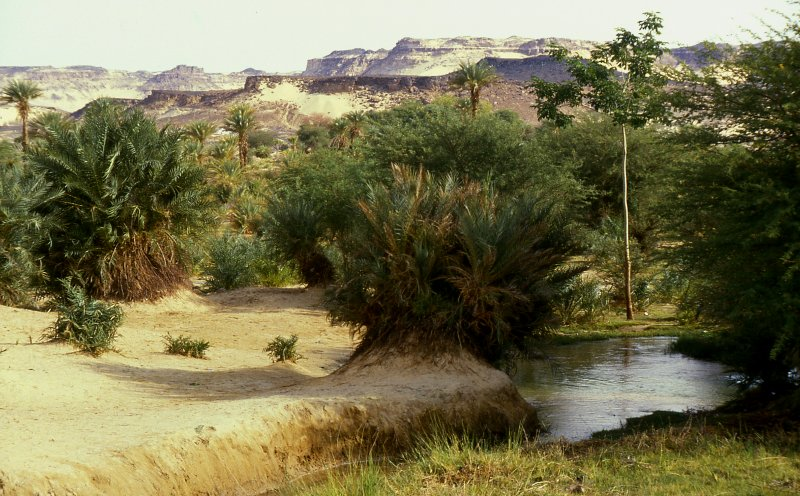
The Oasis at Bilma, with the Kaouar escarpment in the background.

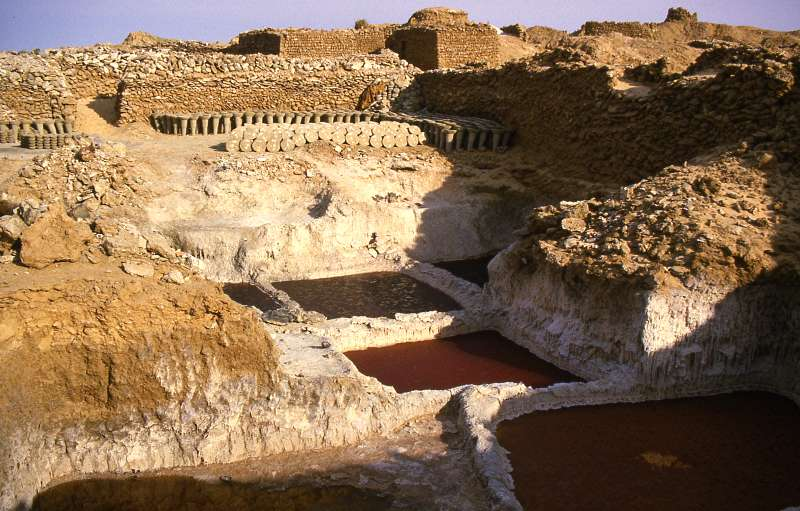
The saline pans at Bilma.

== History ==
The poet Abu Ishaq Ibrahim al-Kanemi was born in Bilma in the 12th century.

During French Colonial rule, Bilma was the site of a major—if isolated—military post at Fort Dromard. After independence, the isolation of Bilma made it the destination for disgraced officials under the authoritarian regime of Seyni Kountché, and a prison was built there by the government. Political leaders were held there in the 1980s, such as Sanoussi Tambari Djakou, today president of the PNA-AL, a Nigerien political party.

In 1989, UTA Flight 772 crashed into the desert near the town after a bomb exploded on board, killing all 170 people aboard.

== Sources ==
- Chisholm, Hugh, ed. (1911). "Bilma" . Encyclopædia Britannica. Vol. 3 (11th ed.). Cambridge University Press.
- Decalo, Samuel (1979). Historical Dictionary of Niger. London and New Jersey: Scarecrow Press. ISBN 0-8108-1229-0.
- Geels, Jolijn (2006). Niger. London: Bradt. ISBN 1-84162-152-8.
