= Argungu Emirate =

Argungu Emirate Kebbi Emirate
- Traditional state
- Location within Nigeria
- Coordinates: 12°44′N 4°31′E
- Country: Nigeria
- State: Kebbi State

Government
  - Sarkin: Samaila Mohammad Mera

The Argungu Emirate, also known as the Kebbi Emirate, is a traditional state based on the town of Argungu in Kebbi State, Nigeria. It is the successor to the ancient Hausa Kingdom of Kebbi. The Emirate is one of four in Kebbi State, the others being the Gwandu Emirate, Yauri Emirate and Zuru Emirate.

== Location ==
The Kebbi emirate is in the northwest of the modern Kebbi State. In earlier times it extended to the south of its original capital of Birnin Kebbi, which is now capital of the Gwandu Emirate and of Kebbi State itself. The landscape is mainly Sudanian Savanna, open woodland with scattered trees. It is intersected by the lowlands of the Rima River, which are seasonally flooded. There is a wet season between May and September, with little rain in the remainder of the year. Mean annual rainfall is about 800 mm. Average temperatures are about 26 °C, ranging from 21 °C in winter to 40 °C between April and June. Kebbi is populated by the Kebbawa, a subgroup of the Hausa.

== History ==
=== Origins ===
Kebbi is traditionally considered to belong to the Banza bakwai states of Hausaland. According to the locally known Hausa legend, the Kebbi kingdom was one of the Banza Bakwai ("seven bastards") or seven "illegitimate" states. The rulers of these states were supposed to trace their lineage to a concubine of the Hausa founding father, Bayajidda, hence the locally disdainful term banza ("illegitimate").

The first historical references date to the time when the area came under Songhay rule during the reign of Sunni Ali (1464–1492). The earliest documented mention of a Kebbi ruler is to be found in Al-Sa'di's Ta'rïkh al-Südän where it is related that in the year 1516-7 Kanta Kuta, ruler of Leka, revolted against the Dendi-fari ("governor of the eastern front"), a provincial governor of the Songhay empire and established his independence which lasted until the downfall of the Songhay empire. The reason for Kebbi's break with Songhay was the refusal of the Dendi-fari to give the Kanta his share of the booty obtained in an expedition against the Sultanate of Air. In the year 1517–8, an attempt was made by Songhay to re-establish its authority over Kebbi, but was unsuccessful. Kuta was succeeded, probably in 1523-4 by Muhammad Kanta and it was under him that Kebbi emerged as a formidable power in the Central Sudan. Sudan. During the reign of the Songhay Askia Muhammad Bunkan, the Kanta was able to inflict a crushing defeat on Songhay, the Askia's army was scattered 'pell-mell' and Muhammad Bunkan was fortunate to get away with his life. The Al-Sa'di's Ta'rïkh al-Südän, which records this incident, says that no other Askia again attempted an expedition against Kebbi. During this period Surame, of which the massive walls still survive, was the capital of the kingdom.

Kebbi became a major power in the region, resisting Songhay attacks, expanding into the Yauri and Nupe lands to the south and defeating attempts by the Bornu Empire to invade and occupy the Hausa states. However, after Kanta's death in 1556 the Hausa states stopped paying tribute, and his son and successor Ahmadu did not attempt to force the issue. By the end of the sixteenth century Kebbi had become a minor kingdom.

=== Struggle against the Fulani Jihadists ===
During the Fulani jihad, in 1808 Abdullahi dan Fodio (c. 1766–1828), the younger brother of Shaihu Usman dan Fodio, defeated the forces of Kebbi. He became ruler of the Gwandu Emirate, which dominated the northeast of the Sokoto Caliphate. The Sarkin Kebbi, Muhammadu Hodi, was driven from his capital and replaced by a puppet ruler, Usuman Masa. However, the Kebbawa continued to resist, and Abdullahi was unable to complete the conquest. Muhammadu Hodi fought on in the Zamfara Valley, and his successor Karari in Argungu and Zazzagawa. On Karari's death in 1831, his son Yakubu Nabame surrendered, and for 16 years lived in exile in Sokoto until Sultan Aliyu Babba allowed him to return to Argungu as a vassal of the Caliphate.

In 1849 Yakubu renounced his allegiance and proclaimed himself Sarkin Kebbi. After see-saw battles, including at one time a siege of Argungu by Sokoto forces, Sultan Aliyu of Sokoto effectively recognized the independence of the Kebbi Emirate based in Argungu. However the Sokoto government effectively controlled Kebbi politics and it acted as a puppet state. Kebbi now formed a hostile wedge between Sokoto and Gwandu, and sporadic warfare continued for the next fifty years. In 1859 Yakubu's brother and successor Yusufu Mainasara was killed in battle in the dried out floodplain of the Rima River. In 1860 the Emir of Gwandu, Haliru, was killed in battle at Karakara. In 1867 the Fulani recognized the independence of Kebbi in a formal treaty. In 1875 war broke out again when the people of Fanna in the lower Rima valley decided to transfer their allegiance to Gwandu. Sarkin Kebbi Sama'ila achieved a string of successes against Gwandu between 1883 and 1903, with some severe setbacks, until the establishment of the British protectorate of Northern Nigeria finally ended the fighting.

=== Colonial occupation ===
On 5 August 1890 the British and French concluded an agreement to divide West Africa between the two colonial powers. Under this agreement, Britain would acquire all territories up to and including the Sokoto Caliphate, while the French would take the lands further to the north. The people of the region were not consulted. The Frenchman Parfait-Louis Monteil was given charge of an expedition to discover the northern limits of the Sokoto caliphate. Reaching Argungu in the summer of 1891, he found that the emirate was independent of Sokoto, although it was to be defeated by Sokoto in March 1892 and forced to once again become a subject state. Monteil also found little evidence of the presence claimed in the region by the British Royal Niger Company, apart from a few commercial depots in Gwandu.

When the British heard of Monteil's report, and then heard that the French had raised their flag in Argungu, they dispatched troops to Argungu in 1898, where they found no French presence. The British established a permanent force in Argungu in 1902 to provide protection to French caravans crossing the British zone by agreement, and then to protect the boundary commission that was delimiting the boundary between the French and British spheres. On hearing word that the Sultan of Sokoto was gathering his forces, this force and others were dispatched to Sokoto where after some fighting they achieved a decisive victory. Sarkin Sama had welcomed the British for political reasons, since under the British system of indirect rule he was able to regain and consolidate his power.

By 1908, British power was unquestioned. At a durbar held in 1908 for the colonial governor Frederick Lugard, the emirs of Kebbi and Gwandu and the Sultan of Sokoto turned out in force, with a show of fifteen thousand horsemen and camels. The Emirs gave Lugard sixteen ponies as tribute, and prostrated themselves before him. The British established a system where the emirs were given large administrative authority subject to the direction of District Officers. The Argungu posting was not sought after. The mosquitoes were so bad that the D.O. had to sleep in a specially constructed mosquito cage.

== Emirate today ==
=== Fishing festival ===
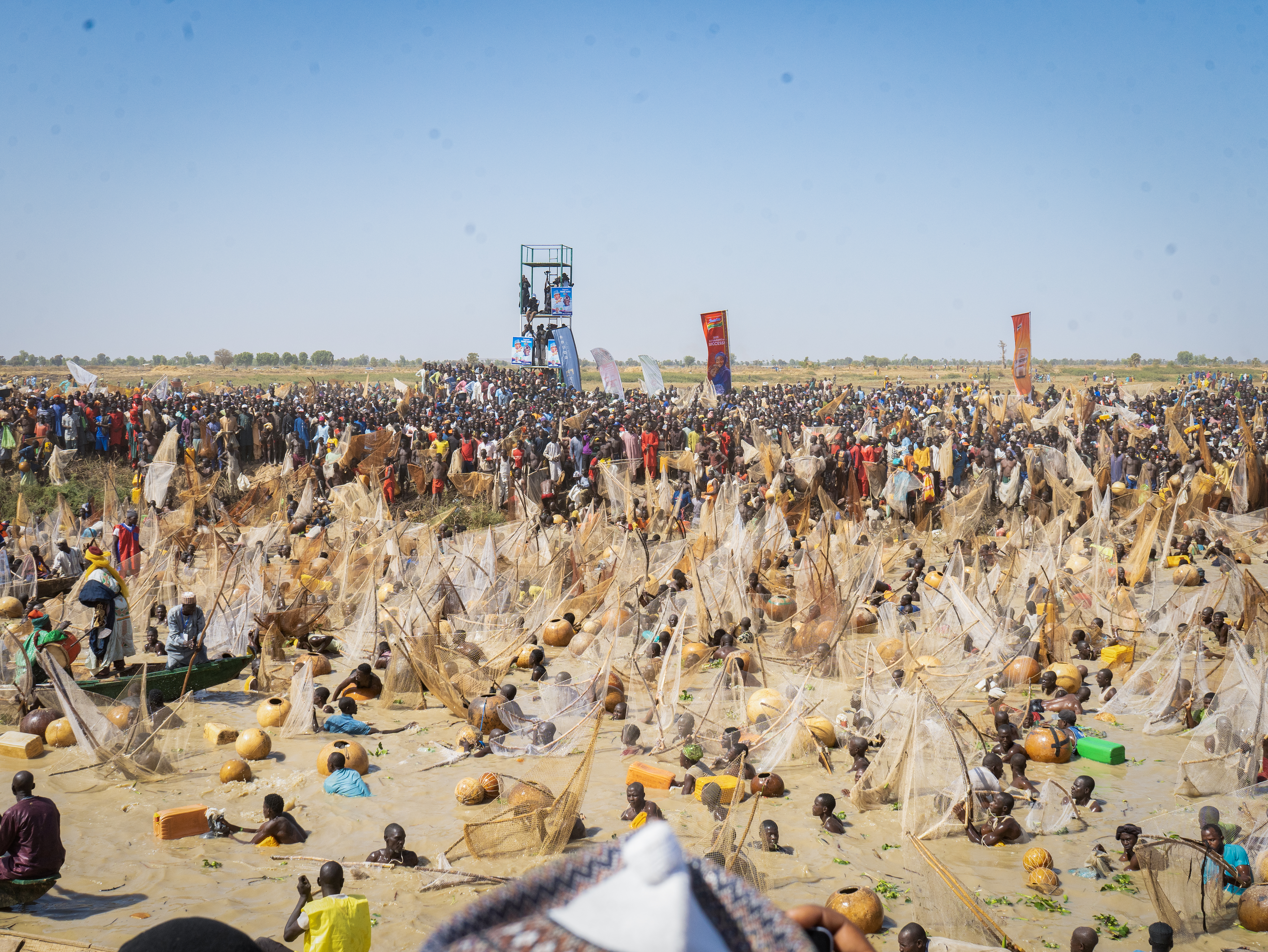
61st Argungu fishing and cultural festival 2026

is one of the largest cultural events in northern Nigeria.

The Festival has a long history. It was first staged when the Sultan of Sokoto, Hassan Dan Mu'azu, visited the Argungu Emirate in 1934, and was held to display the fishing ability of the Kabawas by the Emir Muhammed Sama. Until the 1960s the festival was a local affair, but in 1972 it was attended by the Nigerian Head of State, General Yakubu Gowon and his counterpart from Niger, Hamani Diori. For political reasons, the festival lost support and no festival was staged from 1999 until 2004. The festival has now been revived and is becoming a major tourist attraction.

By 2009, the renamed Argungu International and Cultural Festival included a grand durbar with 500 well-decorated horses and their riders, and 120 well decorated camels and their riders, led by the flag bearer of the Argungu Emirate and including participants from many other ethnic groups. The largest fish weighed 55 kg, and the prizes for this catch were presented at a ceremony attended by President Umaru Musa Yar'Adua, his wife, six governors and many traditional rulers. The 2009 festival also included water sports, archery and catapulting competitions, a motor rally, performances by dance troupes from Niger, Mali, Chad and Benin, wrestling and boxing matches, and an agricultural fair. The importance of the festival to the economy has led the government to conserve fish stock by prohibiting use of gill nets and cast nets.

=== Irrigation plan ===
The Zauro polder project was conceived in 1969 and long delayed, but seemed likely to be started in 2009. The project would irrigate 10,572 hectares of farmland in the floodplain of the Rima River between Argungu and Birnin Kebbi. Crops would include rice, maize, wheat, barley and vegetables such as cow peas, onions, tomatoes, sweet potatoes and Irish potatoes. The dam would also benefit the fishing industry, important in the state. The project promises significant benefits but is controversial, since it would change land use patterns, displace some communities and flood the site of the annual fishing festival. The Emir of Argungu has been stoned in protests over the project.

=== Museum ===
In June 2009 Argungu Emirate presented a proposal to the National Commission for Museums and Monuments to give the historic Surame site a World Heritage listing. Surame was the first capital of the Kebbi Kingdom, founded by Mohammadu Kanta Kotal. Senator Umaru Abubakar Argungu also asked for help make the Kanta Museum not only a national monument but a historical cultural resource for the World Heritage List. The museum building, adjacent to the main market was built in 1831 by Yakubu Nabame and served as the Emir's palace until 1942, when the British built a new administrative palace during the reign of Muhammed Sani. On 1 July 1958, it opened as a museum, offering an insight into the turbulent history of Kebbi State. The museum has a notable collection of weapons, consisting of charms, spears, swords, wood, stones, bows and arrows, local guns and even drums on display. The museum is also known to be a place where dead emirs of the local government are buried.

== Rulers ==
Rulers of the Hausa kingdom before incorporation into the Sokoto Caliphate:

Great Hausa kingdom based on Surame and Birnin Kebbi
No.	Name	Reign start	Reign end
1	Muhammadu Kantu Kotal	1516	1561
2	Ahmadu I	1561	1596
3	Dawuda	1596	1619
4	Ibrahimu I	1619	1621
5	Suleimanu I	1621	1636
6	Muhammadu	1636	1649
7	Maliki dan Ibrahimu	1649	1662
8	Umarau Ciwa	1662	1674
9	Muhammadu Kaye	1674	1676
10	Ibrahimu II	1676	1684
11	Muhammadu na Sifawa	1684	1686
12	Ahmadu dan Amaru	1686	1696
13	Tomo	1696	1700
14	Muhammadu dan Giwa	1700	1717
15	Samaila	1717	1750
16	Muhammadu dan Tagande	1750	1754
17	Abdullahi Toga	1754	1775
18	Suleimanu II	1775	1803
19	Abubakar Ukar	1803	
20	Muhammadu Fodi	1803	1826
21	Samaila II	1826	1827

Rulers of the Hausa Emirate established at Argungu:

Hausa successor state based on Argungu
No.	Name	Reign start	Reign end	Notes
21	Samaila (or Karari)	1827	1831	lead a heavy resistance against Gwandu. Was killed at Galewa
22	Yakubu Nabame (in exile from 1831 to 1849)	1831	1854	son of Samaila. Captured several towns before being killed by an arrow at Kibiari
23	Yusufu Mainasara	1854	1859	son of Samaila. Was killed by Haliru, Emir of Gwandu
24	Muhammadu Ba Are	1859	1860	son of Yakubu. Avenged his uncle's death before he was killed
25	Abdullahi Toga	1860	1883	son of Samaila
26	Samaila II (or Sama)	1883	September 1915	son of Yakubu. A great warrior who was known to have burnt 90 Fulani towns
27	Suleimana	1915	1920	son of Yakubu
28	Muhammadu Sama	1920	1934	son of Samaila II
29	Muhammadu Sani	1934	1942	son of Muhammadu Sama
30	Samaila III	1942	1953	a descendant of Muhammadu Dan Giwa (r. 1700–1717), Sarkin Kebbi
31	Muhammadu Shefe	1953	October 1959	son of Samaila III. Abdicated following a disagreement with his council
32	Muhammadu Mera	1959	1996	son of Muhammadu Sani
33	Samaila IV CON	1996	Incumbent	son of Muhammadu Mera

=== Family tree ===
Family of Argungu Emirate

1 Muhammadu Kanta r. 1515–1561
2 Ahmadu r. 1561–1596	4 Ibrahim r. 1619–1621	6 Muhammadu r. 1636–1649	Kanna
3 Dawuda r. 1596–1619	8 Umaru Giwa r. 1662–1674	7 Maliki r. 1649–1662	13; Tomo r. 1696–1700	12; Ahmadu r. 1686–1696
5 Suleimana r. 1621–1636	11; Muhammadu Na Sifawa r. 1684–1686	14; Muhammadu Dan Giwa r. 1700–1717
9 Muhammadu Kaye r. 1621–1636	15; Sumaila Ta-Gandu r. 1684–1686	Yerima
10; Ibrahim r. 1676–1684	16; Muhammadu Dan Ta-Gandu r. 1750–1754	17; Abdullahi Toga r. 1754–1775	Aliyu
18; Suleimana r. 1775–1803	Usumanu
19; Abubakar Ukar r. 1803	20; Muhammadu Hodi r. 1803–1826	21; Samaila (First Emir of Argungu) r. 1826–1831	Buben Shiko
22; Yakubu Nabame r. 1849–1854	23; Yusufu Mainassara r. 1854–1859	25; Abdullahi Toga r. 1860–1883	Mudi
24; Muhammadu Ba Are r. 1859–1860	26; Samaila II r. 1883–1915	27; Suleimana r. 1915–1920	30; Samaila III r. 1942–1953
28; Muhammadu Sama r. 1920–1934
29; Muhammadu Sani r. 1934–1942	31; Muhammadu Shefe r. 1953–1959
32; Muhammadu Mera r. 1959–1996
33; Samaila IV r. 1996–

== Bibliography ==
- Harris, P. G.: Sokoto Provincial Gazetteer, Sokoto 1938 [Cyclostyled].
- Hogben, S. J. and A. H. M. Kirk-Greene: The Emirates of Northern Nigeria, London 1966.
- Johnston, H. A. S., The Fulani Empire of Sokoto, Oxford 1967 (pp. 187–195).
