= Alwassa–Gwandu campaign =

Two-part military confrontation fought in the jihad of Usman dan Fodio

- Part of the Jihad of Usman dan Fodio
Date	November 1805 (6 days)
Location	Valley of the Sokoto River, western Hausaland 12°30′8″N 4°38′33″E
Result	Coalition victory at Alwassa; Jihadist victory at Gwandu

Belligerents
Sokoto jihadists	Gobir; Kebbi; Zamfarawa rebels; Tuareg groups; Contingents from other Hausa states

Commanders and leaders
Waziri Abdullahi dan Fodio; Sarkin Yaki Ali Jedo; Muhammed Bello	Sarkin Gobir Yunfa; Sarkin Kebbi Muhammadu Hodi; Tambari Agunbulu of Adar; Usman Massa

Units involved
Archers; Cavalry	Heavy cavalry; Tuareg camel corps

Casualties and losses
1,000+ killed (at Alwassa)	Unknown
- Location within Nigeria

The Alwassa–Gwandu campaign was a two-part military confrontation in November 1805 during the Jihad of Usman dan Fodio in present-day northwestern Nigeria. It was fought between the Sokoto jihadists, led by Abdullahi dan Fodio, Ali Jedo, and Muhammad Bello, and a broad coalition of Gobir, Kebbi, Zamfara, and allied Tuareg groups under Yunfa, Muhammadu Hodi, and the Tuareg chief Agunbulu.

The campaign opened with a battle at Alwassa, where the coalition decisively defeated the jihadists, inflicting heavy casualties. The jihadists retreated to their base at Gwandu, where they spent the next four days defending the lightly fortified town with the aid of the surrounding terrain. On the final day, a Thursday, the coalition launched a major assault, which failed due to the jihadists' effective use of archers and cavalry. Despite the jihadists narrowly avoiding complete annihilation, after the campaign, they immediately set out to consolidate their authority in western Hausaland, and gradually extended their influence over the entire region.

== Background ==
Following their defeat at Tsuntsua by Gobir in 1804, the Sokoto jihadists moved into the Zamfara valley in search of food, establishing a camp at Sabon Gari (twenty miles north of Anka) in southwestern Zamfara. Recognising the need for a more permanent base, the leader of the jihad, Usman dan Fodio, ordered an expedition into the Kebbi Kingdom. Under Waziri (vizier) Abdullahi dan Fodio and Sarkin Yaki ("chief of war") Ali Jedo, Birnin Kebbi, the Kebbi capital, was captured and plundered. Sarkin Kebbi Muhammadu Hodi fled north to join the Gobirawa against the jihadists. In his place, the jihadists appointed Usman Massa, a Kebbi prince, as Emir over the conquered southern territories of the kingdom.

While the Kebbi campaign was ongoing, Usman's son Muhammad Bello led an expedition against the Zamfarawa. The initially friendly Zamfara population soon turned hostile to Usman's community because, according to Bello, "our people were oppressing them. They thought that by oppression they would gain their ends but the Zamfarawa resented it and our cause was injured." Bello's force marched to the walls of Garmai. After a failed negotiation with the Sarkin Zamfara Abarshi, in which Bello "begged him to help us and not to help our enemies," the jihadists sacked Garmai along with fifty other towns and laid waste to the surrounding countryside.

With these two successful campaigns complete, Usman's community moved south in October 1805 to the Kebbi town of Gwandu. Meanwhile, with the harvest largely in and the cure salée of the Tuareg over, Sarkin Gobir Yunfa was forming a coalition against the jihadists with the Kebbawa in the north under their ousted sarki Hodi, as well as allied Tuareg groups led by their chief Agunbulu. Other Hausa groups also joined this coalition, including dissidents from the Zamfara towns which Bello had devastated, and contingents from other Hausa states.

== Battle of Alwassa ==
News of the approaching army unusually reached the jihadists late, and they were caught unprepared. One detachment under Bello was in the middle of a siege against the Kebbi town of Augi (near Gwandu) when word arrived, forcing them to retreat quickly to Gwandu. In previous engagements the jihadists had often taken the offensive even when outnumbered. On this occasion, however, their leaders were divided on strategy. Sarkin Yaki Ali Jedo favoured meeting the coalition head on in a pitched battle, while another faction, led by Bello, preferred a defensive strategy. After debate, Jedo's faction prevailed, and it was decided that the army would be jointly led by Abdullahi and Jedo. At this point Bello chose not to continue due to illness, but he was pressed by Usman to rejoin "lest if they were defeated it should be said that by staying behind I had caused others to hang back."

When Bello resumed command, another council of war was held. Abdullahi now joined Bello in calling for a withdrawal, but Jedo again insisted on taking the offensive. The army's movements which advanced, fell back, and then advanced again, caused by disagreements among the commanders, seemed to have affected both discipline and morale. While encamped at the friendly village of Kwolda, the troops plundered the settlement. According to Bello's account: "Now this town was not at war with us and indeed half the inhabitants were our own people. Yet our warriors attacked them and plundered them of all they had. The Waziri Abdullahi ordered them to stop but they refused to obey him. Then I too went into the town to prevent more plundering but I came near to being killed and was forced to withdraw." Despite both Abdullahi and Bello again calling for a withdrawal, the army marched on.

The two armies eventually met in the dry fadama (irrigated lowlands) at Alwassa (about twenty miles west of Gwandu) on a Saturday in November 1805/Sha'ban 1220. Though greatly outnumbered, the jihadists were better equipped than they had been in previous battles, owing to their recent campaigns, where they plundered weapons, mail, quilted armour (lafidi) and horses. Despite this, however, they still heavily relied on their bowmen.

Early in the fighting, the left wing of the jihadist force collapsed under the onslaught of the camel mounted army of the Tuaregs and their entire line of battle was rolled up. The commanders were unable to rally their troops, and the jihadist army broke and retreated to Gwandu. According to Bello, over a thousand of the jihadists were killed at Alwassa.

== Battle of Gwandu ==
At Gwandu, located in a hollow surrounded by low, flat-topped hills of bronze and purple laterite, the demoralised jihadists spent four days defending the lightly fortified town. At this point, the jihadist-appointed Emir of Kebbi, Usman Massa, abandoned his allegiance and joined the coalition outside Gwandu. On the following Thursday, the coalition launched a major assault. Up until then, much of the fighting had consisted of cavalry patrols probing towards the town, countered by Bello with defensive patrols. To rally the demoralised troops, Usman sought to restore morale through prayers and exhortation. Bello recounts: "Shehu came out from the mosque and preached to the people. With loving-kindness he exhorted them to forsake evil-doing and turn into the paths of righteousness. He prayed for victory and his words made them eager to fight again."

Despite Gwandu's lack of walls or strong fortifications, the stony plateaux and steep escarpments around the town made movement difficult for the coalition cavalry, giving an advantage to the jihadist bowmen. The coalition attempted a pincer movement, with one column striking from the front while another attacked from the rear, and a third advanced from the north to reinforce the frontal assault. As the jihadists slowly withdrew toward the town, they drew the coalition into the range of their archers' volleys. When the coalition cavalry eventually broke under the pressure, the jihadist horsemen charged their flank and rolled it up. The coalition force retreated in disorder, with survivors fleeing to the base of Usman Massa at Gumbai near Gwandu, where Bello's cavalry again scattered them.

The coalition captives were stoned by the women of Gwandu, and then cast out in the sun to die of thirst.

== Aftermath ==
After nearly avoiding complete annihilation, the jihadists immediately set out to reassert their authority in western Hausaland. They managed to suppress the Zamfarawa and Kebbawa rebels, with the turncoat Usman Massa killed by the end of 1806. Soon after the Alwassa–Gwandu campaign, Usman sent Bello to represent him at a meeting of Muslim leaders at Magami. Through Bello's diplomacy at the meeting, the jihadists were able to obtain the loyalty of some of the Hausa kingdoms. According to historian Murray Last: "From this time, then (dry season 1805-1806), the hegemony of Sokoto begins: no longer is the caliphate recognized only by the Emigrants (Muhajirun) and those fighting in the Sokoto jihād, but the Muslims in Zamfara, Katsina, Daura and Kano now are formally included in the wider Community."

Before Alwassa, the jihadists had already suffered heavy losses, many of them respected scholars. The defeat at Tsuntsua was especially distressing, with 200 of the over 2000 killed said to have memorised the Qur'an. As a result, the ranks of the jihadist army were increasingly filled by adventurers who, drawn by earlier successes, joined in hopes of gain. These "rabble of young hooligans," according to Abdullahi, were accused of carrying out the plundering at Kwaldo. Surveying the aftermath of Alwassa, Abdullahi began doubting the motivations behind the jihadist fighters, and lamenting: "I have been left among a remnant who neglect their prayers. And obey, in procuring pleasures, their own souls. And the majority of them have traded their faith for the world... They do not listen to orders, they disobey their imam." He contrasted them "to my friends who died in the Jihad at Tsuntsuwa, Kirare and Alwasa. All of them knew the Qur'an by heart, all were teachers, all were hospitable, all were courageous, all were pillars of religion." Abdullahi later abandoned the jihad in 1807 and set out for Mecca, but was eventually turned back at Kano.
