= Goulbi de Maradi River =

River in Niger and Nigeria

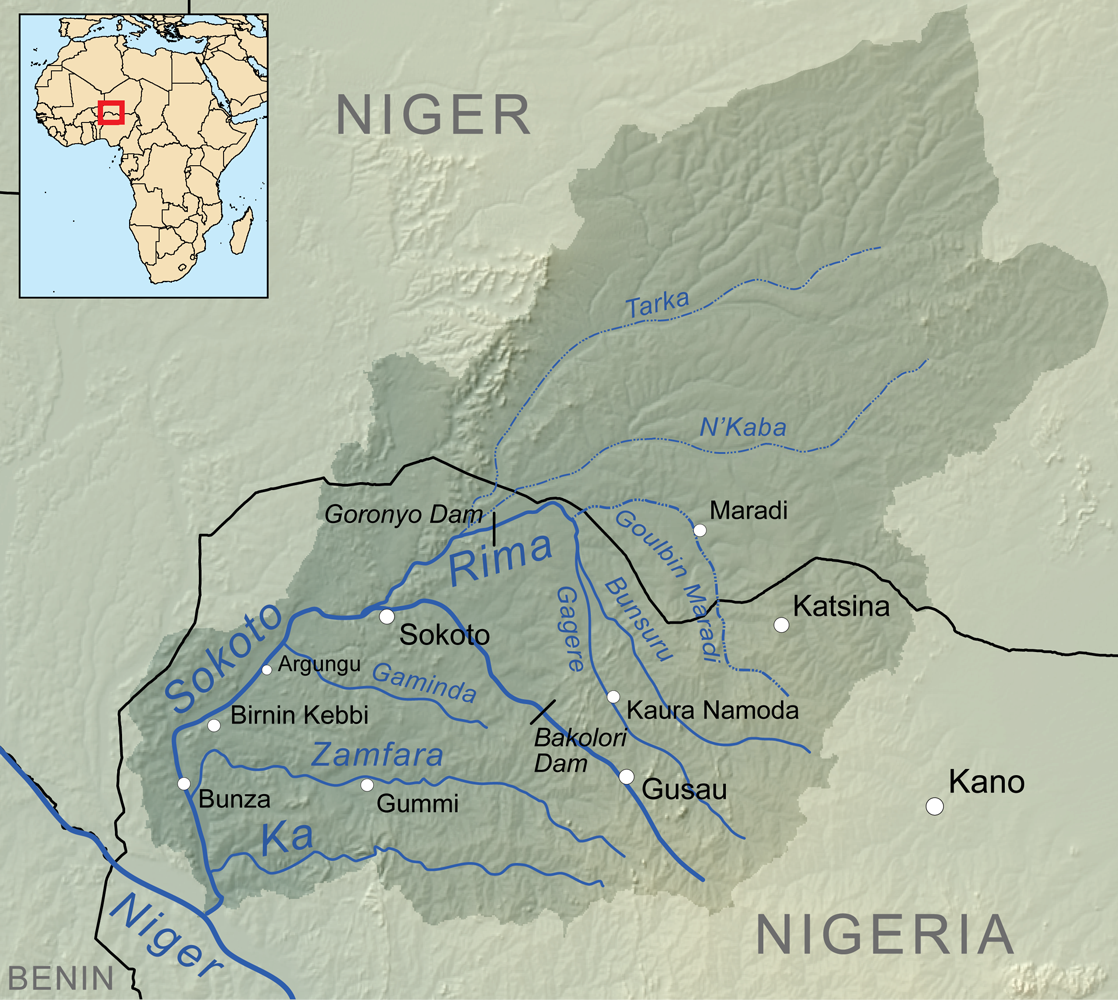
Map of the Sokoto River drainage basin

The Goulbi de Maradi is a river in south central Niger and north central Nigeria. Between its source near Katsina in Nigeria, and its end in the Rima River, the Goulbi de Maradi never flows more than 48 kilometres (30 mi) from the Niger–Nigeria border. Though important for agriculture and pastoralism, and flowing through the Niger cities of Maradi, Guidan Roumdji, and Madarounfa, the Goulbi de Maradi is a seasonal river and flows only during the rainy season.

== Description ==
The northern region of Nigeria contains the Rima River. The Goulbi de Maradi river joins it at its most northern point. Running southwest, it merges with the Sokoto River close to Sokoto before heading south to the Niger River. Only during the wet season does the upper Rima River flow.A significant irrigation project called the Zauro polder project has been in the works for many years. In the Rima floodplain between Argungu and Birnin Kebbi, it would irrigate 10,572 ha (105.72 km^{2}; 40.82 sq mi) of agricultural land.
