= Kanta Museum =

Museum in Nigeria

- Gidan Yakubu Nabame
- Established: 1831
- Location: Argungu, Kebbi State, Nigeria
- Founder: Yakubu Nabame

Kanta Museum is a museum in Argungu, Nigeria, adjacent to the main market.

Built in 1831, the building was named after Muhammed Kanta, who founded the Kebbi Kingdom in 1515. It was erected by Yakubu Nabame, a former Emir of Kebbi, and served as the Emir's palace until 1942 when the British built a new administrative palace during the reign of Muhammed Sani. After the building became vacant, on July 1, 1958, it opened as a museum, offering an insight into the turbulent history of Kebbi State.

The museum is divided into eleven compartments and has a notable collection of weapons, consisting of charms, spears, swords, wood, stones, bows and arrows, local guns and even drums on display.
