= Kagara, Sokoto State =

Kagara
- Village
- Location in Nigeria
- Coordinates: 13°23′35″N 5°35′59″E
- Country: Nigeria
- State: Sokoto State
- LGA: Goronyo
- Time zone: UTC+1 (WAT)
- 3-digit postal code prefix: 922

Kagara is a community in Sokoto State, Nigeria, near Goronyo town. Kagara lies on the southern edge of the Sahel, an arid belt of land to the south of the Sahara desert. The village is downstream from the Goronyo Dam on the Rima River. In the 2010 rainy season, a violent storm forced massive release of water to prevent the dam bursting. The flood that followed wrecked most of the houses in Kagara and destroyed almost all crops. Later the dam did in fact break, causing much more widespread flooding.
