= Goronyo Dam =

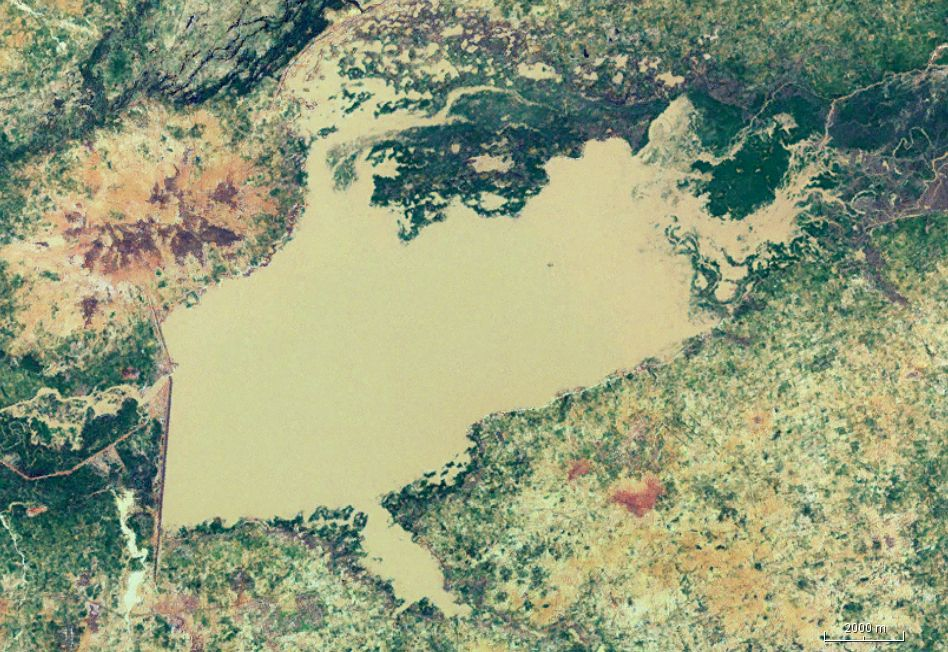
- The Goronyo Reservoir
- Interactive map of Goronyo Dam
- Location: Sokoto State, Nigeria
- Coordinates: 13°31′50″N 05°52′56″E
- Opening date: 1992

Dam and spillways
- Impounds: Rima River
- Height: 21 m (69 ft)
- Length: 12.5 km (7.8 mi)

Reservoir
- Total capacity: 976 million m^{3}

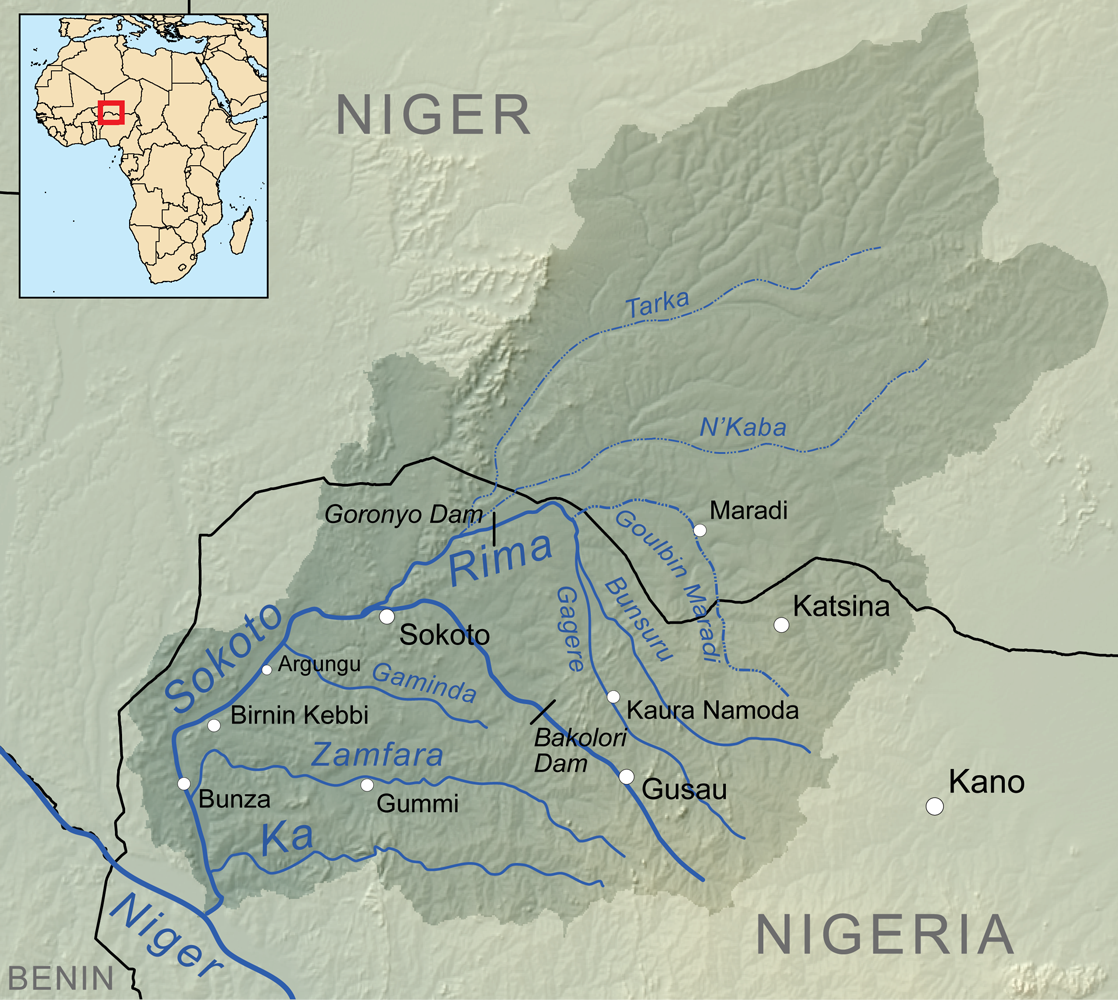
Sokoto river basin showing location of the dam on the Rima River

The Goronyo Dam impounds the Rima River in Goronyo local government area of Sokoto State in the northern Nigeria. It was completed in 1984 and commissioned in 1992. The dam is a sand-fill structure with a height of 21 m (69 ft) and a total length of 12.5 km. It has a storage capacity of 976 million cubic meters. The dam will be important in controlling floods and releasing water in the dry season for the planned Zauro polder project downstream in Kebbi State.

In August 2009, Governor Aliyu Magatakarda Wamakko urged the Federal Government to hasten completion of the irrigation project. The Minority Leader of the Sokoto State House of Assembly, Alhaji Bello Goronyo, said that N4 billion was needed to complete canalisation, but only about N600 million was provided in the 2009 budget.

In late August 2010, rainstorms caused the dam to fill to dangerous levels. In an attempt to reduce the risk of failure, the gates were opened on 1 September 2010, causing major flooding in the downstream village of Kagara. On 8 September, the spillway from the dam completely failed, causing much more widespread flooding. The storm that caused the flooding may be part of a climate change pattern, with rising temperatures and more intense rainfall in the rainy season.
