= Muhammadu Hodi =

Ruler of Kebbi from 1803 to 1826

Muhammadu Kanta
- Sarkin Kebbi

King of Kebbi
- Reign: 1803–1826
- Predecessor: Umar Ukar
- Successor: Samaila II (de jure); Usman Massa (de facto)
- Died: 1826
- Issue: Jibril of Kebbe Muhammadu Usman
- Dynasty: Lekawa
- Father: Suleimana

Muhammadu Hodi dan Suleimana (died 1826), also known as Muhammadu Fodi, was a ruler of the Hausa kingdom of Kebbi, from 1803 to 1826. He became Sarkin Kebbi (king of Kebbi) after seizing from his younger brother Umar Ukar in 1803. Two years later, the jihadists of Sokoto besieged and captured his capital, Birnin Kebbi. Hodi escaped and, for the remainder of his reign, he remained the leading figure in Kebbi's resistance against the Sokoto jihadists. After his death in 1826, his brother Samaila established the Argungu Emirate as the new center of Kebbi resistance.

== Life ==
Muhammadu Hodi was the son of Sarkin Kebbi (king of Kebbi) Suleimana, who reigned from 1775 to 1803.

When Suleimana died, the council of electors chose his son Umar Ukar as ruler. Suleimana had nominated Ukar as his successor, just as he had been nominated by his father Abdullahi Toga (r. 1754–1775), who started the practice. Ukar reigned for only four days before he was murdered by his elder brother Hodi. After defeating Moli, the Kokani of Kebbi, Hodi seized the throne and was acknowledged as Sarkin Kebbi (King of Kebbi).

Two years into Hodi's reign, the jihadists of Sokoto under Abdullahi dan Fodio besieged and sacked his capital, Birnin Kebbi, on 12 April 1805. Hodi avoided capture and fled north into Gobir, which was hostile to the jihadists. In his place, they appointed Usman Massa, another Kebbi prince who had quarreled with Hodi and joined their cause prior to the invasion.

Following the fall of Birnin Kebbi, many Kebbawa deserted the city, some of whom joined Hodi's resistance. Later that same year, Hodi formed an alliance with Gobir and some Tuareg groups to annihilate the jihadists, who had now established themselves at Gwandu, which had formerly been farmland belonging to the Sarkin Kebbi. In October/November 1805, the armies met at Alwassa, where the coalition inflicted a disastrous defeat on the jihadists. Sometime during the campaign, Usman Massa threw off allegiance to the jihadists and joined the coalition. The now cornered jihadist forces retreated to the naturally protected Gwandu, where they put up a desperate defense over the course of five days, ultimately defeating and routing the alliance forces.

With their survival secured, the jihadists continued their war, subduing the Kebbi region and the surrounding area, eventually defeating Gobir in 1808 and establishing the Sokoto Caliphate. However, the Kebbawa resistance persisted under their sarki, Hodi. After the failed campaign in 1805, Hodi moved to Augi, which the jihadists captured in 1808. He then retired to the hills of Fafara, where he built Birnin Fafara. He stayed there for seven years before moving to Argungu.

Five years into his stay at Argungu, the Sokoto leader Muhammed Bello sent Hodi a message informing him that he was free to return to Birnin Kebbi on the condition that he submitted. Hodi accepted this invitation and submitted, but less than a month later, he "realized the shame of this act and was persuaded to move to Kimba." For the next decade, Hodi led the Kebbawa resistance against the Sokoto Caliphate from his camps at Kimba, Augi, and Argungu. In 1826, Hodi was killed by Muhammad Bukhari, a Sokoto commander. His grave at Madacin Zama became a place of reverence for the Kebbawa of Romo and Kebbe.

Following Hodi's death, his son Jibril submitted to the Caliphate at Gwandu and was put in charge of the town of Kebbe. This angered Samaila (better known as Karari), Hodi's brother, especially after Jibril accepted the title of Sarkin Kebbi from Gwandu. In 1827, Samaila established the Argungu Emirate, which became the capital of the Kebbawa and their center of resistance against Sokoto and Gwandu.
