= Parfait-Louis Monteil =

French explorer

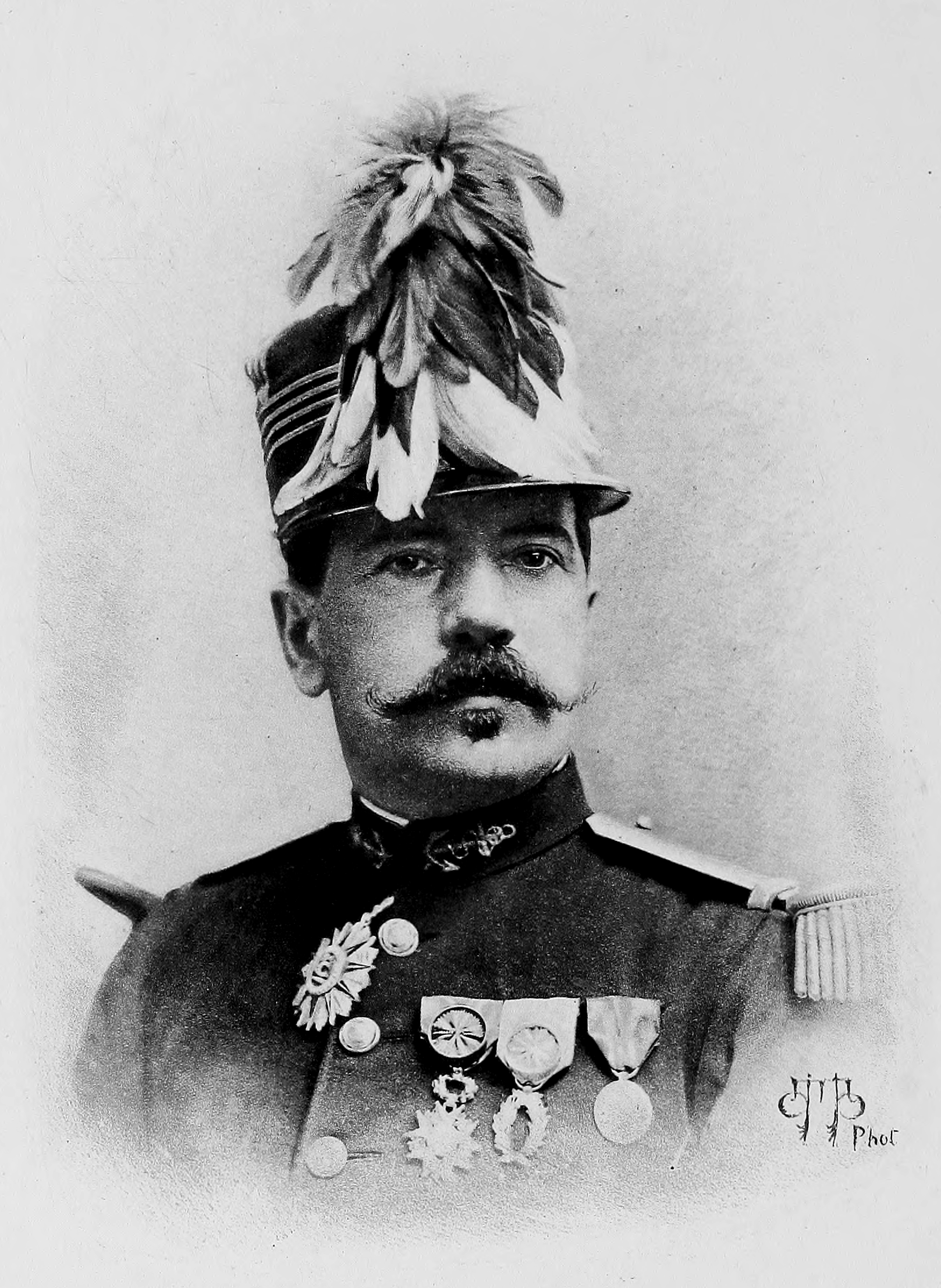
Parfait-Louis Monteil

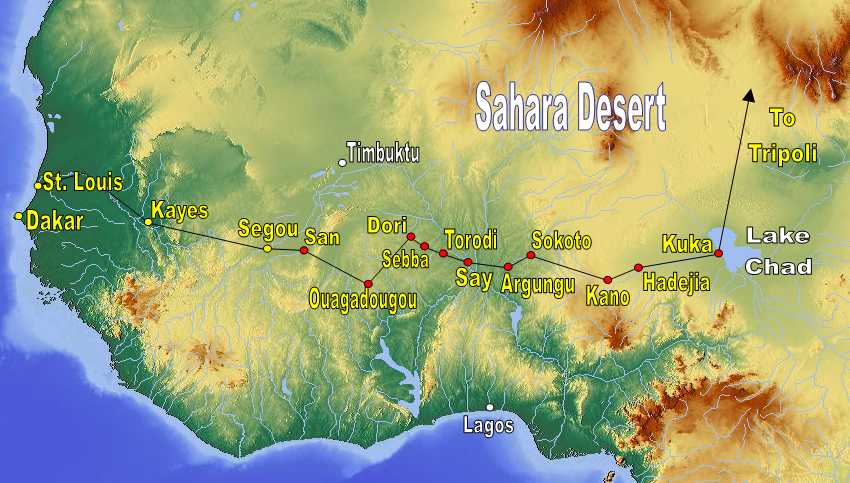
West Africa showing the general route taken by Parfait-Louis Monteil during his 1890–1892 expedition. The route to Lake Chad was mainly through Sudanian Savanna, grasslands with scattered trees to the south of the drier Sahel.

Parfait-Louis Monteil (1855 – 29 September 1925) was a French colonial military officer and explorer who made an epic journey in West Africa between 1890 and 1892, travelling east from Senegal to Lake Chad, and then north across the Sahara to Tripoli.

== Early career ==
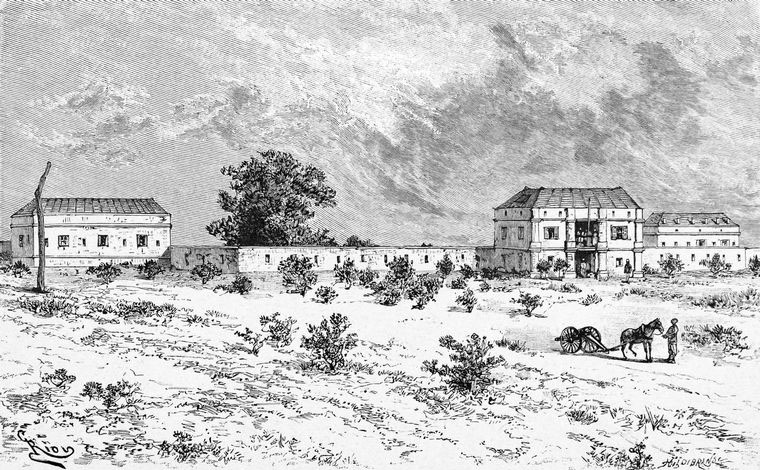
French Fort of Bamako 1883

Monteil was the older brother of Charles Monteil (1871–1949), who became a distinguished ethologist. Monteil was a graduate of the École spéciale militaire de Saint-Cyr. He served in Senegal, where his duties included cartographical surveys. In 1884 he was made a member of the Société de géographie de Paris and in 1886 became an officer of the society. He was influenced by the former governor of Senegal, Louis Faidherbe, whom he regularly visited in his apartment (where Faidherbe was confined by paralysis) in the middle 1880s.

Monteil served in the French protectorate of Annam, now part of Vietnam, from 1886 to 1888. He then spent time investigating a railway project to link Bafoulabé and Bamako in Senegal, before launching on his great journey across West Africa in 1890.

== Political background ==
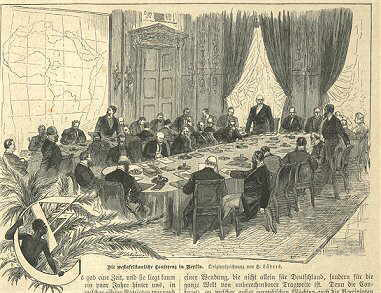
The conference of Berlin (1884–1885)

France, Britain, Germany, Portugal and Italy came to a broad agreement on the way in which they would divide up the continent of Africa at the 1884–1885 Berlin Conference. France gained primacy in the bulk of West Africa from Algeria and Tunisia south across the Sahara and the Sahel into the Sudanian Savanna. The other powers could extend their coastal colonies north from the Gulf of Guinea into the interior. In the case of Britain, these colonies included the Gambia, Sierra Leone, the Gold Coast (now Ghana), the Lagos colony and the territory claimed by the Royal Niger Company.

On 5 August 1890 the British and French concluded an agreement to clarify the boundary between French West Africa and what would become Nigeria. Britain would acquire all territories up to and including the Sokoto Caliphate, while the French would take the lands further to the north. However, they did not know the extent of the Sokoto Caliphate. Monteil was given charge of an expedition to discover its northern limits.

== From Senegal to Tripoli via Chad ==
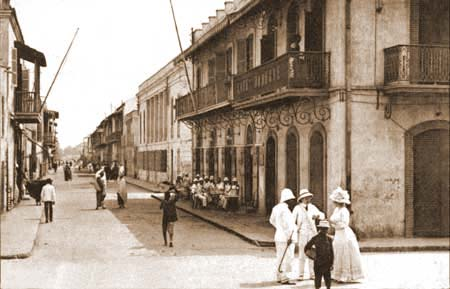
Colonial Saint Louis c. 1900. Europeans and Africans on the Rue Lebon.

Colonel Monteil and a small party of Frenchmen arrived in Dakar in September 1890. He traveled by railway up the coast to St. Louis where he hired bearers and tirailleurs. He continued his journey up the Sénégal River by steamer, arriving on 18 October 1890 at Kayes, where he bought equipment and horses. Monteil reached Ségou on the upper Niger River on 14 December, the last outpost of the French in the Sudan. The countries to the east were known to be Moslem, were rumored to be rich in gold, slaves and ivory, but were uncharted territory to Europeans.

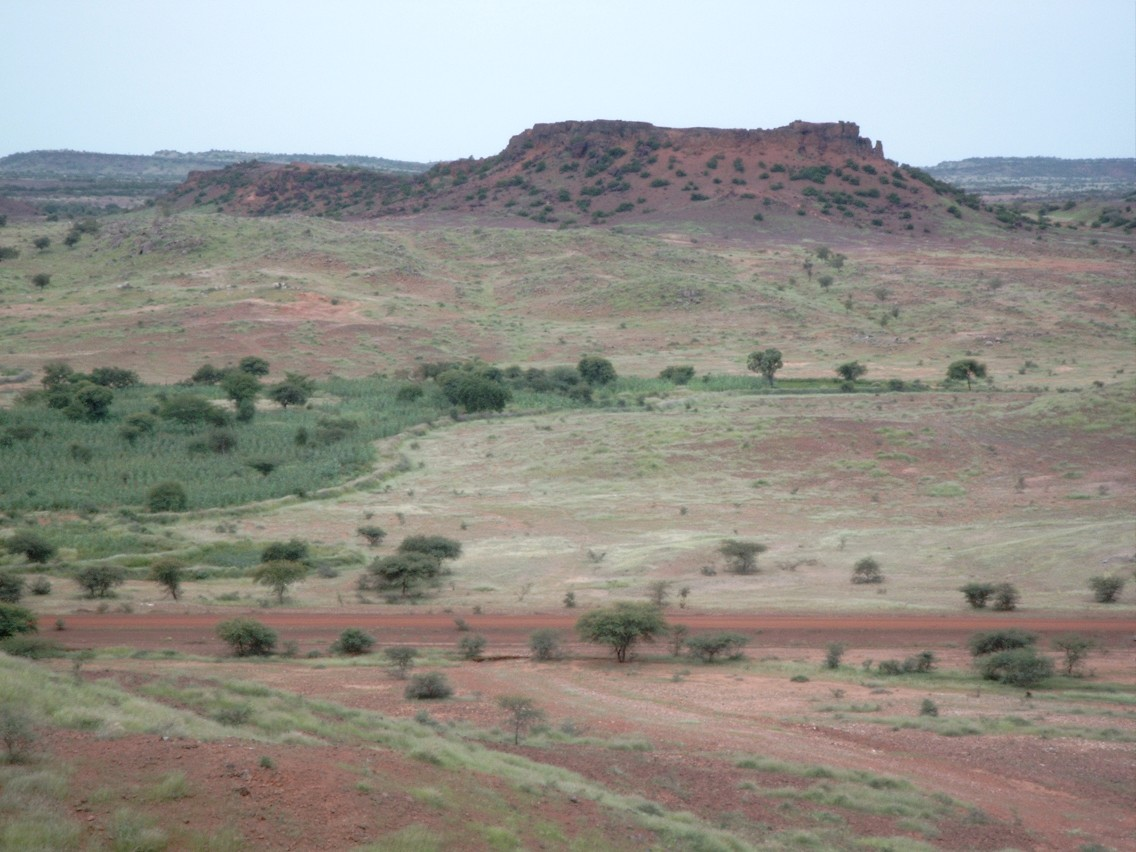
Landscape between Dori and Yalgo

Monteil set out eastwards, generally obtaining a friendly reception and signing treaties of friendship, although suffering from heat, mosquitos and lack of drinking water. The Almami of San signed a peace treaty placing the town under French protection. Monteil praised the caravan center at San, saying that transactions could be made in total security, with no duties levied on imports, exports or sales.

Entering what is now Burkina Faso, Monteil wanted Wobogo, the Mogho Naba of Mossy and ruler of Ouagadougou, to agree to a French protectorate. Wobogo refused to receive him, and he was forced to make a hurried departure. He reached Dori, the capital of Liptako, on 22 May 1891, at a time when the Amiirou, Amadou Iisa, was dying, and became involved in a dispute over succession. Monteil started to negotiate a treaty with the followers of Issa, son of the Amiirou and next in line, but the Amiirous's nephew Sori managed to gain the support needed to become the next ruler.

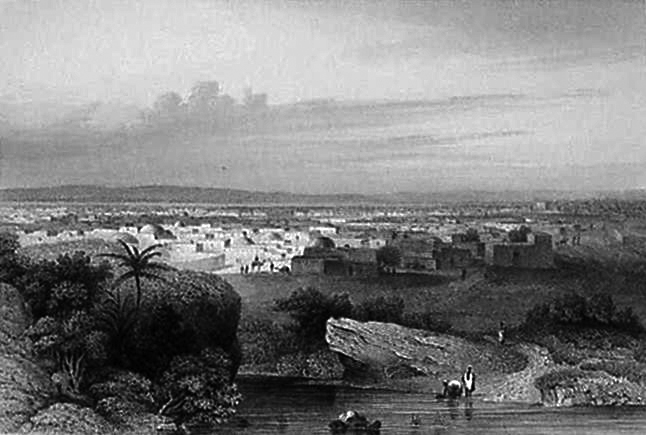
1850 steel engraving of Kano

In June Monteil went on to Sebba, capital of Yagha, where after a considerable payment to the "greedy" ruler another treaty was agreed. From there he travelled via Torodi to Say, a large commercial town on the Niger River, and then onward to Sokoto via the Argungu triangle. He observed that the Kebbi Argungu Emirate was independent of the Sokoto Caliphate. This later became a point of dispute between the French and British authorities. Further, he found little evidence that the Royal Niger Company was present in the region as claimed, apart from some trading posts in the Gwandu Emirate to the south of Argundu.

Monteil was welcomed by the Caliph of Sokoto, Abd ar-Rahman dan Abi Bakar, who at the time was engaged in a war with the Emir of Argungu. He signed a treaty with the Caliph on 28 October 1891, and presented him with silks, brocades, embroidered caftans and money. He said the state of the Caliphate was precarious when he visited, but may have overestimated the combined effects of the war and the recent accession of an unpopular ruler. Shortly after Monteil left, Sokoto defeated Argungu.

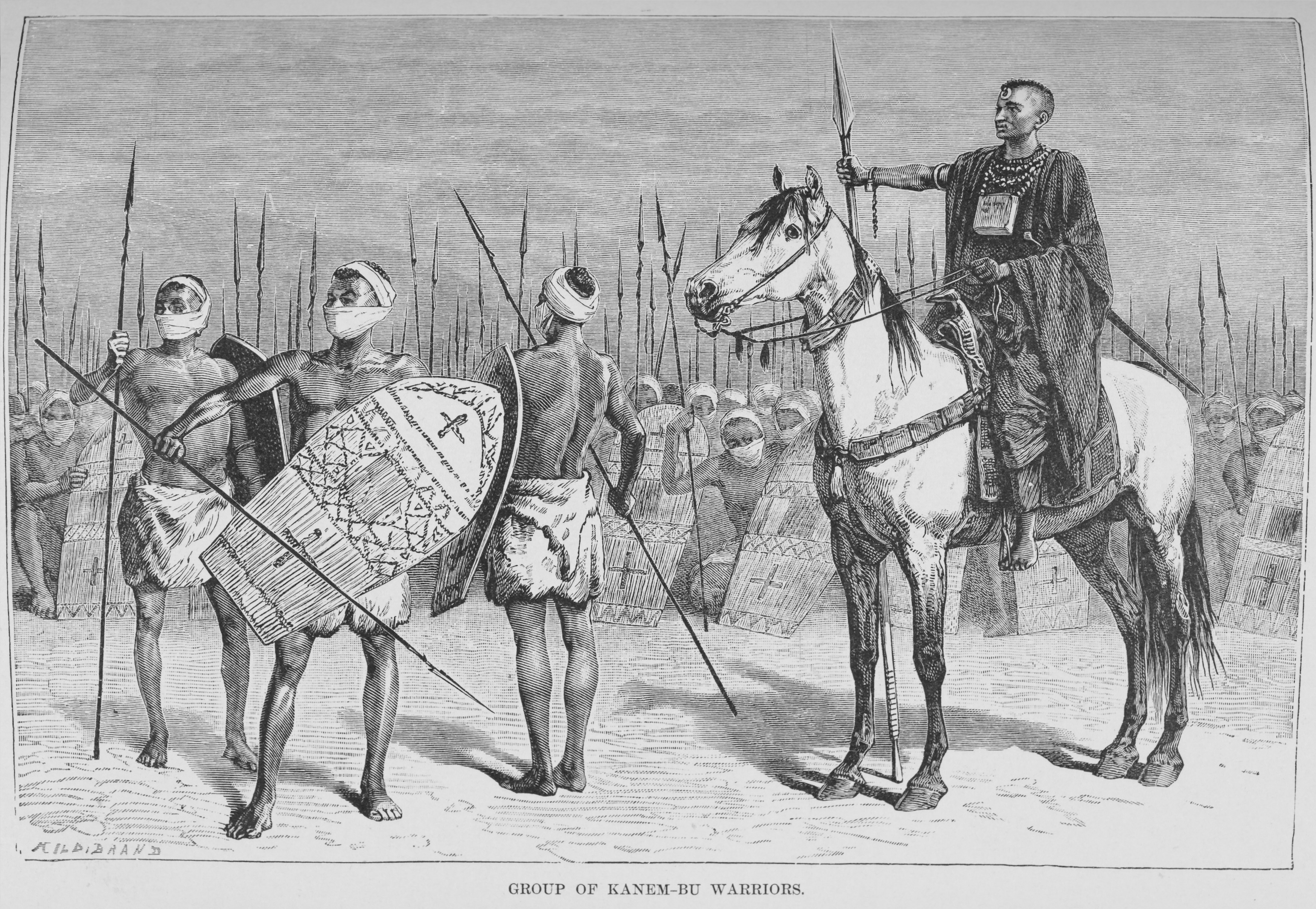
Kanembu warriors of Bornu and their mounted chief in an illustration from H. Barth's Travels and Discoveries Vol III, 1857.

Monteil journeyed from Sokoto to the important trading center of Kano, then via Hadejia to Lake Chad. On 9 April 1892 he reached Kuka on the shore of the lake, where he was met by a group of 150 cavalrymen arrayed in colorful costumes, with their horses dressed in padded caparisons. The horsemen charged him with spears leveled, stopping at the last minute, a sign of respect and also a test of courage.

He exchanged courtesies with the Sultan of Bornu, and was his guest for several months while he explored the country around the lake – and while the Sultan tried to extract gifts in exchange for a safe conduct.

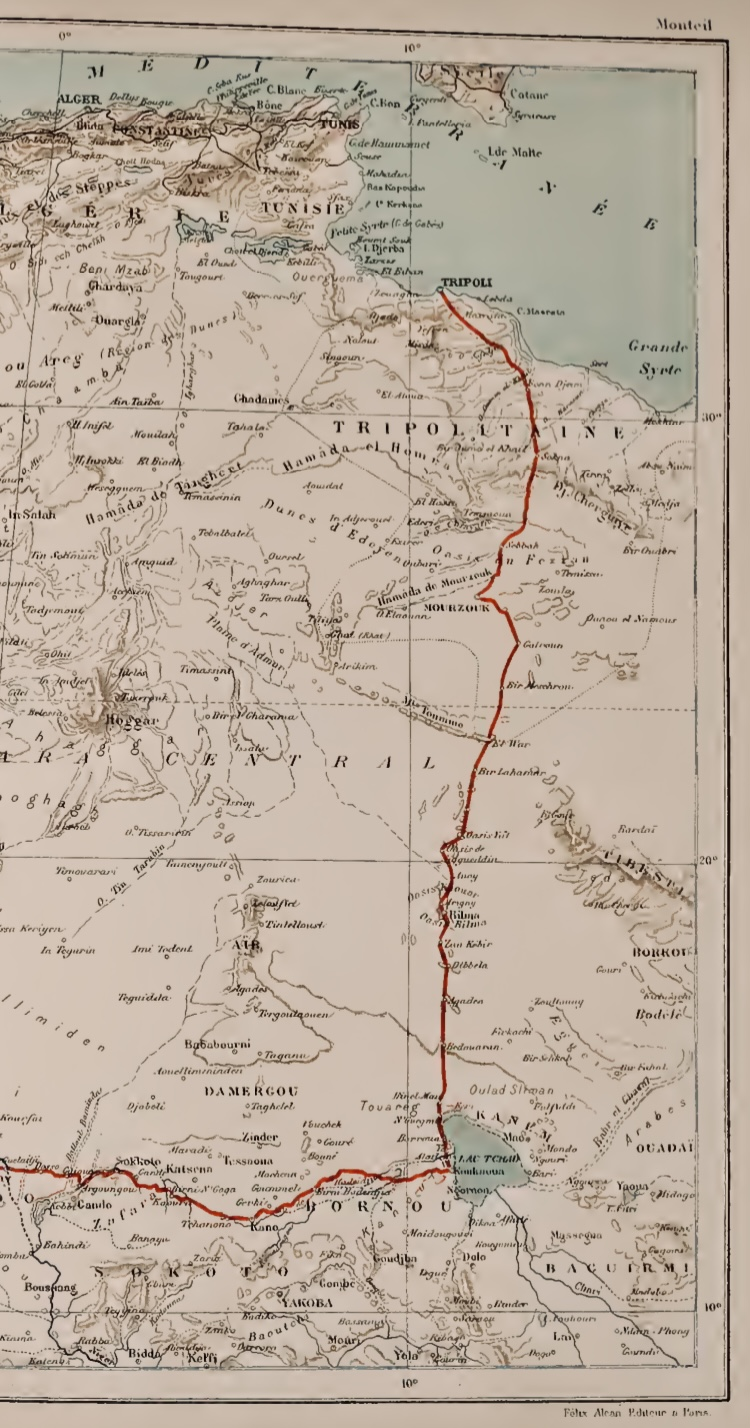
Tripoli–Murzuk–Lake Chad route map by Monteil, published 1895

When finally allowed to depart, he traveled northward across the Sahara to Tripoli, reaching the Mediterranean on 10 December 1892. His journey had done much to clarify for Europeans, and for France in particular, the geography and politics of the region. Within 15 years, almost all the territory Monteil had visited was firmly under colonial control.

== Later career ==
After Monteil's return to France, in 1893 the Société de géographie awarded him the Grand Gold Medal for his book recording the journey. The successful expedition across West Africa impressed the statesman Théophile Delcassé, who took Monteil to meet the President of France, Sadi Carnot on 4 May 1893. Carnot wanted Monteil to undertake an expedition to Fashoda on the upper Nile, but on 30 May Delcassé sent him to the French Congo to reinforce Haut-Oubangui (now the Central African Republic) against Belgian intrusions. He arrived at the port of Luango on 24 August 1894, planning to travel first to Ubangi and then onwards to the Nile. Before starting for the interior, however, he was urgently reassigned to the Ivory Coast to help deal with the threat from the imam-warrior Samori Ture. In September 1894 he directed an expedition into Baoulé country in the Ivory Coast, reaching Tiassalé in December before being turned back by fierce opposition north of the city. The Governor of French Sudan, Albert Grodet, took some of the blame for the fiasco.

Later, Monteil tried without success to enter politics, and was involved in colonization of the south of Tunisia. He died at Herblay, Seine-et-Oise in 1925.

== Selected works ==
- Monteil, Parfait-Louis (1882). Voyage d'exploration au Sénégal [Voyage of Exploration in Senegal] (in French). Paris: Papeet.
- Monteil, Parfait-Louis (1884). En France et aux colonies, vade-mecum de l'officier d'infanterie de marine [Handbook of an Officer of the Marine Infantry] (in French). Paris: Baudoin et Cie.
- Monteil, Parfait-Louis (1894). De Saint-Louis a Tripoli par le Lac Tchad, Voyage au Travers du Soudan et du Sahara Accompli Pendant les Années 1890-91-92 [From Saint-Louis to Tripoli via Lake Chad ...] (in French). Paris: Félix Alcan.
- Barth, Heinrich; Voulet, Paul; Monteil, Parfait-Louis (1897). Textes anciens sur le Burkina (1853–1897) [Ancient Texts on Burkina (1853–1897)] (in French). Paris: Sépia.
- Monteil, Parfait-Louis (1902). Une page d'histoire coloniale: la colonne de Kong, 1895 [A Page of Colonial History: The Colony of Kong, 1895] (in French). Paris: Henri Charles-Lavauzelle.
- Monteil, Parfait-Louis (1924). Quelques feuillets de l'histoire coloniale [Some Pages of Colonial History] (in French). Paris: Société d'éditions géographiques maritimes et coloniales.
