= Yakubu Nabame =

King of Argungu from 1849 to 1854

- Sarkin Kebbi of Argungu

King of Argungu
- Reign: 1849–1854
- Predecessor: Karari
- Successor: Yusufu Mainasara
- Born: Yakubu dan Samaila circa 1819
- Died: 1854
- Issue: Muhammadu Ba'are; Samaila II; Suleimana; among others
- Dynasty: Lekawa
- Father: Samaila 'Karari' dan Suleimana

Yakubu Nabame (c. 1819–1854) was the King of Argungu and leader of the Kebbawa resistance from 1849 until his death in 1854. He is best known for reigniting and leading the struggle for independence against the Sokoto Caliphate, which had conquered Kebbi during its early 19th-century jihad. After years of exile at the Caliph's palace in Sokoto, Nabame returned to Kebbi, declared himself Sarkin Kebbi ('Lord of Kebbi') in 1849, and initiated a revolt that marked the first major territorial loss for the Caliphate outside Bornu. His resistance ended an 18-year truce and continued until the fall of the Caliphate in 1903, cementing Kebbi's independence as an irreversible reality. Nabame is remembered as a heroic figure in Kebbi's history.

== Early life ==
In the 1810s, Yakubu Nabame was born to Samaila (better known as Karari), a prince of the Hausa kingdom of Kebbi. He was raised during a period of great instability in the region. Kebbi had fallen to the Sokoto Caliphate during its jihad from 1804 to 1809. Under Nabame's uncle, Muhammadu Hodi, the Kebbawa waged fierce resistance against Gwandu, the vassal state of the Caliphate overseeing the area.

After Hodi's death in 1826, his brother Karari, Nabame's father, adopted the title of Sarkin Kebbi ("Lord of Kebbi") and established himself in Argungu, continuing the struggle for independence. Argungu soon became the capital town for the Kebbawa and their center of resistance. In 1831, a combined force from Gwandu and Sokoto besieged Argungu. The Kebbawa held out for some time, but after the Gwandu forces set fire to their houses, they were forced to capitulate.

Karari managed to escape to Zazzagawa, where he assembled a fresh army from among the Zabarma and Arewa subjects. After suffering two successive defeats against Gwandu, Karari fled once more. However, his old age and an injury sustained in battle slowed him down. Realising he could not avoid capture, he dismounted his horse and commanded his son Nabame to continue without him. Initially reluctant to leave his father behind, Nabame eventually rode away. The Gwandu forces found Karari seated on his shield, holding his rosary in a posture of prayer, and killed him.

== Exile in Sokoto ==
Following his father's death, Nabame spent a year or two hiding among the Arewa, who protected him from Sokoto. Eventually, he decided to surrender to Gwandu. After some deliberation, it was agreed to spare his life, and he was exiled to Sokoto in 1831. Nabame was said to be about 12 years old at the time of his exile.

During Nabame's exile in Sokoto, the Kebbawa abandoned their revolt and submitted to Sokoto. While at the Caliph's palace, Nabame was groomed to eventually assume leadership of the Kebbawa and become a firm ally of the Caliphate. He quickly gained favour and trust in Sokoto, particularly with Caliph Ali Babba (r. 1842–1859), who reportedly regarded him as a son.

Caliph Ali appointed Nabame to a senior command in the Sokoto army, where he led several expeditions. During one such campaign against a Gobir revolt in Zamfara in 1847, a Gobir horseman recognised Nabame and shouted, "You should be on our side, not helping those who slew your father!" Although Nabame ignored the taunt at the time, it weighed heavily on his mind. During the battle, the Gobirawa nearly killed Umaru, a son of Ali, but Nabame narrowly saved him. Upon returning to Sokoto, Nabame was rewarded with his freedom and allowed to return to his people.

== Revolt and death ==
Back in Kebbi, Nabame continued to be troubled by the taunts of the Gobirawa. In 1849, he renounced his allegiance to Sokoto and declared himself Sarkin Kebbi, ending the 18-year truce between Kebbi and the Sokoto Caliphate. His revolt quickly gained momentum, with support coming in from his Kebbawa kinsmen and his father's former allies in Arewa and Zabarma.

The Caliphate forces, caught unprepared, suffered significant losses, including the powerful stronghold of Silame. A combined army from Gwandu and Sokoto attempted to capture Nabame's Argungu but was ultimately forced to retreat.

Caliph Ali's retreat marked the first surrender of territory by the Sokoto Caliphate outside of Bornu since its original conquests. Following Nabame's revival of the Kebbawa struggle for independence, the Kebbawa continued to harass the Caliphate for over fifty years until its collapse in 1903, solidifying Kebbi's independence as an irreversible reality. The Kebbawa frequently organised raiding parties and engaged in guerrilla warfare, preventing the Caliphate from ever fully subduing them. Nabame was eventually killed during one of these raids in 1854.

== Legacy ==
Yakubu Nabame came to be revered among the Kebbawa who regard him as "a heroic figure, like Wallace or Bruce, who snapped the fetters of servitude and led his people back to dignity and freedom".

The palace Nabame built in Argungu, known as Gidan Nabame ("Nabame's House"), served as the primary residence for his successors for almost a century. Today, it stands as a museum dedicated to the history of Kebbi.
