= Usman Massa =

Emir of Kebbi in the 1800s

Usman Massa (died 1800s), sometimes spelled Masa, was a member of the ruling dynasty of the Kebbi Kingdom who briefly reigned as emir under the Sokoto jihadists.

Massa was the son of one of the 18th century kings of Kebbi, either Muhammadu dan Giwa (r. 1750–1754) or Sulaiman (r. 1775–1803). After the outbreak of the jihad of Usman dan Fodio in Gobir, Massa joined the jihadists. This came after he quarrelled with the newly installed Sarkin Kebbi Muhammadu Hodi, who had seized the throne after murdering the incumbent, his brother Ukar.

In April 1805, the jihadist army under Abdullahi dan Fodio attacked and captured the Kebbi capital, Birnin Kebbi. Hodi fled north and allied with Gobir against the jihadists. In his place, Abdullahi installed Massa as the first Emir of Kebbi.

Massa's allegiance to the jihadists was short-lived. Later that year he joined a coalition against the jihadists, who were now established in Gwandu. The campaign included Kebbawa rebels under Hodi, Gobir, Tuareg groups, and contingents from other Hausa states. The coalition initially defeated them at the Battle of Alwassa but failed to press their advantage. When the jihadists regrouped at Gwandu, the coalition was routed and forced to retreat.

Massa continued resistance against the jihadists until he was eventually killed. After his death, the jihadists did not appoint a successor. Although Massa was de facto ruler of Kebbi under the jihadists, he was never formally recognised by the Kebbawa and never held the title Sarkin Kebbi (Lord of Kebbi), which remained with Hodi until his death in 1826.
