= Zauro polder project =

Irrigation project in Kebbi

Coordinates: 12°26′15″N 4°12′28″E

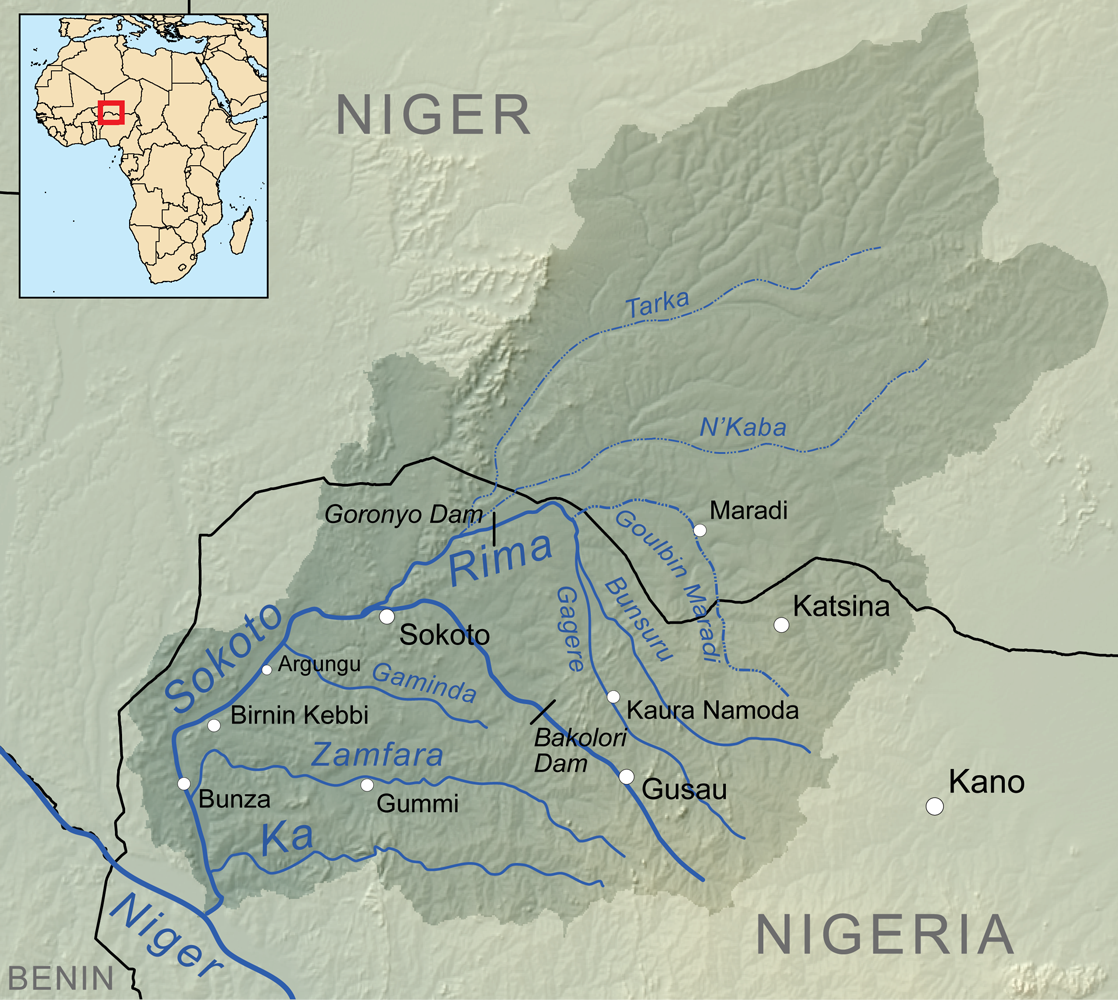
Sokoto river basin. Project is planned upstream from Birnin Kebbi to Argungu

The Zauro polder project is an irrigation scheme that has long been planned for the Rima River floodplain in Kebbi State, Nigeria. The project is controversial, and would demand careful management to achieve the planned benefits.

== Location ==
Kebbi State is mainly covered by Sudanian Savanna, open woodland with scattered trees. It is intersected by the lowlands of the Rima and Niger rivers, which are seasonally flooded. There is a wet season between May and September, with little rain in the remainder of the year. Mean annual rainfall is about 800 millimetres (31 in). Average temperatures are about 26 °C (79 °F), ranging from 21 to 40 °C (70 to 104 °F) between April and June. Dams and irrigation schemes have often been proposed to make the abundant water of the rainy season available for farming in the dry season.

== Plan ==
The project was originally conceived in 1969 as a joint venture between the state government and the federal ministry of agriculture and water resources. The dam would be situated in the floodplain of the Rima River between Argungu and Birnin Kebbi, irrigating 10,572 hectares (26,120 acres) of farmland. Crops would include rice, maize, wheat, barley and vegetables such as cow peas, onions, tomatoes, sweet potatoes and Irish potatoes. The dam would also benefit the fishing industry, important in the state. The project would include construction of a reservoir and canals used to irrigate and drain polders, areas of farmland protected from flooding by dikes. After a review of the original design, it was changed to reduce water loss from evaporation in the dry season, and also reduce costs, by replacing the open channels with an aquifer recharge system, using wells to draw water from the aquifer for irrigation. The risk of damage from flooding would be mitigated by the Goronyo Dam upstream in Sokoto State, which would also provide water in the dry season.

There have been repeated delays. A July 1995 report noted that the project was in "standstill" status. In March 2003, while campaigning for reelection in Birnin Kebbi, President Olusegun Obasanjo pledged to complete the project. In October 2006, the Federal and Kebbi state governments signed a memorandum of understanding for execution of the project, at an estimated cost of N15 billion. In May 2008 President Umaru Musa Yar'Adua ordered work to start immediately on the first phase of the project, which was now estimated to cost over N18.5 billion. In January 2009, Kebbi State governor Sa'idu Dakingari said work would soon commence.

== Pilot project ==
A pilot project was inaugurated in 1982 covering 100 hectares (250 acres) in the northern part of Birnin Kebbi. A study of the project issued in 2009 stated that conditions have steadily deteriorated during the project lifetime, with water-logging causing loss of productive farmland due to salinity and alkalinity. The causes include lack of site leveling to allow outflow of surface water, poor maintenance of drains and canals and over-irrigation by farmers. These issues would have to be addressed for the full project to succeed. In 2000, the Federal Ministry of Water Resources said that it was planning to rehabilitate the pilot project. An audit of Federal Government accounts for the year 2007 showed that a 2002 contract worth almost N84 million with 25% advance payment had been awarded for rehabilitation of the dikes and drainage. However, the project seemed to have been abandoned after payment of the mobilization fee.

== Controversy ==
In July 2008, over 1,000 farmers protesting the siting of the project tried to lynch the Kebbi State deputy governor, Alhaji Ibrahim Aliyu, and the emir of Argungu, Alhaji Samaila Mera, at the emir's palace. One concern is that the reservoir will flood the area where the Argunga fishing festival is held, an important source of income from tourists. There were threats to disrupt to 2009 Argungu fishing festival, but the emir promised to provide a solution after the festival was held. When none was forthcoming, the people of Argungu started throwing stones at the emir whenever they saw him. Some farmers are concerned that the project will flood their farmland, although they have been assured that they will be paid compensation and helped to relocate. Others blame resistance on fear of the unknown, and are confident that the project will improve agricultural productivity, saying they are confident that the government is doing the right thing.

Conflicts over irrigation and flood control projects such as the Zauro polder project are unavoidable. Farmers with low-lying fields want less flooding while farmers higher up want more. Fishermen want early flooding, farmers want later flooding and pastoralists want an early dry season so they can access grazing lands. With proper management, these problems can be solved.
