= Kingdom of Kebbi =

Hausa kingdom

Kingdom of Kebbi Masarautar Kebbi (Hausa) مسرعة كَبِ
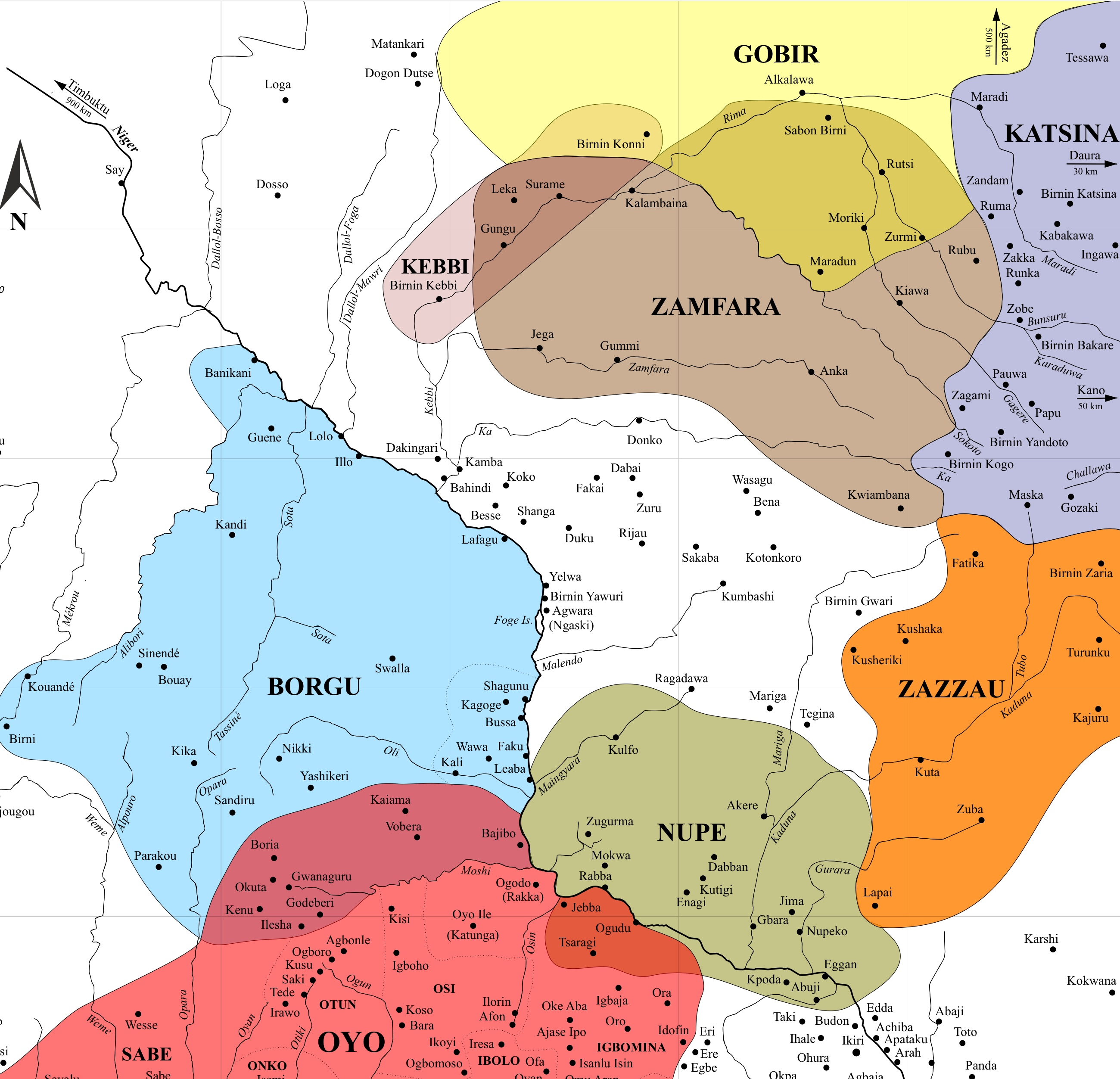
- Map of western Hausaland in 1760
- Capital: Birnin Leka; Surame; Birnin Kebbi
- Common languages: Hausa
- Religion: Sunni Islam; Hausa animism
- Demonym: singular: Ba-kebbe; plural: Kebbawa
- Government: Sarauta
- Kanta
  - 1516–1561: Muhammadu Kanta (first)
  - 1826–1827: Samaila II Karari (last)
Succeeded by
Argungu Emirate; Gwandu Emirate
- Today part of: Kebbi State, Nigeria

The Kingdom of Kebbi (Hausa: Masarautar Kebbi) was a Hausa kingdom in what is now northwestern Nigeria.

The history of Kebbi is usually traced from the mid-16th century, when after a successful revolt against the Songhai Empire, Kanta Kotal established the Kingdom of Kebbi on the western edges of Hausaland.

Through Kanta's expansionist campaigns, Kebbi grew into a small but formidable empire. By the end of his reign, Kebbi had conquered vast territories and exacted tributes from much of Hausaland. However, its succeeding rulers were unable to retain this influence, and by the mid 17th century, it ceased to be a great power. By the early 18th century, its tributaries Gobir and Zamfara successfully revolted and secured their full independence, further reducing Kebbi's influence and prestige. Yet, Kebbi remained one of the leading states in Hausaland at the turn of the 19th century.

Following the outbreak of the Sokoto Jihad, the jihadists under Abdullahi dan Fodio invaded Kebbi and captured its capital, Birnin Kebbi. Abdullahi then established the Gwandu Emirate under the Sokoto Caliphate, annexing much of the kingdom’s territory. However, Gwandu was unable to fully subjugate the Kebbawa, who continued their resistance, first under the ousted sarki Muhammadu Hodi, and later under his successor, Karari, who founded Argungu as the kingdom's traditional successor.

== History ==
=== Origins and expansion ===
According to the locally known Hausa legend, the Kebbi kingdom was one of the Banza Bakwai ("seven bastards") or seven "illegitimate" states. The rulers of these states were supposed to trace their lineage to a concubine of the Hausa founding father, Bayajidda, hence the locally disdainful term banza ("illegitimate"). Sokoto Caliph Muhammad Bello wrote that the Kebbawa descended from a Katsinawa mother and a Songhay father.

The first historical references date to the time when the area came under Songhay rule during the reign of Sunni Ali (1464–92). The area of the lower Rima valley was initially governed by clan chiefs (magira), and saw immigration of other Hausa. One such person was Muhammadu Kanta from Kuyambana in Katsina, who came to de-facto rule Songhay's sub-province of Kebbi through his militaristic skill. The earliest documented mention of a Kebbi ruler is to be found in Al-Sa'di's Ta'rïkh al-Südän where it is related that in the year 1516-7 Kanta Kuta, ruler of Leka, revolted against the dendi fari ("governor of the eastern front", a provincial governor), and established his independence which lasted until the downfall of the Songhay empire. The reason for Kebbi's break with Songhay was the refusal of the dendi fari to give the Kanta his share of the booty obtained in an expedition against the Sultanate of Air. In the year 1517–8, an attempt was made by Songhay to re-establish its authority over Kebbi, but was unsuccessful. Kuta was succeeded, probably in 1523-4 by Muhammad Kanta and it was under him that Kebbi emerged as a formidable power in the Central Sudan. During the reign of the Songhay Askia Muhammad Bunkan, the Kanta was able to inflict a crushing defeat on Songhay, the Askia's army was scattered 'pell-mell' and Muhammad Bunkan was fortunate to get away with his life. Al-Sa'di's Ta'rïkh al-Südän, which records this incident, says that no other Askia again attempted an expedition against Kebbi. During this period Surame, of which the massive walls still survive, was the capital of the kingdom. Following this, Kanta aggregated various villages into fortified towns, including Birnin Kebbi which became his base in defence against the Songhay.

Kebbi became a major power in the region. Kanta further resisted Songhay attacks and occupied Agadez, capturing the region from Songhay. He expanded into Yauri and Nupe, and Muhammad Bello wrote that Kanta's conquests extended to all of Hausaland and parts of Bornu. Bornu invaded Hausa states under Kanta's control, however he routed their armies. Following this, in 1556 Kanta died, and the Hausa states stopped paying tribute. Kanta's successor, Ahmadu, chose not to use military force to regain their tribute. Kebbi also lost control of Agadez as Kano and Katsina intervened in support of a claimant. By the end of the 16th century Kebbi had become a minor kingdom.

=== Struggle against the Fulani Jihadists ===
During the Fulani jihad, in 1808 Abdullahi dan Fodio (c. 1766–1828), the younger brother of Shaihu Usman dan Fodio, defeated the forces of Kebbi. He became ruler of the Gwandu Emirate, which dominated the northeast of the Sokoto Caliphate. The Sarkin Kebbi, Muhammadu Hodi, was driven from his capital and replaced by a puppet ruler, Usuman Masa. However, the Kebbawa continued to resist, and Abdullahi was unable to complete the conquest. Muhammadu Hodi fought on in the Zamfara Valley, and his successor Karari in Argungu and Zazzagawa. On Karari's death in 1831, his son Yakubu Nabame surrendered, and for 16 years lived in exile in Sokoto until Sultan Aliyu Babba allowed him to return to Argungu as a vassal of the Caliphate.

In 1849 Yakubu renounced his allegiance and proclaimed himself Sarkin Kebbi. After see-saw battles, including at one time a siege of Argungu by Sokoto forces, Sultan Aliyu of Sokoto effectively recognized the independence of the Kebbi Emirate based in Argungu. However the Sokoto government effectively controlled Kebbi politics and it acted as a puppet state. Kebbi now formed a hostile wedge between Sokoto and Gwandu, and sporadic warfare continued for the next fifty years. In 1859 Yakubu's brother and successor Yusufu Mainasara was killed in battle in the dried out floodplain of the Rima River. In 1860 the Emir of Gwandu, Haliru, was killed in battle at Karakara. In 1867 the Fulani recognized the independence of Kebbi in a formal treaty. In 1875 war broke out again when the people of Fanna in the lower Rima valley decided to transfer their allegiance to Gwandu. Sarkin Kebbi Sama'ila achieved a string of successes against Gwandu between 1883 and 1903, with some severe setbacks, until the establishment of the British protectorate of Northern Nigeria finally ended the fighting.

== Rulers ==
Rulers of the Hausa kingdom before incorporation into the Sokoto Caliphate:

Great Hausa kingdom based on Surame and Birnin Kebbi
No.	Name	Reign start	Reign end
1	Muhammadu Kantu Kotal	1516	1561
2	Ahmadu I	1561	1596
3	Dawuda	1596	1619
4	Ibrahimu I	1619	1621
5	Suleimanu I	1621	1636
6	Muhammadu	1636	1649
7	Maliki dan Ibrahimu	1649	1662
8	Umarau Ciwa	1662	1674
9	Muhammadu Kaye	1674	1676
10	Ibrahimu II	1676	1684
11	Muhammadu na Sifawa	1684	1686
12	Ahmadu dan Amaru	1686	1696
13	Tomo	1696	1700
14	Muhammadu dan Giwa	1700	1717
15	Samaila	1717	1750
16	Muhammadu dan Tagande	1750	1754
17	Abdullahi Toga	1754	1775
18	Suleimanu II	1775	1803
19	Abubakar Ukar	1803	
20	Muhammadu Fodi	1803	1826
21	Samaila II	1826	1827

== Sources ==
- Lange, Dierk (2009). "An Assyrian Successor State in West Africa. The Ancestral Kings of Kebbi as Ancient Near Eastern Rulers". Anthropos. 104 (2). Anthropos Institut: 359–382. doi:10.5771/0257-9774-2009-2-359. ISSN 0257-9774. JSTOR 40467180.
