= Surame =

Archaeological site in Nigeria

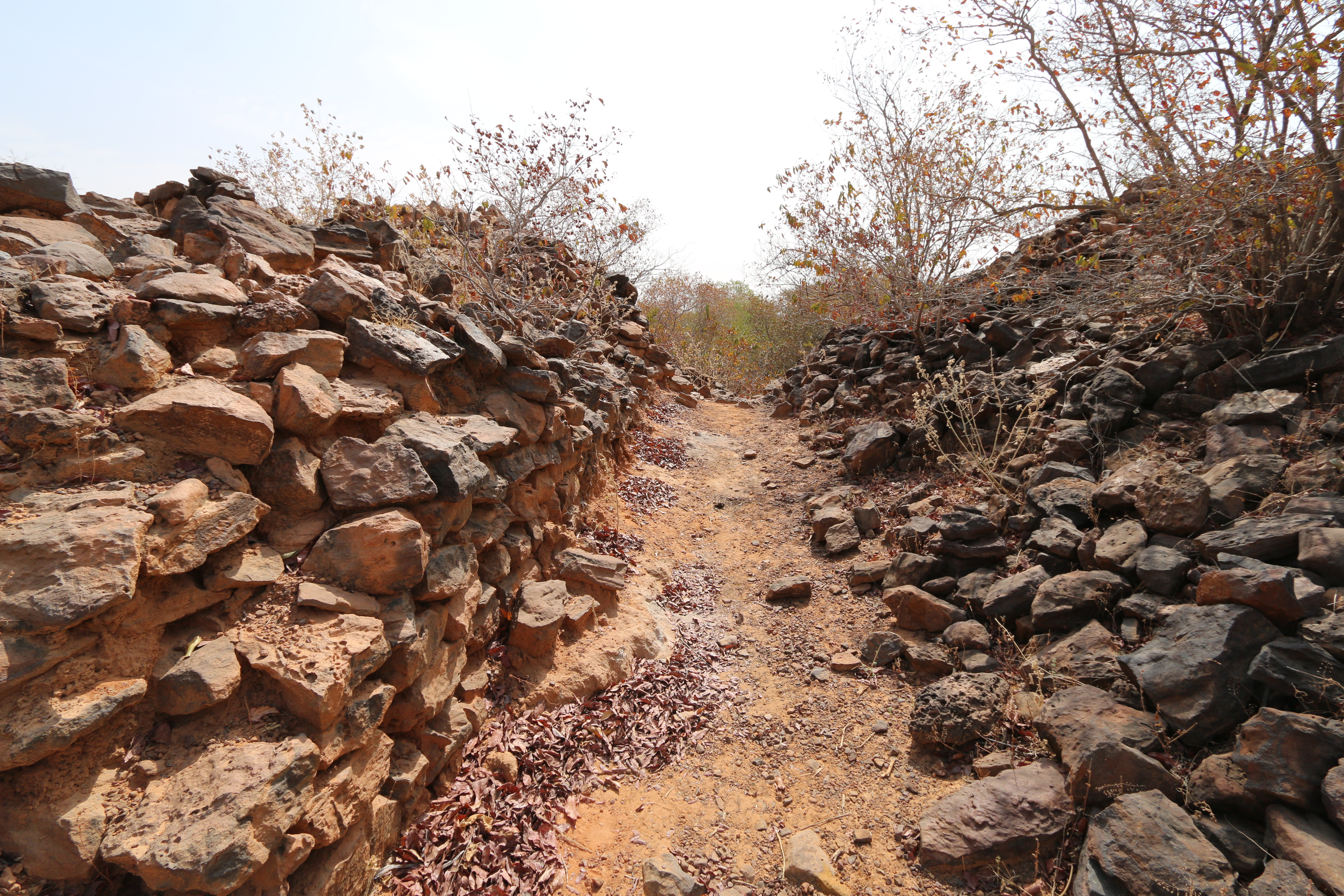
- Some remnants of the city walls

- Location within Nigeria
- 13.088°N 4.899°E
- Location: Silame, Sokoto State, Nigeria

History
- Founded: 16th-century

The ancient city of Surame is a Nigerian national monument located in the Sokoto State of northwestern Nigeria. It was created in the 16th century by Muhammadu Kanta of Kebbi, who controlled an empire in the region. The town was abandoned in about 1700 when the capital moved to Birnin Kebbi.

== Site description ==
Covering an area of 9 km, the site includes the foundation remains of human settlements, walls, wells and potsherds. There exist defensive walls created from stone and mortar immediately around the settlements, as well as ditches dug around the greater area and filled in with thorny bushes as a defensive means.

== History ==
The ancient Kingdom of Surame was in power from the 15th to the 16th centuries.

== Nigerian Ancient Monument ==
Surame was declared an ancient national monument on 15 August 1964.

== World Heritage Status ==
This site was added to the UNESCO World Heritage Tentative List on October 8, 2007 in the Mixed (Cultural + Natural) category.
