= Argungu =

- LGA and town
- Nickname: Gungun Nabame
- Interactive map of Argungu
- Location within Nigeria
- Coordinates: 12°44′N 4°31′E
- Country: Nigeria
- State: Kebbi State

Government
  - Sarkin Kabbi: Samaila Muhammad Mera
  - Local Government Chairman: Aliyu Musa

Population (2007)
  - Total: 47,064
- Time zone: UTC+1 (WAT)

Argungu is a city in Nigeria's Kebbi State, situated on the Sokoto River. As of 2007 Argungu had an estimated population of 47,064. The city is the seat of the Argungu Emirate, a traditional state. The city is a major agricultural center for the area, with key crops including tobacco, peanuts, rice, millet, wheat, and sorghum. The city also hosts an annual international fishing festival which was suspended for 11 years. The Argungu fishing festival was held again in the year 2020 from March 11–14

Argungu has a museum where the historic turbulence and artifactare being kept, and displayed. It is called Kanta museum AKA Gidan Nabame. The dead emirs of the emirates are also buried in the museum.

== History ==
After the Hausa state of Kebbi was conquered by the Fulani Empire in 1808, Kebbi's rulers fled to Argungu to found a new emirate. Though the neighboring Hausa state of Gwandu conquered Kebbi in 1831, it was unable to fully secure control of Argungu, and a series of revolts followed. By the end of the century, Argungu had become a de facto independent state, though it was again conquered by the British in 1902.

The town was originally known as Birnin Lelaba dan Badau. It is said to have derived its current name from a popular Kebbi fishing call, 'a yi gungu' ('let us gather in one place'), or from 'arnan Gungu' ('the pagan people of Gungu town'). However, the latter is less likely.

== Geography ==
Argungu Local Government Area experiences two distinct seasons, namely the rainy season and the dry season. The dry season is characterized by scorching temperatures, with an average temperature in the area reaching around 34 degrees Celsius or 93 degrees Fahrenheit. The region maintains an average humidity level of approximately 24 percent. Its landscape predominantly consists of dry and arid plains, punctuated by scattered hills and other elevated landforms.

The district of Argungu experiences a tropical wet and dry climate, with a yearly temperature of 33.55 °C, 4.09% higher than Nigeria's averages.

Argungu is seeing a positive trend in rising temperatures and a negative trend in falling temperatures, resulting in a warmer and colder climate.

== Economy ==
Agriculture plays a pivotal role in the economic landscape of Argungu Local Government Araea, renowned for the cultivation of various crops including tobacco, groundnut, rice, sorghum, and millet. Fishing also holds significant importance in the local economy, while trade thrives in the region. Markets such as the Argungu Central Market serve as bustling hubs where a diverse array of commodities are exchanged.

== Museum ==
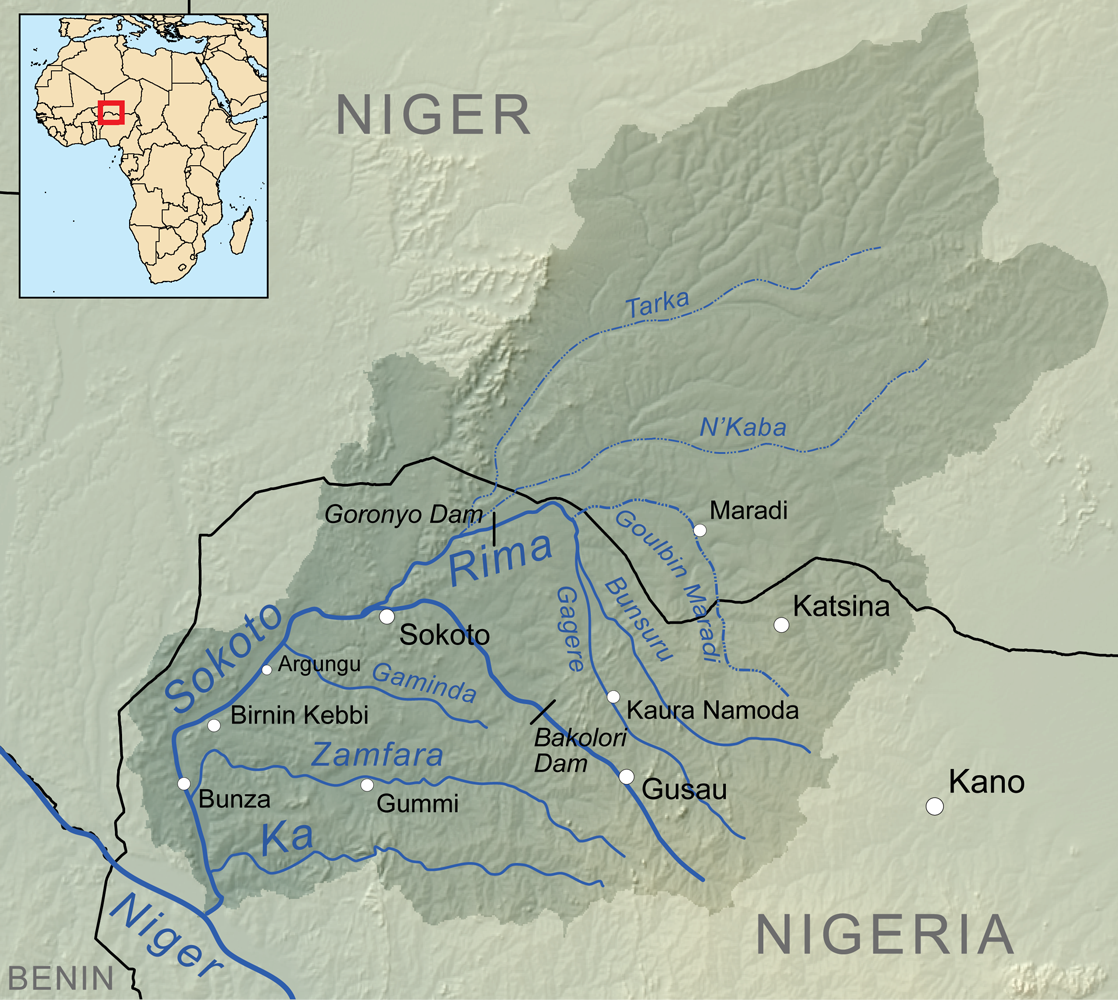
Sokoto river basin, Argungu to the west, downstream from Sokoto

The building of the Kanta Museum, adjacent to the main market was built in 1831 and named after Muhammadu Kanta, who founded the Kebbi Kingdom in 1515. It was erected by Yakubu Nabame, a former Emir of Kebbi, and served as the Emir's palace until 1942 when the British built a new administrative palace during the reign of Muhammed Sani. After the building became vacant, on July 1, 1958, it opened as a museum, offering an insight into the turbulent history of Kebbi State. The museum is divided into eleven compartments and has a notable collection of weapons, consisting of charms, spears, swords, wood, stones, bows and arrows, local guns and even drums on display. The museum is also known to be a place where dead emirs of the local government are buried.

== See also ==
- Argungu Fishing Festival
