= Kanta Kotal =

Ruler of Kebbi

Muhammadu Kanta
- Sarkin Kebbi

King of Kebbi
- Reign: 1516–1561
- Predecessor: Position established
- Successor: Ahmadu
- Born: Bawa, Katsina (today in Sokoto State, Nigeria)
- Died: 1561; Jiruwa, Katsina
- Burial: Unknown
- Issue: Ahmadu; Ibrahim; Muhammadu; Kanna
- Dynasty: Lekawa
- Father: Makata
- Mother: Tamatu

Muhammadu Kanta (died 1561), also known as Kanta Kotal, was a Hausa warrior-king and founder of the Kebbi Empire, the last of the Hausa states to emerge. Kanta rose from humble beginnings to establish a small but formidable empire that resisted both the powerful Songhai and Kanem-Bornu empires.

Kanta rose to prominence as a military commander in the service of the Songhai Empire, joining Askia the Great's campaign to conquer Hausaland in 1513. However, in 1516, he rebelled against Songhai rule after a dispute over war spoils, successfully defeating the forces sent to suppress him. Declaring independence, he established the Kebbi Kingdom and launched expansionist campaigns, conquering vast territories stretching from the Niger River to the Sahara Desert. To the north, he conquered Asben and Aïr; to the south, Nupe and Borgu; to the east, Zamfara and Zazzau; and to the west, Arewa and Zaberma. He seized control of Gobir, Katsina, Kano, Yauri, Zazzau, and other nearby states. His military acumen enabled him to repel both Songhai and Kanem-Bornu forces, solidifying Kebbi's dominance in the region. His reign saw the development of fortified cities such as Surame, whose defensive walls still stand to this day.

Throughout his rule, Kanta was constantlay waging war against his neighbours, particularly against the powerful Kanem-Bornu Empire, which sought to curb Kebbi's influence. Despite multiple large-scale battles, including one in which Bornu fielded 100,000 men, Kanta maintained his independence. In his later years, he led a retaliatory campaign against Bornu but was wounded in a skirmish near Katsina, ultimately succumbing to his injuries. To protect the secrecy of his burial site, his followers constructed multiple tombs along his journey back to Kebbi.

Kanta's reign marked the peak of Kebbi's power, but after his death, the kingdom ceased to be a great power, as his successors were unable to maintain its influence in the region. By the end of the 16th-century, Hausaland had stopped sending tribute to Kebbi, effectively becoming independent. Kebbi had shrunk from an 'empire' to a local kingdom, and its dominance over Hausaland had come to a complete end.

== Early life ==
According to tradition, Muhammadu Kanta's father, Makata, migrated from the east to Bawa, a settlement in present-day Sokoto, Nigeria, which was then part of the Hausa Kingdom of Katsina. Makata was appointed the village head and given the title of Magaji. He married Tamatu, a Katsina princess, and they had two sons, the elder of whom was Kanta. Upon Makata's death, Kanta was not chosen as his successor despite being the eldest son.

Frustrated by being passed over for the position, Kanta left his village and became a cattle grazer. He traveled across Hausaland, moving westward through Gobir and Zamfara before crossing the Rima River. He eventually settled in a village, which some historians identify as Surame, while others suggest it was Leka. Kanta became renowned for his exceptional physical strength and skill in boxing and wrestling, defeating all his opponents and earning the epithet 'Kotal' ('no challenger'). He wore a white ram's skin round his loins, an armlet of the same skin, and his fighting hand was wrapped in the hairs of a white ram's tail.

== Ruler of Kebbi ==
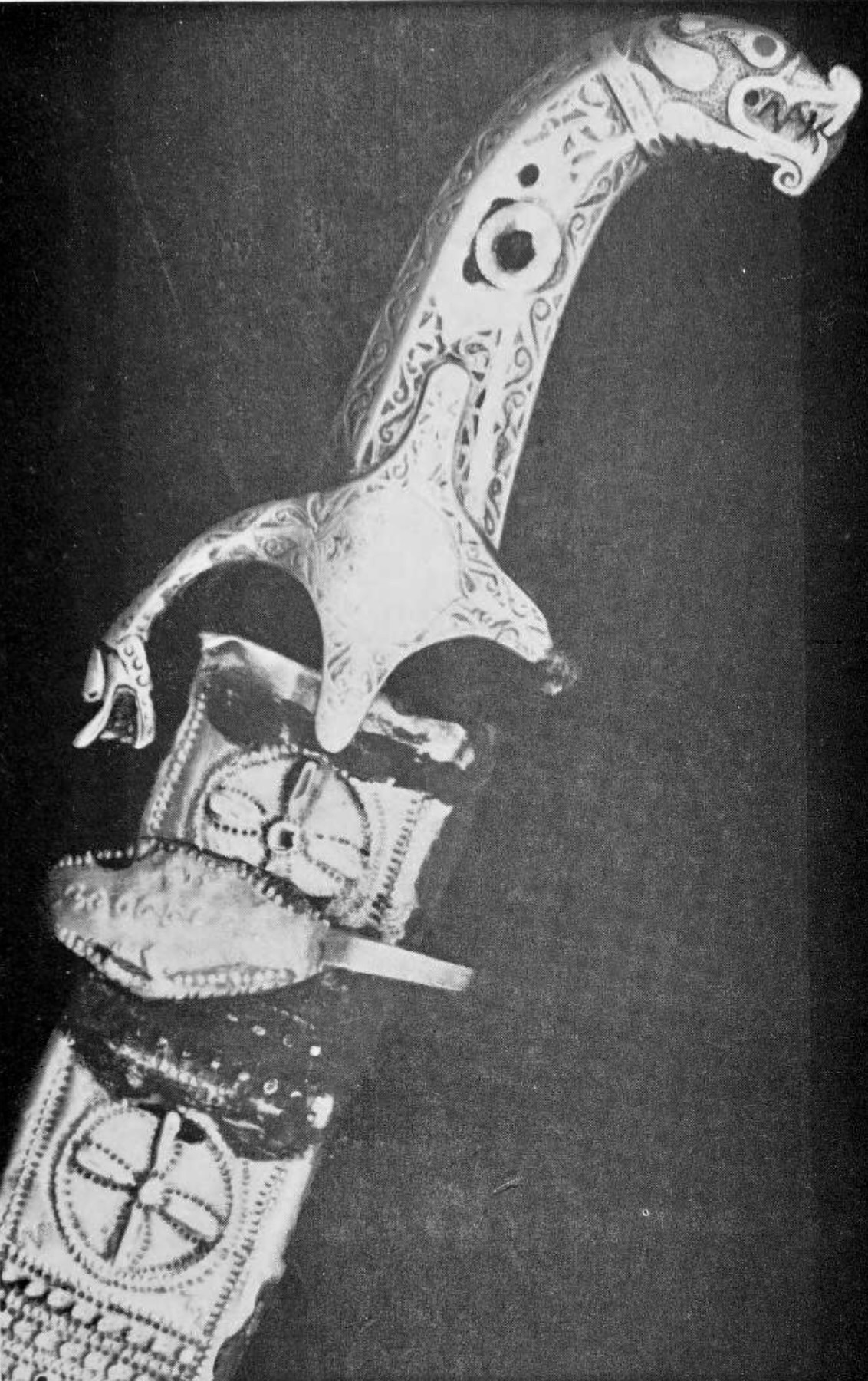
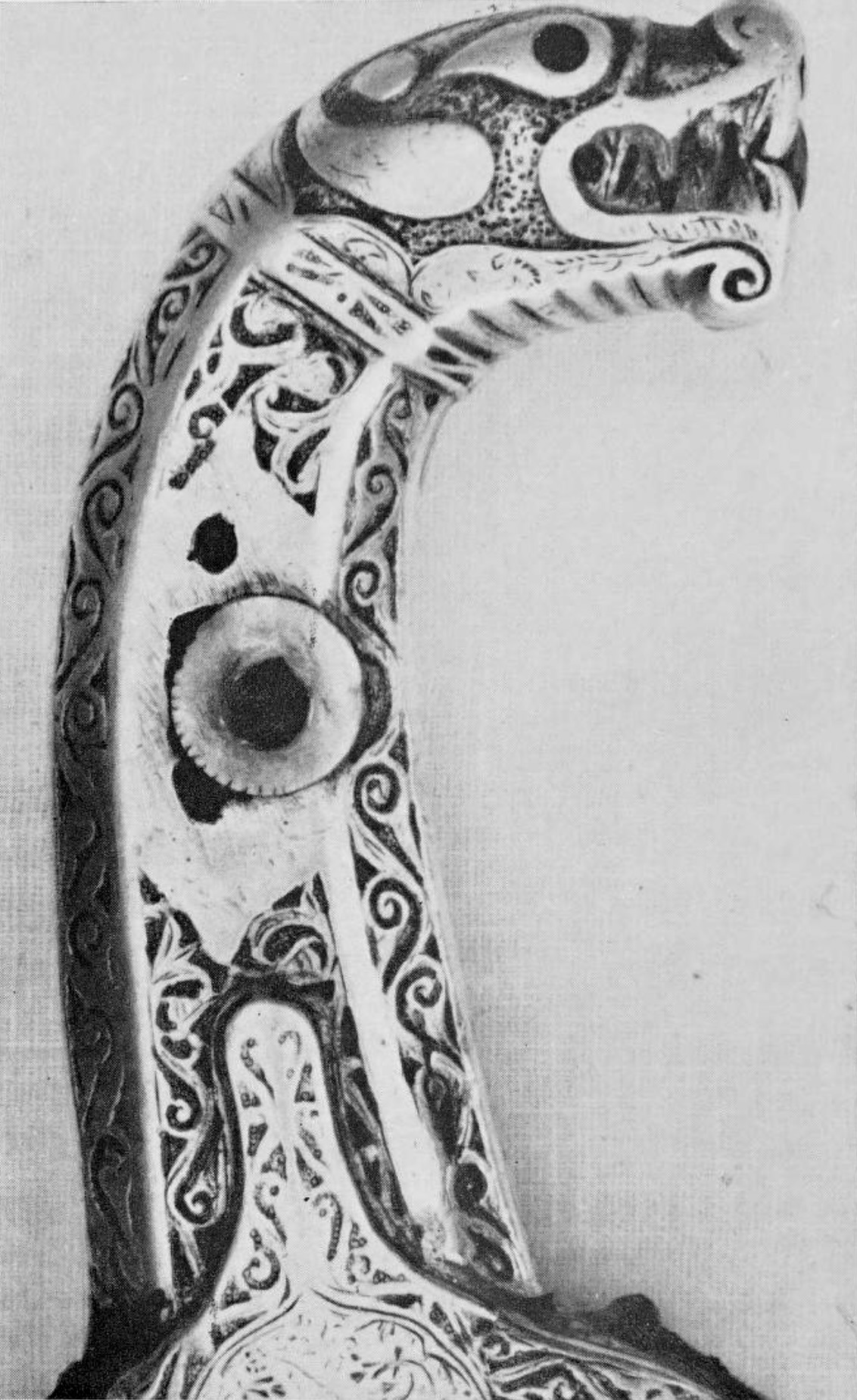
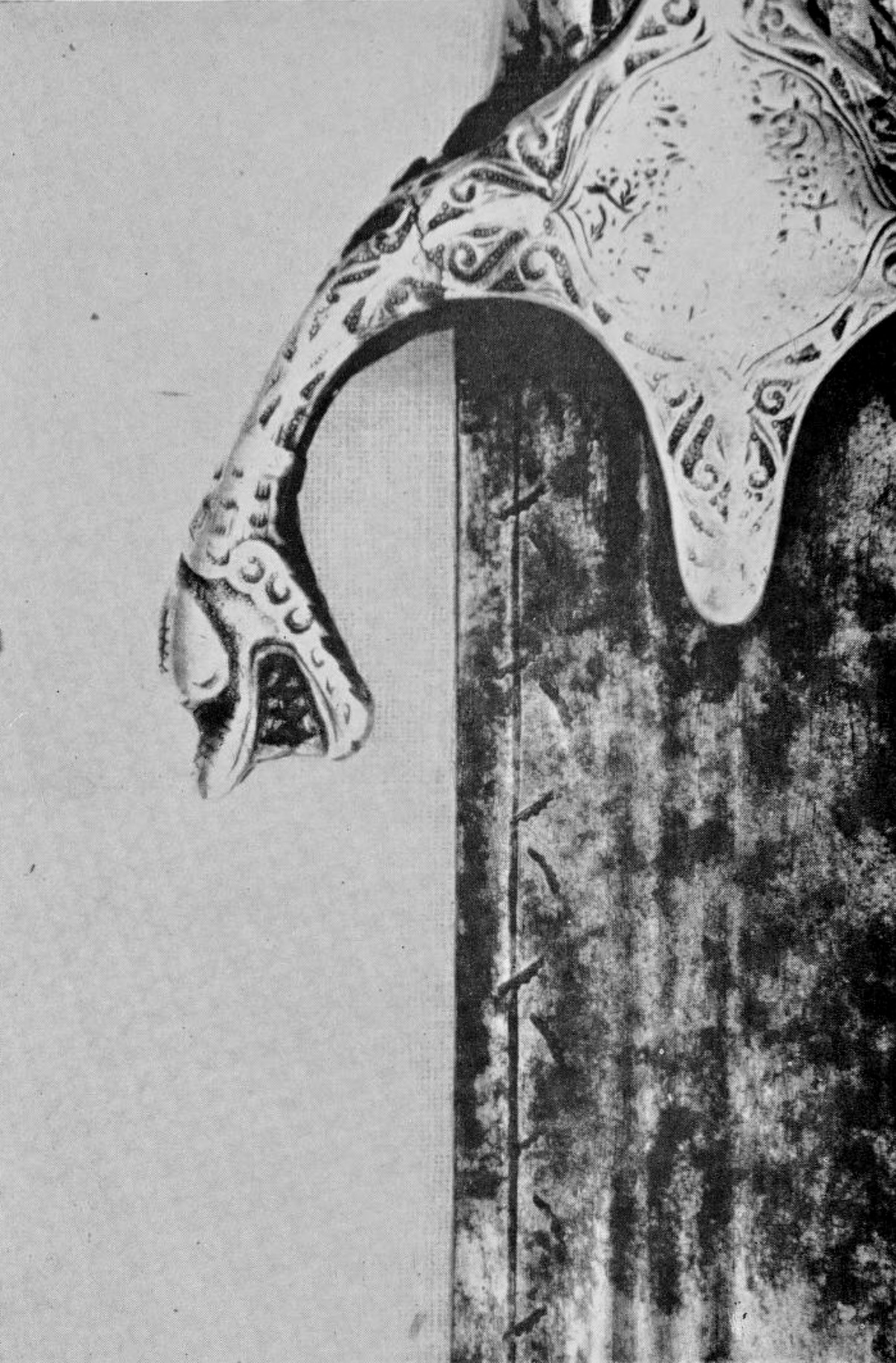
The Sword of Kanta, preserved since the 16th-century. Today, it serves as the official state sword of the Argungu Emirate in Kebbi State, Nigeria.

Due to his reputation as a champion boxer, Kanta attracted a sizable following and soon set his sights on overthrowing the ruling Fulani Magaji of the village. With the support of his followers, he successfully led a rebellion that resulted in the Magaji's death, after which he assumed leadership. Rather than adopting the title of Magaji, Kanta took on the more prestigious title of Sarki ('king' or 'chief'). Some accounts, however, suggest that he rejected any formal title, stating: "It is under my own name that I shall go, and the world shall soon learn to recognise the meaning of Kanta." Kanta appointed his advisers and granted them the titles of Kokani, Inname, Galadima, and Dikko, which have persisted to this day.

The Rima River Valley, where Kanta had established himself, was located in the debatable lands between Hausaland in the east and the Songhai Empire in the west. When Askia the Great launched his campaign to conquer the Hausa states in 1513, Kanta joined his forces and quickly rose to prominence as a barde (captain) in the Songhai army.

Two years into the Songhai campaign to subjugate Hausaland, Kanta marched alongside Askia Muhammad in an expedition against the desert state of Aïr. The campaign was successful, and Aïr was annexed into the Songhai Empire. However, Kanta became dissatisfied with his share of the spoils and decided to revolt. According to the Tarikh al-Sudan:

Kanta on returning with the prince from his expedition against Agades hoped to receive, on arrival in his country, his share of the spoils which had been taken. Disappointed in this, he mentioned the matter to the Dendi-Fari (note: this is not the name of a person, but the title of an officer) who replied, "If you make to the prince a claim of such a kind you will get yourself treated as a rebel." Kanta made no reply. Then when his followers came to find them and said to him, "Where is our share of the spoils? We have not seen it yet. Why do you not claim it?" he replied, "I have asked for it and the Dendi-Fari assured me that if I persisted in claiming it I should be treated as a rebel. Now I do not want to be the only one treated as a rebel, if you will support me I will make a claim?" "Good," they cried, "we will be treated as rebels as well as you." After this Kanta approached the Dendi-Fari, renewed his request and received a refusal. The rebellion broke out at once.

In response, the Askia immediately dispatched an army to suppress the uprising, but Kanta successfully repelled it, securing his independence and marking the establishment of Kebbi, the last of the Hausa states to emerge. Following his victory, Kanta launched his own campaigns to expand his domain. To the north, he conquered Asben and Aïr; to the south, Nupe and Borgu; to the east, Zamfara and Zazzau; and to the west, Arewa and Zaberma. He seized control of Gobir, Katsina, Kano, Zazzau, and other nearby states, most of which had been conquered by Askia the Great. At its height, Kebbi stretched from the Niger River to the Sahara Desert, with Kanta successfully resisting both the Songhai Empire to the west and the Bornu Empire to the east. Kanta reportedly used a copper-prowed canoe manned by fifty oarsmen to travel across the vast network of towns he ruled during the seasonal floods.

The Songhai Empire continued its campaign to reclaim Kebbi but its attempts proved futile. Following a crushing defeat inflicted by Kanta's forces, Askia Muhammad Benkan (r. 1531–1537) barely escaped with his life. With its military efforts exhausted, Songhai was ultimately forced to make peace with Kebbi.

=== War with Bornu ===
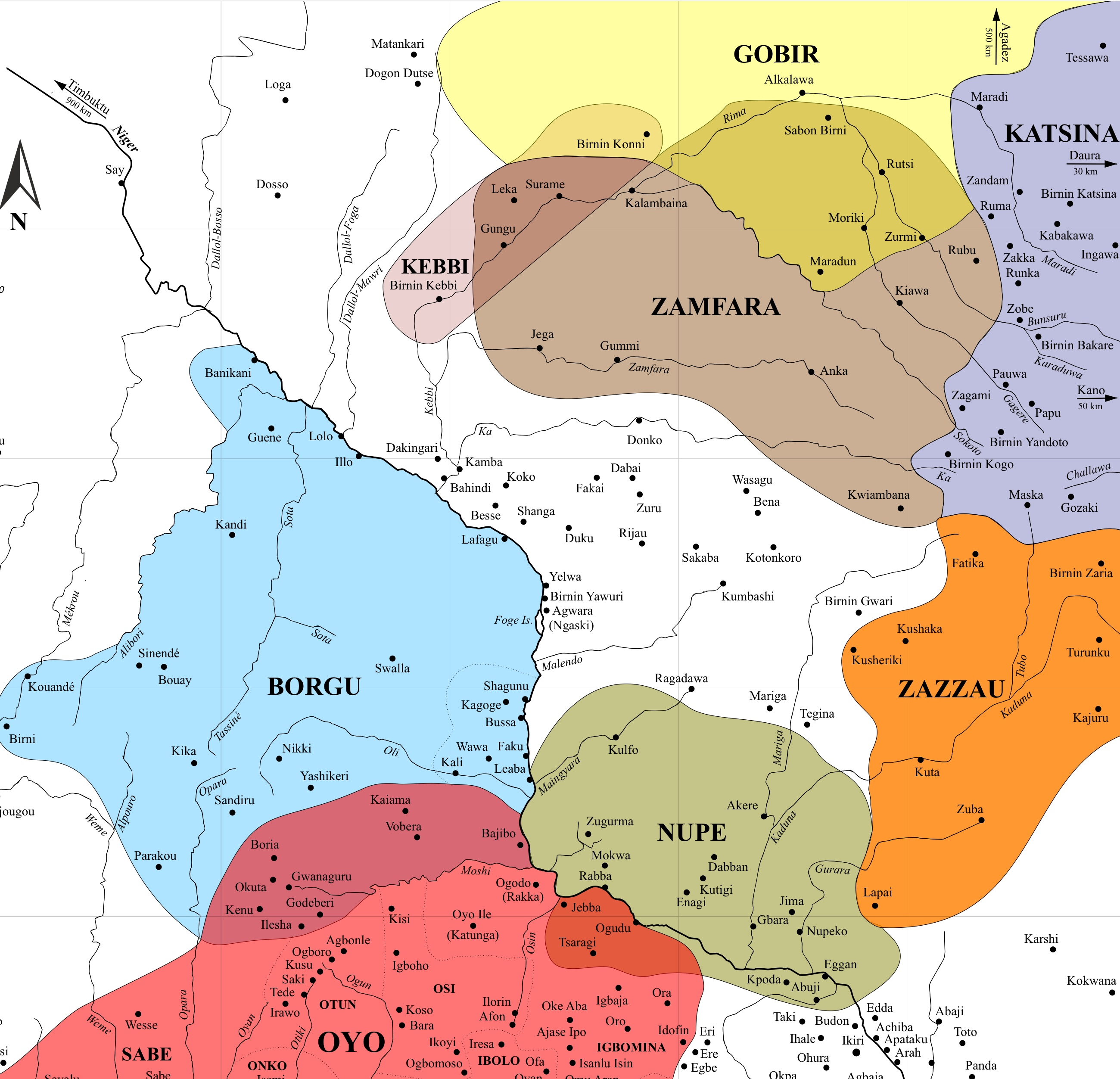
Map of western Hausaland in 1760. In the early 18th century, the Kebbi Empire fragmented following a rebellion by Zamfara, Gobir, and Agadez, which had formed an alliance against their overlord.

Although no detailed records of Kanta's wars exist, it is known that one of his most formidable adversaries was the Kanem-Bornu Empire, once the suzerain of Hausaland. The Mais of Bornu viewed with alarm the rise of Kanta's small but impressive empire, who saw it as a direct challenge to their dominance over the trans-Saharan trade routes. One of their most famous encounters took place during the reign of either Mai Idris Katakarmabi (r. 1504–1526) or Mai Ali II (r. 1545–1546). The Bornu army marched across Hausaland, pursuing Kanta's forces all the way back to the Kebbi capital, Surame. There, the Kebbawa mounted a fierce defense against the besieging forces, though they suffered heavy casualties.

As the Bornu army prepared for a final assault on the walls of Surame, they were met with a surprising sight. The defenders stood resolutely at their posts, each grinning confidently at the approaching enemy. Unknown to the Bornu forces, many of these defenders were actually dead soldiers, propped up in their places. Kanta had slit their lips to create the illusion that they were grinning at the attackers. The unsettling sight of the seemingly confident, grinning soldiers made the Bornu commander believe that the Kebbawa vastly outnumbered his forces. Fearing that his army was at a disadvantage, he called off the assault, lifted the siege, and withdrew his troops. This event is the origin of the Hausa phrase "dariya ba loto," meaning "laughter without end."

The rivalry between Kebbi and the Kanem-Bornu Empire persisted throughout Kanta's reign, intensifying over time. In one of their battles, Mai Muhammad Aminami reportedly fielded an army of about 100,000 men against Kanta's forces. This ongoing conflict may have influenced Mai Muhammad's decision to enter into an alliance with Turgut Reis, Pasha of Tripoli, in the 1550s.

=== Kanta's fortified towns ===
Kanta established and fortified several towns, including three capitals. After conquering the settlement that would become Birnin Kebbi, alongside his wife Makulo (Ayeshe), an Aïr princess, he constructed his first capital, Birnin Leka. This city was formed by merging nine separate settlements, which he then fortified with defensive walls.

Another notable town founded by Kanta was Gungu, meaning "the oasis." The ruins of its massive stone and laterite walls remain visible about thirty miles west of Sokoto. According to Kebbi tradition, Makulo, who was of royal lineage, became resentful of taking second place to Magajiya Lame, Kanta's first wife, whose parents were commoners (talakawa). In protest, Makulo fled west of Gungu, resting her head against a lone baobab tree and weeping. Seeing his beloved wife inconsolable, Kanta ordered a house to be built for her at that very spot, around which a new town soon emerged. To maintain balance, Kanta also founded Silame, a third walled town to the north, for his senior wife Lame.

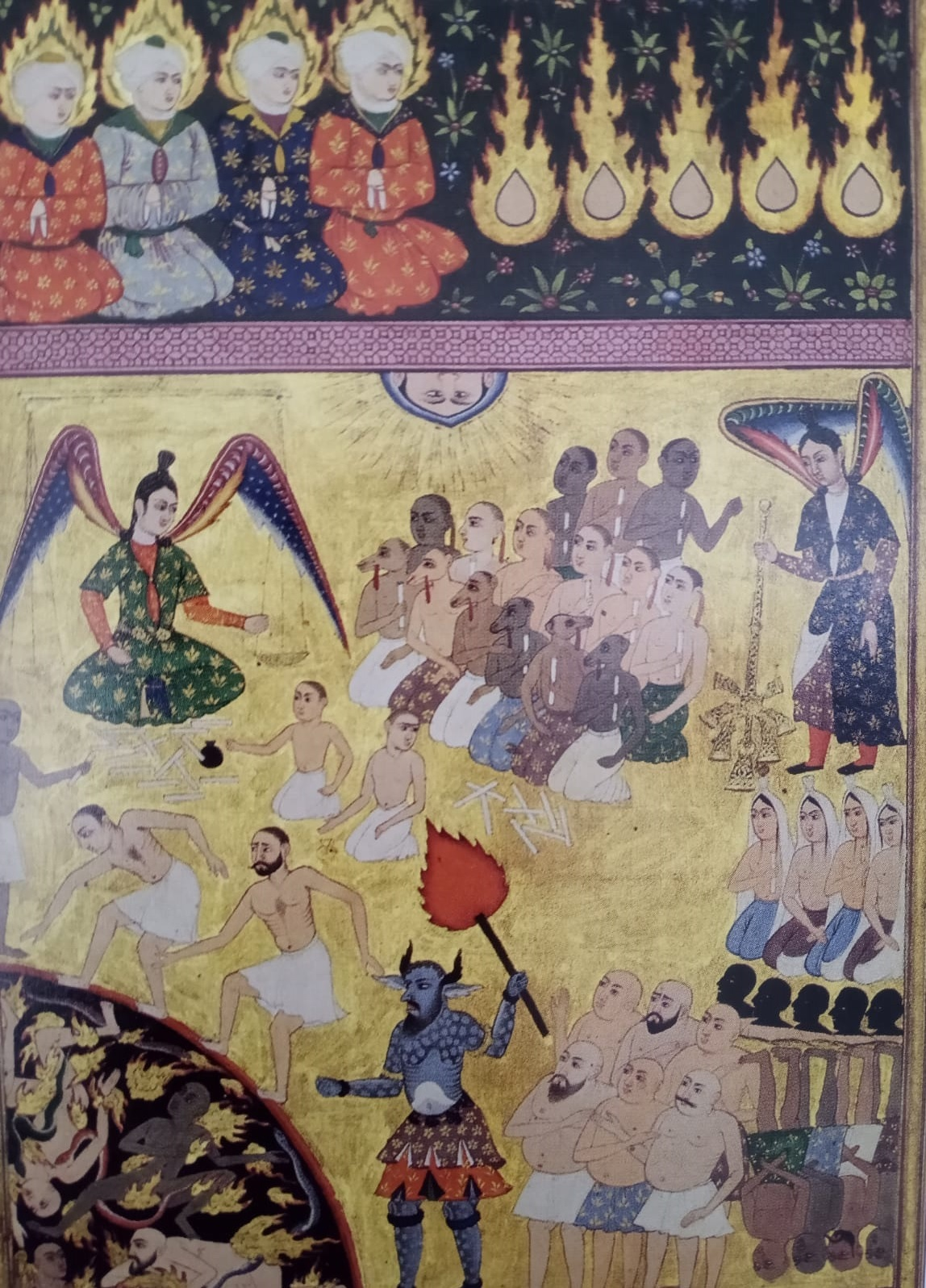
The name Siradi derives from As-Sirāt, an Islamic concept of a bridge that all departed spirits must cross after death—the good reaching Jannah (paradise) and the evil falling into Jahannam (hell).

Kanta's most well-known city was Surame, his final capital. He commanded tribute in both men and wealth from the states under his rule. His Tuareg subjects, having "incurred his displeasure," were punished by being forced to draw water from their distant desert homeland of Agadez. Similarly, when the Nupe people delayed their tribute, Kanta ordered them to mix their portion of Surame's forty-foot walls using shea butter instead of water. This section of the walls became especially strong, with many remnants still standing today.

At its peak, Surame was a vast metropolis, consisting of seven concentric towns, each with seven gates. There were stables for cavalry at nearly all forty-nine gates, except those of the innermost town.

Kanta's main palace at Surame remains a site of reverence and legend. Local myths claim that after nightfall, within the city's deserted walls, the beating of ghostly drums and the neighing of supernatural horses can still be heard. A well near the palace entrance was said to have a chain that rattled on its own every Friday, the same day Kanta would lead his pet black ox and black he-goat on a weekly walk around the city walls, to the awestruck terror of his people.

To the east of the palace, across a dry moat, stood the Siradi. This section of Surame's outer walls narrowed to eighteen inches for a length of about thirty feet. When a case was brought before him and Kanta was uncertain of a man's guilt or innocence, he would order the accused to cross the narrow passage. Those who succeeded were declared innocent and set free, while those who failed fell to the sharpened stakes, red-hot embers, or wild beasts and were deemed to have been guilty.

== Death ==
Years after the failed Bornu siege of Surame, Kanta launched a retaliatory campaign, marching his army to Bornu. It is said that he won seven pitched battles against the Mai's army, though he was halted just short of reaching the capital. On his return to Surame, Kanta was wounded in a skirmish at Rimin dan Ashita, a settlement near Ingawa in Katsina, where he was struck by a poisoned arrow. He succumbed to his injuries at Jiruwa.

To keep the location of his final resting place a secret, Kanta's remains were transported back to Kebbi, with twelve tombs constructed along the way to obscure the true site of his burial. His vast wealth is believed to have been buried beneath a large, flat-topped hill near Gungu.
