= Gwandu =

- LGA and town
- Nickname: TA ABDULLAHI
- Interactive map of Gwandu
- Location within Nigeria
- Coordinates: 12°30′8″N 4°38′33″E
- Country: Nigeria
- State: Kebbi State
- Demonym: Gwandawa (plural)
- Time zone: UTC+1 (WAT)

Gwandu, also called Gando, is a town and local government area in Kebbi State. Established by the founder of the Kebbi Kingdom, Muhammadu Kanta, the settlement was used as royal farmland (gandu) by the kingdom's rulers for centuries. Following the founding of the Sokoto Caliphate in the 19th century and the decline of Kebbi, Gwandu became a co-capital of the Caliphate, from which its Emirs oversaw the western and southern territories. The capital of the Gwandu Emirate was later changed to Birnin Kebbi in 1906.

== History ==
The name "Gwandu" derives from the Hausa word gandu, which translates to "royal farmlands." The town's origins can be traced back to its earlier days as a small village under the leadership of the royal farmer of Kanta Kotal, who was the first King of Kebbi who reigned from 1517 to 1561. Over time, the village developed and expanded, eventually becoming a town. One of the factors contributing to the growth of Gwandu was its favorable geographical location and the presence of fertile lands. The area boasted rich pasturelands, which attracted Fulani pastoralists to settle there.

After the Kebbi expedition during the Sokoto jihad, Gwandu emerged as a significant and permanent base for Usman dan Fodio and his followers. Recognizing the strategic importance of the town, Muhammad Bello ordered the construction of a protective wall around the town in 1806. This defensive wall aimed to fortify the city and enhance its security against potential external threats. Although Usman eventually departed from Gwandu, the town retained its significance within the context of the jihad. It became the capital of the newly established Gwandu emirate under the leadership of Abdullahi dan Fodio. The geographical location of Gwandu, nestled in a valley with surrounding ridges, provided natural advantages for defense against external attacks. The town's topography further contributed to its status as a stronghold.

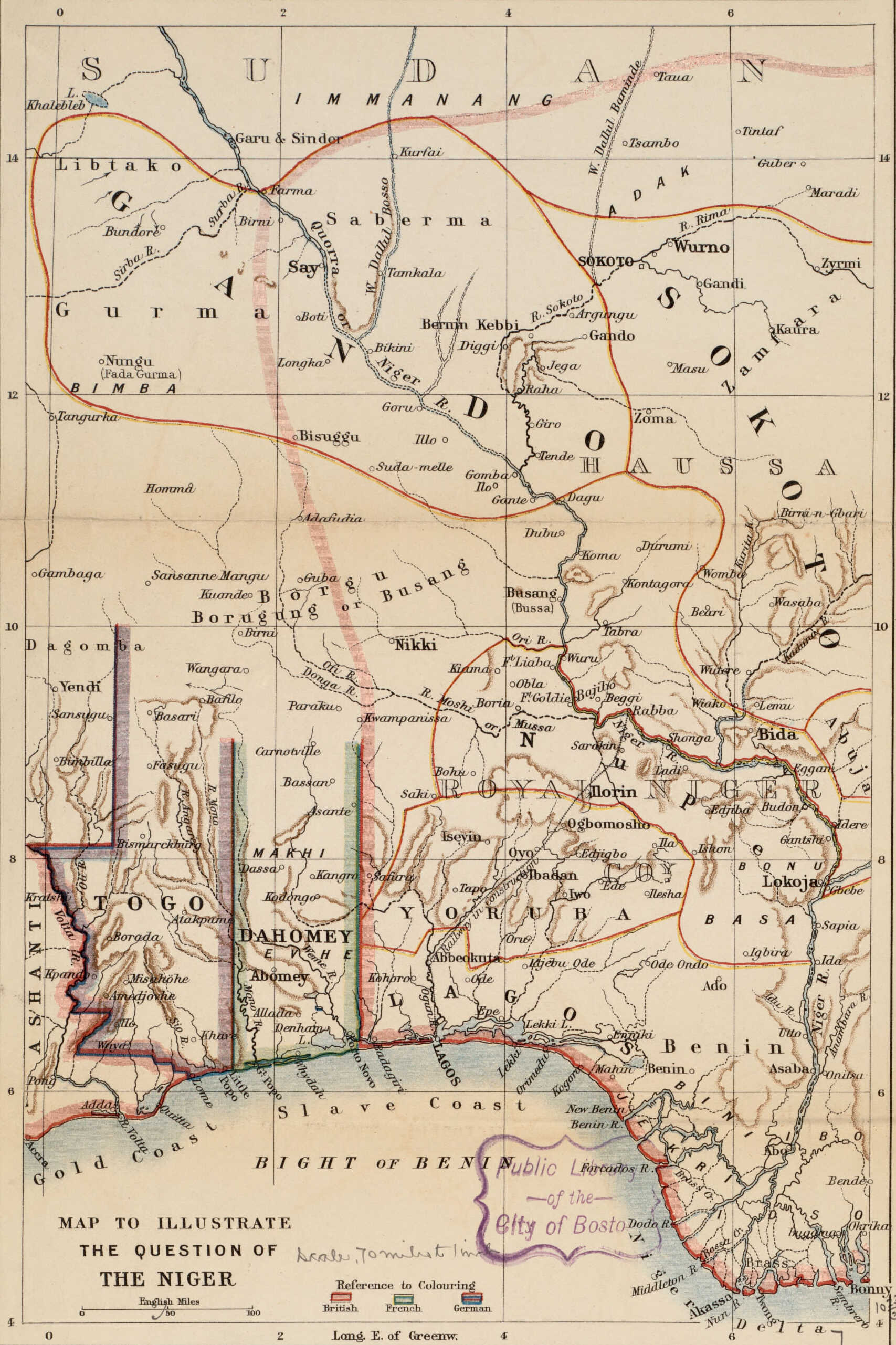
An 1898 map of the Gwandu Emirate

== Climate ==
In contrast to the dry season, which is hot and partially cloudy, the wet season is oppressively hot and cloudy.
