= Rima River =

River in Nigeria

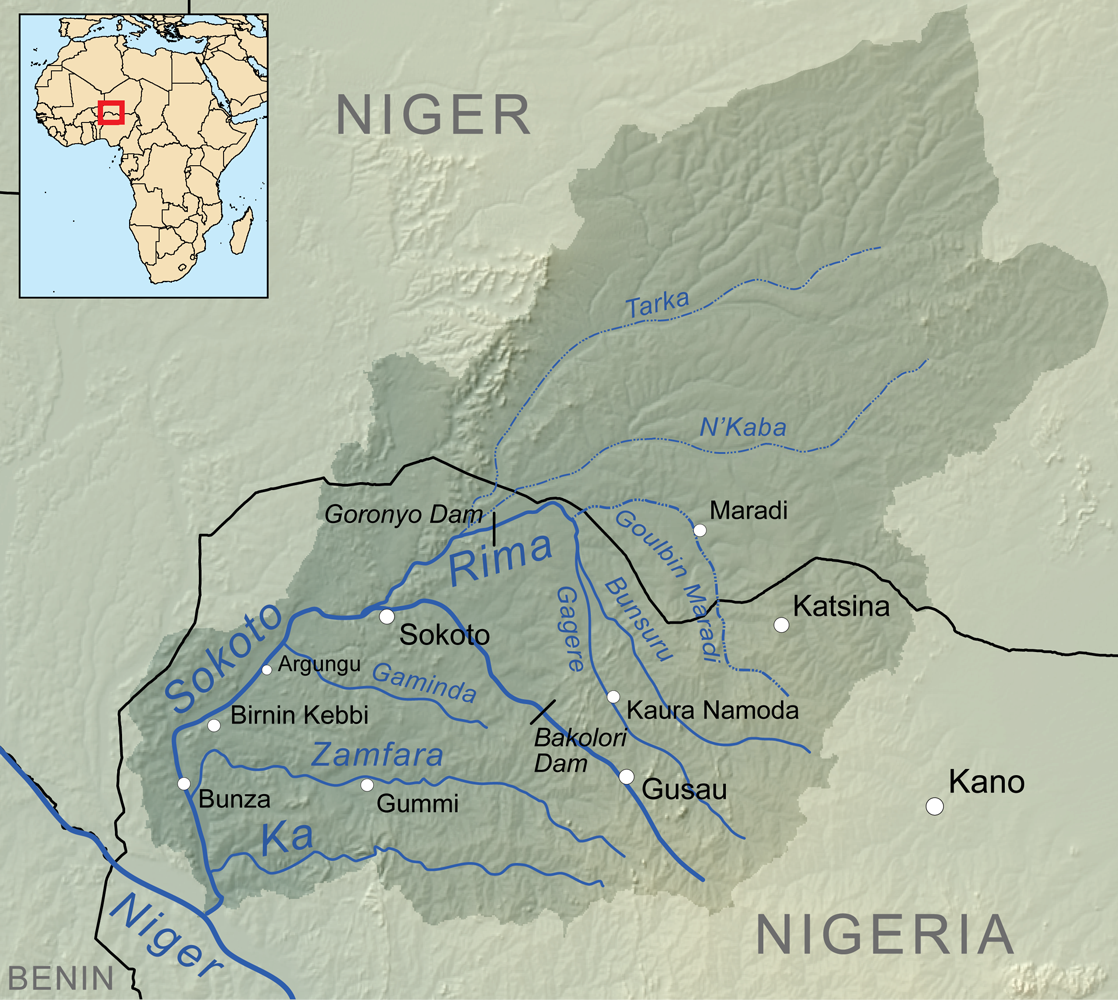
Map of the Sokoto River drainage basin

The Rima River is a river in northern Nigeria. At its northernmost point it is joined by the Goulbi de Maradi river. It runs southwest and joins the Sokoto River near Sokoto, then continues south to the Niger River. The upper Rima is a seasonal river and flows only during the rainy season. The Zauro polder project, a major irrigation scheme, has been planned for many years. It would irrigate 10,572 hectares (26,120 acres) of farmland in the Rima floodplain between Argungu and Birnin Kebbi.

== Pollution ==
Sokoto-Rima River is a significant wellspring of water supply, domesticated animals watering also, water system and fisheries assets to the networks living around it. Surface run-off and erosion are the sources of pollutants discharge into the rivers. Direct human disposal of waste products, industrialization and other agricultural activities at different segments of the rivers no doubt accentuate pollution stress on the aquatic environments and endanger the lives of fisheries resources in Rima River.
