= Tesker =

- Commune and village
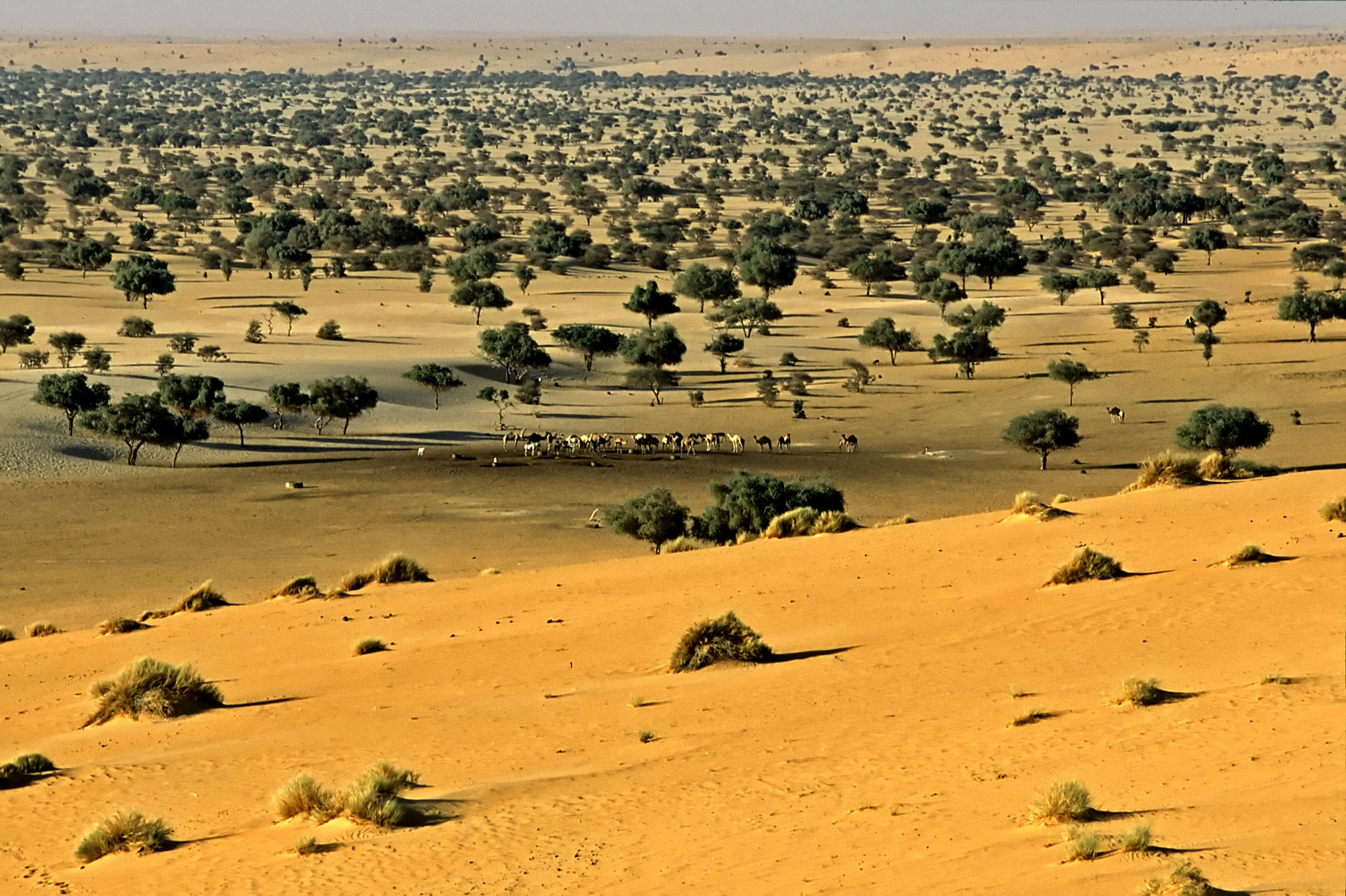

- Location in Niger
- Coordinates: 14°35′05″N 9°13′00″E
- Country: Niger
- Region: Zinder
- Department: Gouré

Area
  - Total: 26,748 sq mi (69,278 km^{2})

Population (2012 census)
  - Total: 37,132
  - Density: 1.3882/sq mi (0.53599/km^{2})
- Time zone: UTC+1 (WAT)

Tesker or Tasker is a village and rural commune in Niger. As of 2012, it had a population of 37,132 people. It is the birthplace of musician Mamane Barka (b. 1958). The sparsely populated commune extends over a wide area and spans two major regions: the Sahel region in the south and the Sahara desert in the north. In the northeast, it rises up to a height of 710 metres (2,330 ft) at the Termit Massif. It is bordered by Fachi and Tabelot in the north, N'Gourti to the east, Alakoss, Kellé and N'Guelbély to the south and Tenhya to the west. The municipality is divided into 36 administrative villages, one traditional village, three hamlets, 29 camps and 144 watering places.

== History ==
During the elections in the early 1990s, the vote from Tesker had to be cancelled as only 1,203 out of 8,785 voters were able to cast votes as a result of serious logistical problems. New elections had to be organised for Tesker and the PNDS eventually won the election. The rural community of Tesker emerged as an administrative unit in 2002 as part of a nationwide administrative reform. In November 2004, the government's High Commission for the Restoration of Peace hosted a reconciliation forum in the town.

== Demographics ==
There were 24,703 inhabitants in Tesker, according to the 2001 census, and 37,132 inhabitants in 2012. Arabs live in the north of the rural community, and members of the Tuareg and Fulani subgroups such as the Kanimatane, Bororo'en, Dabanko'en, Uda'en, Tuntumanko'en and Wodaabe are residents as well. A 2004 government investigation looked at abuse against civilians by security forces, while a 2005 reconciliation agreement was secured by the Government's High Commission for the Restoration of Peace after fighting ensued between Tuareg and Toubou communities in 2002 and 2003.

== Economy and infrastructure ==
The main town of Tesker has a military installation and a large cattle market. The main occupation is pastoral farming.
