= Tarka, Niger =

- Commune
- Location in Niger
- Coordinates: 14°12′15″N 8°49′54″E
- Country: Niger
- Region: Zinder Region
- Department: Belbédji Departement

Area
  - Commune: 3,542 sq mi (9,173 km^{2})

Population (2012 census)
  - Commune: 96,452
  - Density: 27.23/sq mi (10.51/km^{2})
  - Urban: 6,310
- Time zone: UTC+1 (WAT)

Tarka, Niger is a village and rural commune in Niger. It is located in the Belbédji Departement of the Zinder Region. As of 2012 the commune had a population of 96,452.

== Geography ==
Tarka is in the Sahel biome. The neighboring municipalities are Ingall in the northwest, Aderbissinat in the north, Tenhya in the northeast, Gangara in the east, Falenko in the southeast, El Allassane Maïreyrey in the south, Tagriss in the southwest and Gababedji in the west. The municipality is divided into 177 administrative villages, 54 traditional villages, 94 hamlets, 59 warehouses and 23 water points. The main town of the rural community is the administrative village Belbédji (also: Belbéji, Belbégi).

Through the municipality the around 300 kilometer east-west Tarka Valley is situated.

== History ==
The French colonial administration established a canton in Tarka in 1943. The Tarka valley formed its northern boundary to an area inhabited by nomads. In Belbédji in 1988 an administrative post ("poste administratif") was set up. The commune of Tarka decreased in size during a national administrative reform in 2002. In 2011, Tarka was no longer part of the Tanout Department and was part of the newly formed Belbédji Department.

== Demographics ==
In the 2001 census Tarka had 63 848 inhabitants. For the year 2012 96,452 inhabitants were counted. In Tarka live members of the primarily agriculture based Hausa subgroup Gobirawa, the remote pasture Fulani subgroups Katchinanko'en, Oudah'en and Wodaabe, and the Tuareg subgroups Ichiriffen, Ikanawan, Imouzgou, Imouzwagan, Imuzzurag, Inesseliman, Kel Gariss, Kel Gress, Kel Iferwane and Tegama.

== Economy and infrastructure ==
The north of the municipality is within a zone in which grazing is the predominant source of income. The South is in the field of agropastoralism. Since 22 May 2000 there has been a local citizen radio in Tarka.

== Notable people ==
Prime minister Hamid Algabid was born in the village of Belbedji in 1941.
