= Tenhya =

- Commune and village
- Location in Niger
- Coordinates: 14°07′02″N 8°51′23″E
- Country: Niger
- Region: Zinder
- Department: Tanout

Area
  - Total: 4,222 sq mi (10,935 km^{2})

Population (2012 census)
  - Total: 31,057
  - Density: 7.3559/sq mi (2.8401/km^{2})
- Time zone: UTC+1 (WAT)

Tenhya is a village and rural commune in Niger. As of 2012, it had a total population of 31,057 people. Tenhya is located in the northern Sahel. The neighboring municipalities are Aderbissinat in the northwest, the northeast Tabelot, Tesker to the east and south and Tarka in the west. The rural community of Tenhya was founded in 2002 as an administrative unit. The main ethnic groups are the Fulani subgroup Wodaabe and the Tuareg subgroups Ichiriffen, Imdan, Inesseliman, Kel Ates, Kel Iferwane and Ifoghas, mainly engaged in pastoral farming.
