= Yarda =

Coordinates: 14°45′56″N 8°32′03″E

Yarda is a village situated in Tanout Department, Zinder Region, Niger.
