= Termit =

Termit may refer to:

- P-15 Termit, a Soviet missile
- Termit, a Ukrainian unmanned ground vehicle
- Termit Massif, a mountain range in southeast central Niger
- Termit Massif Reserve, a nature reserve covering over 700,000 hectares of the Termit Massif

== See also ==
- Termite (disambiguation)
- Thermite
