= Dogo-Dogo =

Coordinates: 12°54′N 9°20′E

- Commune and village
- Interactive map of Dogo-Dogo
- Country: Niger
- Region: Zinder
- Department: Dungass

Area
  - Total: 201.4 sq mi (521.6 km^{2})
- Elevation: 1,161 ft (354 m)

Population (2012 census)
  - Total: 65,544
  - Density: 325.5/sq mi (125.7/km^{2})
- Time zone: UTC+1 (WAT)

Dogo-Dogo is a village and rural commune in the Dungass Department of the Zinder Region of Niger. As of 2012, it had a population of 65,544.
