= Dakoussa =

Coordinates: 13°52′N 8°49′E

- Commune and village
- Interactive map of Dakoussa
- Country: Niger
- Region: Zinder
- Department: Takeita

Area
  - Total: 343.4 sq mi (889.4 km^{2})

Population (2012 census)
  - Total: 61,779
  - Density: 179.9/sq mi (69.46/km^{2})
- Time zone: UTC+1 (WAT)

Dakoussa is a village and rural commune in the Takeita Department of the Zinder Region of Niger. As of 2012, it had a population of 61,779.
