= Malawa, Niger =

Coordinates: 13°01′53″N 9°36′54″E

- Commune and village
- Interactive map of Malawa, Niger
- Country: Niger
- Region: Zinder
- Department: Dungass

Area
  - Total: 433 sq mi (1,121 km^{2})

Population (2012 census)
  - Total: 88,954
  - Density: 205.5/sq mi (79.35/km^{2})
- Time zone: UTC+1 (WAT)

Malawa, Niger is a village and rural commune in the Dungass Department of the Zinder Region of Niger. As of 2012, it had a population of 88,954.
