= Boune =

Coordinates: 13°31′N 10°08′E

- Commune and village
- Interactive map of Boune
- Country: Niger
- Region: Zinder
- Department: Goure
- Elevation: 1,237 ft (377 m)

Population (2010)
  - Total: 65,544
- Time zone: UTC+1 (WAT)

Boune is a village and rural commune in the Goure Department of the Zinder Region of Niger.
