= Dungass Department =

Dungass
- Department
- Interactive map of Dungass
- Country: Niger
- Region: Zinder Region

Area
  - Total: 1,656 sq mi (4,288 km^{2})

Population (2012)
  - Total: 353,867
  - Density: 213.7/sq mi (82.52/km^{2})
- Time zone: UTC+1 (GMT 1)

Dungass is a department of the Zinder Region in Niger. Its administrative seat is the city of Dungass. As of 2012, the department had a total population of 353,867 people.

== History ==
The department goes back to the administrative post (poste administratif) of Dungass, which was established in 1988. In 2011, the administrative post was separated from the department of Magaria and elevated to the department of Dungass.

== Municipalities ==
Dungass Department is divided into three municipalities, listed with population as of the 2012 census:

- Dogo-Dogo 65,544
- Dungass 127,757
- Gouchi 71,612
- Malawa 88,954
