= Takeita Department =

Takeita
- Department
- Interactive map of Takeita
- Coordinates: 13°53′40″N 8°42′00″E
- Country: Niger
- Region: Zinder Region

Area
  - Total: 1,303 sq mi (3,374 km^{2})

Population (2012)
  - Total: 246,818
  - Density: 189.5/sq mi (73.15/km^{2})
- Time zone: UTC+1 (GMT 1)

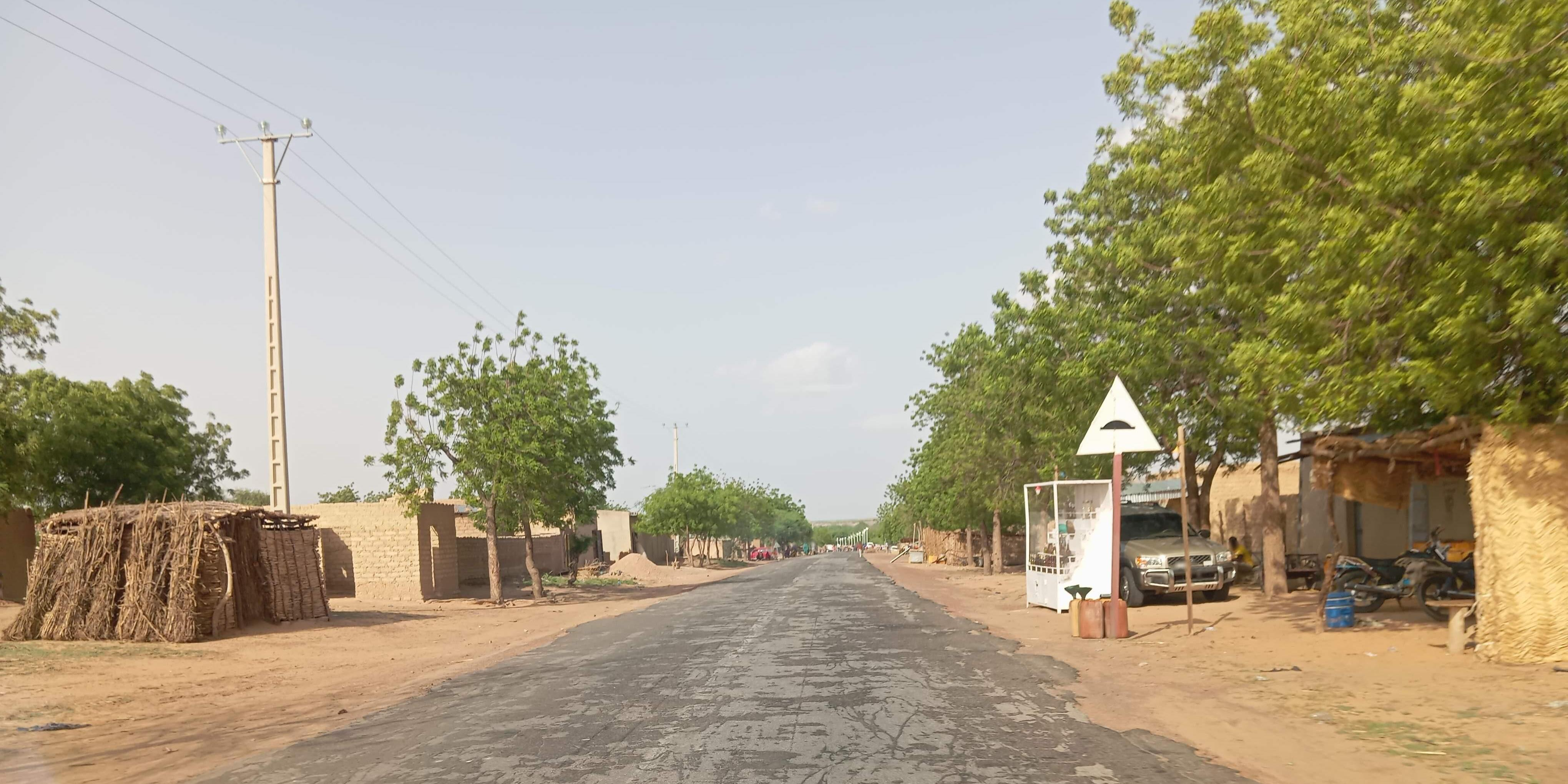
Takeita RN1

Takeita is a department of the Zinder Region in Niger. Its administrative seat is the city of Takieta. As of 2012, the department had a total population of 246,818 people.

== History ==
The department goes back to the administrative post (poste administratif) of Takeita, which was established in 1988. In 2011, the administrative post was separated from the department of Mirriah and elevated to the department of Takeita.

== Municipalities ==
Takeita Department is divided into three municipalities, listed with population as of 2012 census:

- Dakoussa 61,779
- Garagoumsa 69,028
- Tirmini 116,011
