= Gamou =

Coordinates: 14°20′N 9°55′E

- Commune and village
- Interactive map of Gamou
- Country: Niger
- Region: Zinder
- Department: Goure
- Time zone: UTC+1 (WAT)

Gamou is a village and rural commune in the Goure Department of the Zinder Region of Niger.
