= Goure Department =

Coordinates: 13°59′00″N 10°16′13″E

Goure
- Department
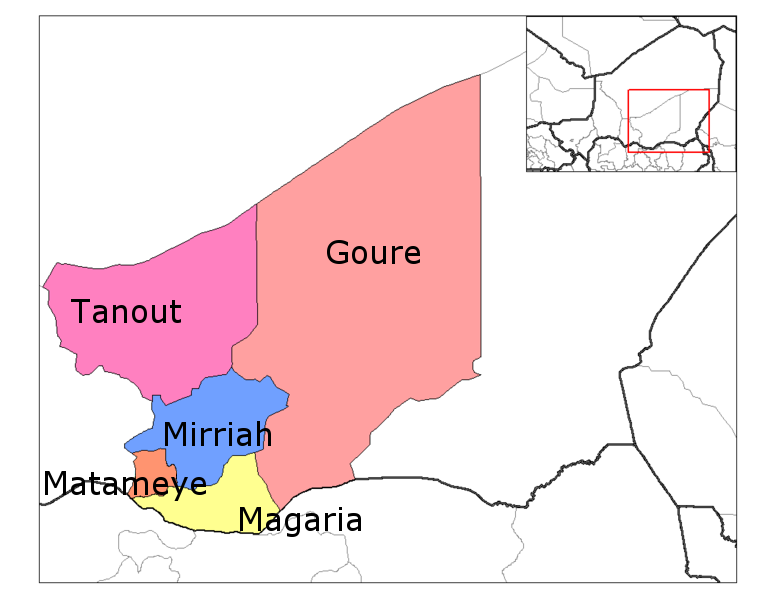
- Goure Department location in the region
- Country: Niger
- Region: Zinder Region

Area
  - Total: 8,000 sq mi (20,730 km^{2})

Population (2012 census)
  - Total: 327,818
  - Density: 40.96/sq mi (15.81/km^{2})
- Time zone: UTC+1 (GMT 1)

Goure is a department of the Zinder Region in Niger. Its capital lies at the city of Goure. As of 2012, the department had a total population of 327,818 people.

== Communes ==
- Alakoss
- Boune
- Gamou
- Goure
- Guidiguir
- Kelle
