= Guidiguir =

- Commune and village
- Location in Niger
- Coordinates: 13°40′N 9°50′E
- Country: Niger
- Region: Zinder
- Department: Goure

Area
  - Total: 844 sq mi (2,185 km^{2})

Population (2012 census)
  - Total: 62,731
  - Density: 74.36/sq mi (28.71/km^{2})
- Time zone: UTC+1 (WAT)

Guidiguir is a village and rural commune in the Goure Department of the Zinder Region of Niger. As of 2012, it had a population of 62,731.
