= Tanout =

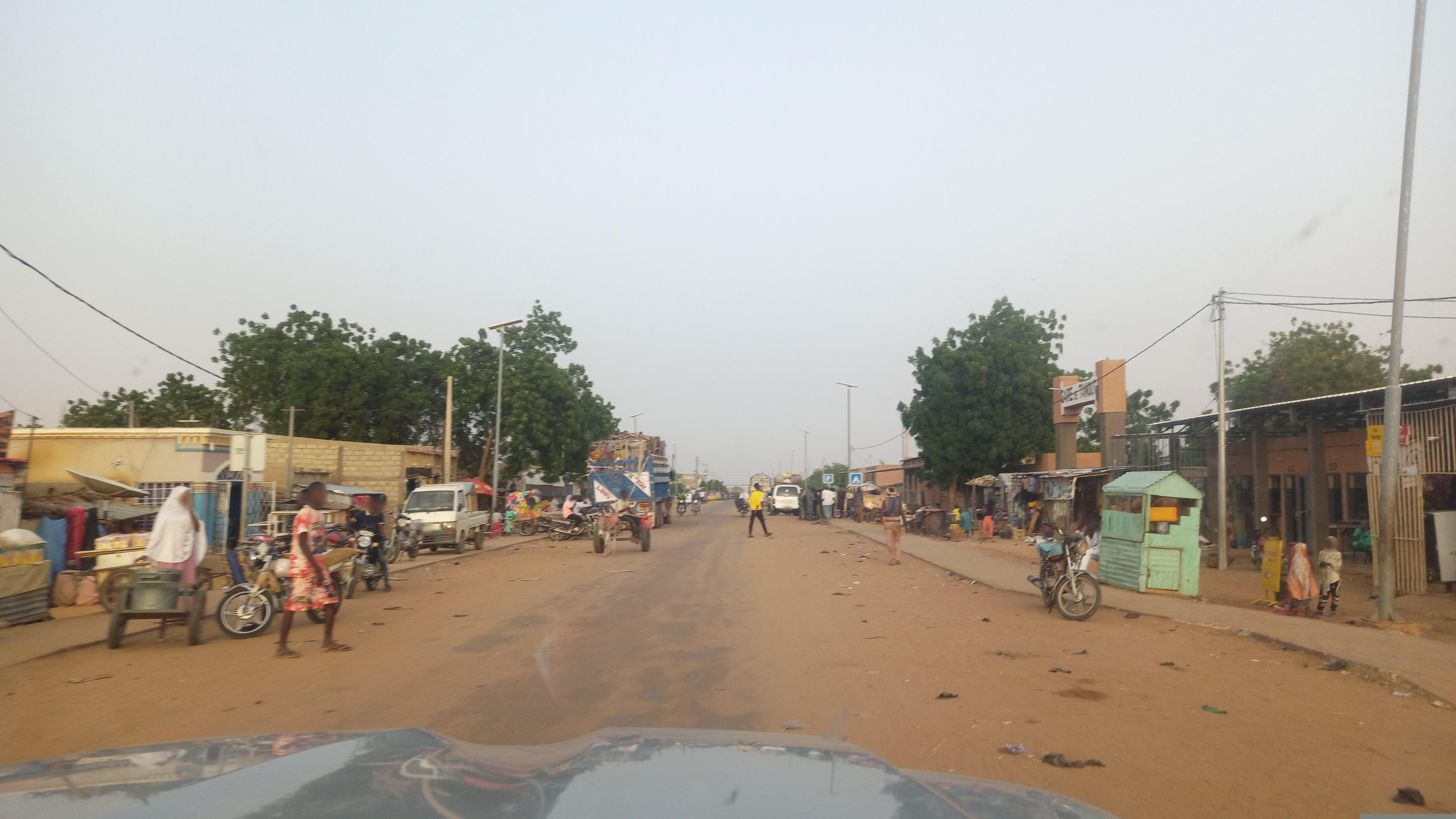

- Location in Niger
- Coordinates: 14°58′20″N 8°52′50″E
- Country: Niger
- Region: Zinder Region
- Departments of Niger: Tanout Department
- Elevation: 530 m (1,740 ft)

Population (2011)
  - City: 15,779
  - Metro: 134,074

Tanout is a town in southern Niger. It is in Zinder Region, Tanout Department, north of the city of Zinder. It is the administrative capital of Tanout Department.

The town is also home to a historic mosque, the Grand Mosque of Tanout, which dates back to the 19th century and is considered a cultural and architectural landmark of the region. The predominant ethnic group in Tanout is the Hausa people, who predominantly practice Islam as their religion.

== History ==
Since 1987, the Eden Foundation, an NGO aiming at providing trees for "direct seeding" to households in the surroundings, has been active in the town.

In early 2008, Tanout was the subject of a raid by Tuareg pro-autonomy rebels, in which 11 people, including the mayor, were abducted.

== Transport ==
Tanout Airport serves the town.
