= Garagoumsa =

Coordinates: 13°40′N 8°23′E

- Commune and village
- Interactive map of Garagoumsa
- Country: Niger
- Region: Zinder
- Department: Takeita

Area
  - Total: 243.6 sq mi (631.0 km^{2})

Population (2012 census)
  - Total: 69,028
  - Density: 283.3/sq mi (109.4/km^{2})
- Time zone: UTC+1 (WAT)

Garagoumsa is a village and rural commune in the Takeita Department of the Zinder Region of Niger. As of 2012, it had a population of 69,028.
