= Tanout Airport =

Airport in Niger

Coordinates: 15°00′04″N 008°46′13″E

Tanout Airport (ICAO: DRZT) is an airport serving Tanout in Zinder Region of southern Niger. It is 15 kilometres (9.3 mi) west of the city centre, and its runway is 950 metres (3,120 ft) by 45 metres (148 ft).
