= List of regions of Niger by Human Development Index =

This is a list of Regions of Niger by Human Development Index as of 2023. An HDI value is calculated for the Tillabéri Region and the city of Niamey combined.

Rank	Region	HDI (2023)
Low human development
1	Tillabéri (with Niamey)	0.512
2	Agadez	0.508
–	Niger	0.419
3	Maradi	0.403
4	Dosso	0.401
5	Diffa	0.386
6	Zinder	0.384
7	Tahoua	0.372
