= Ollelewa =

Coordinates: 14°30′N 8°38′E

- Commune and village
- Interactive map of Ollelewa
- Country: Niger
- Region: Zinder
- Department: Tanout

Area
  - Total: 964 sq mi (2,498 km^{2})

Population (2012 census)
  - Total: 116,895
  - Density: 121.2/sq mi (46.80/km^{2})
- Time zone: UTC+1 (WAT)

Ollelewa is a village and rural commune in the Tanout Department of the Zinder Region of Niger. As of 2012, it had a population of 116,895.
