= Belbédji Department =

Belbédji
- Department
- Location in Niger
- Coordinates: 15°07′N 7°48′E
- Country: Niger
- Region: Zinder Region

Area
  - Total: 3,542 sq mi (9,173 km^{2})

Population (2012)
  - Total: 96,452
  - Density: 27.23/sq mi (10.51/km^{2})
- Time zone: UTC+1 (GMT 1)

Belbédji is a department of the Zinder Region in Niger. Its administrative seat is the city of Belbédji. As of 2012, the department had a total population of 96,452 people.

== History ==
The department dates back to the administrative post (poste administratif) of Belbédji, which was established in 1988. In 2011, the administrative post was separated from the department of Tanout and became the department of Belbédji.
