= Gouchi =

Coordinates: 13°30′N 9°33′E

- Commune and village
- Interactive map of Gouchi
- Country: Niger
- Region: Zinder
- Department: Dungass

Area
  - Total: 470 sq mi (1,230 km^{2})

Population (2012 census)
  - Total: 71,612
  - Density: 151/sq mi (58.2/km^{2})
- Time zone: UTC+1 (WAT)

Gouchi is a village and rural commune in the Dungass Department of the Zinder Region of Niger. As of 2012, it had a population of 71,612.
