= Kelle, Niger =

Coordinates: 14°17′N 10°07′E

- Commune and village
- Interactive map of Kelle, Niger
- Country: Niger
- Region: Zinder
- Department: Goure

Area
  - Total: 2,613 sq mi (6,768 km^{2})

Population (2012 census)
  - Total: 74,425
  - Density: 28.48/sq mi (11.00/km^{2})
- Time zone: UTC+1 (WAT)

Kelle, Niger is a village and rural commune in the Goure Department of the Zinder Region of Niger. As of 2012, it had a population of 74,425.
