= Termite (disambiguation) =

A termite is an insect.

Termite may also refer to:

- Brother Termite, a novel by Patricia Anthony
- Termites from Mars, an animated cartoon
- The Termites, a UK pop group who in 1965 released a cover of The Rolling Stones' song "Tell Me"
- Termites (Τερμίτες), a Greek progressive rock group, originally named P.L.J. Band, composed of Antonis Mitzelos, Lavrentis Machairitsas, Pavlos Kikrilis and Dimitri Vassilakis
- The Termites, a psychobilly five-piece band from Scotland formed in 1985
- A nickname for the participants in Lewis Terman's study of gifted children
- termite, a deprecated terminal emulator

== See also ==
- Termit (disambiguation)
- Thermite, a mixture of metal and metal oxide powders.
