= Termit Massif =

Mountainous region in southeastern Niger

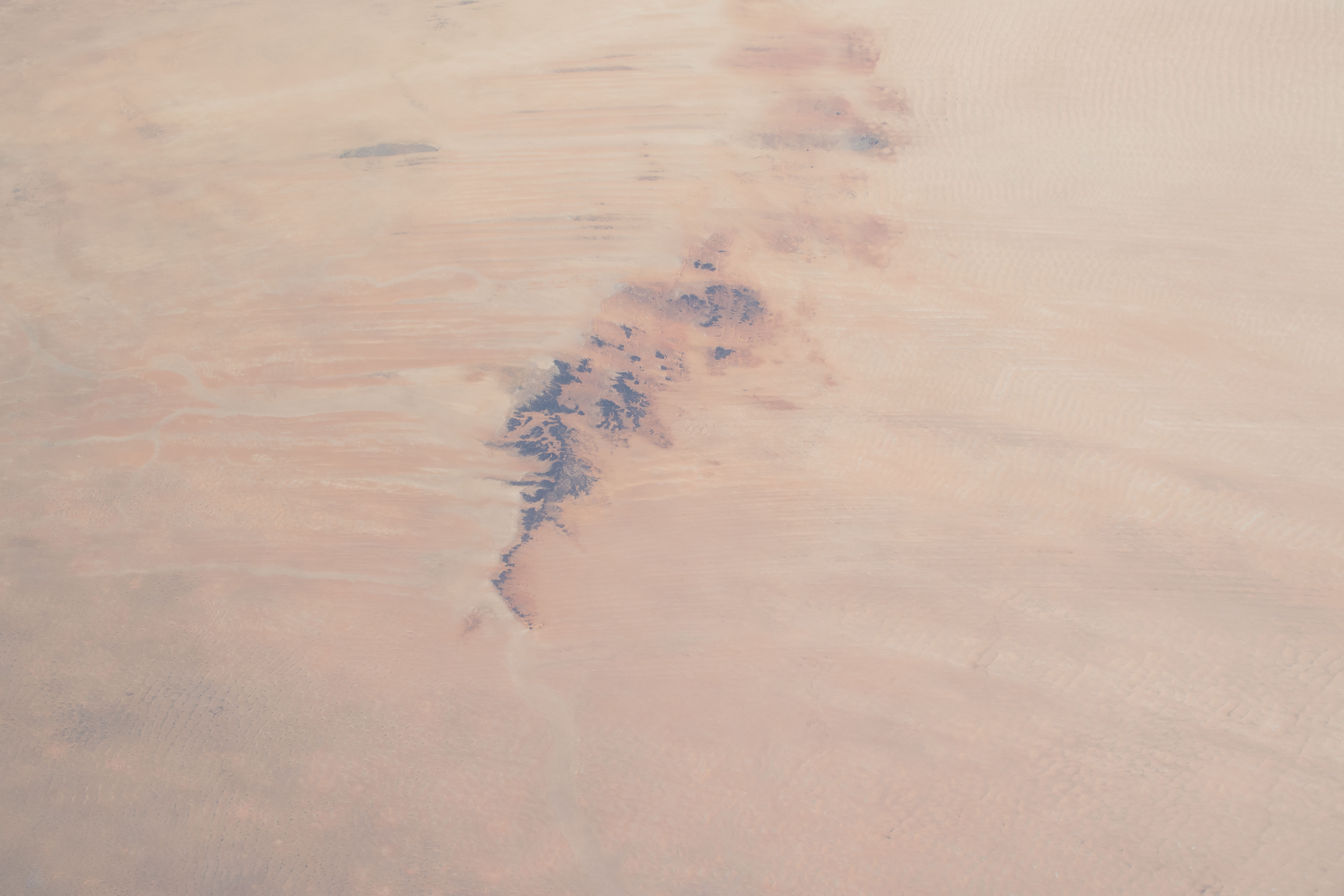
- Termit Massif visible from ISS

Highest point
- Coordinates: 16°03′N 11°21′E

Dimensions
- Length: 180 km (110 mi)
- Width: 40 km (25 mi)
- Area: 3,500 km^{2} (1,400 mi^{2})

Geography
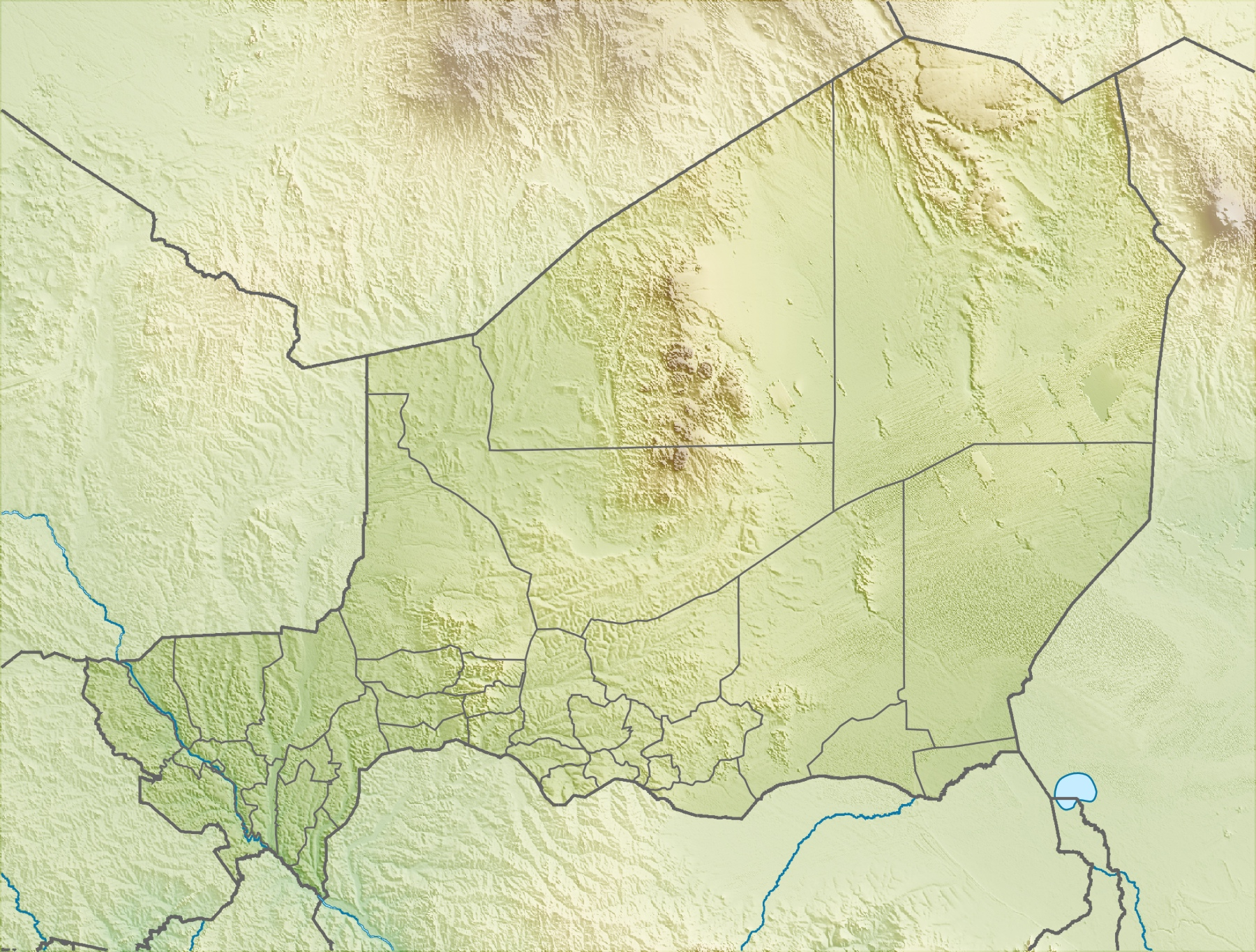
- Location within Niger
- Location: Zinder Region, Diffa Region
- Country: Niger

Geology
- Rock type: Sandstone

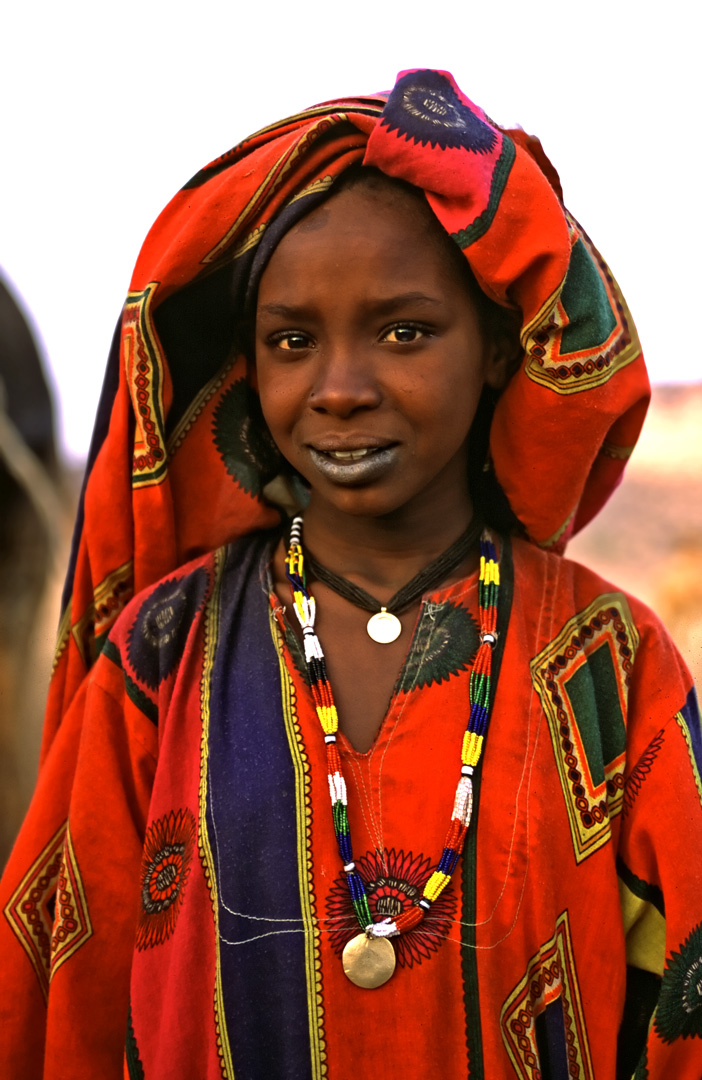
A woman in Termit

The Termit Massif (Termit Mountains or simply the Termit) is a mountainous region in south-eastern Niger. Just to the south of the dunes of Ténéré desert and the Erg of Bilma, the northern areas of the Termit, called the Gossololom, consist of black volcanic peaks rising from the surrounding seas of sand. The southern Termit is a roughly east–west ridge of heavily eroded black sandstone. Its foothills to the southwest are the Koutous hills.

== Location ==
The Termit Massif is located in the Tesker commune in the north-east of the Zinder region. Geographically, the Termit Massif is located in the western part of the Chad Basin. This is where the Sahel desert meets the Sahara. To the north and north-east lie the great sandy deserts of the Ténéré and to the east, behind the Tin-Toumma desert, the Grand Erg du Bilma. South of the mountains is the Dilia de Lagané valley, which runs in a straight line for 200 kilometres. The southern part of the range is characterised by rugged black sandstone formations. In the Gossolorom landscape to the north, isolated rocky islands of volcanic origin rise from the ochre-coloured sandy desert. The Termit massif receives less than 100 millimetres of rainfall per year. The dry season lasts from November to May, while the rainy season of the West African monsoon lasts from June to September.

In 1989, the Paris–Dakar Rally crossed the Termit Massif. In 2006, Niger proposed to UNESCO that the Termit Massif be included on the World Heritage List. Since 2012, it has been part of the Termit and Tin-Toumma Nature Reserve, one of the largest nature reserves on the planet's land surface.

== Geography ==
=== Topography ===
The Termit massif is a rocky outcrop running north–south at an altitude of 350-700m. It is mainly composed of black sandstone that is partially silted up, with a few islands of volcanic origin in its northern part, in the Gossololom region.

It is bounded by:

- to the north and north-west: the Ténéré desert
- to the east: the Tin-Toumma desert
- to the south and south-west: the transition zones between desert and Sahelian savannah

Termit occupies the northern part of the Gouré department, in the Zinder region.

=== Climate ===
The dry season lasts from November to May and the rainy season from June to September, bringing less than 100 mm of rainfall a year.

=== Fauna and flora ===
Mendes antelopes and dama gazelles live in the Termit Massif, both of which are threatened with extinction. There are also dorcas gazelles, fennecs, cheetahs, barbary sheep, jackals, birds and reptiles. In the 1970s, the wildlife in the Termit Massif was still largely intact, but populations have since declined sharply. The animals are particularly threatened by hunting parties from Dubai and Libya. The plant life in the Termit Massif includes umbrella acacias, toothbrush trees, panicle millet, Danthonia, indigofera and the shrub Leptadenia pyrotechnica.

== Human settlement ==
The small population of the Termit is mostly nomadic, with Toubou settlements in the north and east, and more Tuareg and Diffa Arabs to the west. Covering much of the north of the Zinder and Diffa Regions, there are few permanent settlements or all-weather roads in the area. Communities within the region include Termit Kaoboul in the south centre and Kandil Bouzou in the southeast. Neighbouring settlements include Tasker, Abourak and Haltouma to the southwest; Béla Hardé to the southeast, and Koussa Arma, Oyou Bezezé Denga, and Agadem on the eastern fringe. Settled communities on the southwest fringe are largely Hausa, and to the southeast Kanuri. The large Kanuri town of N'guigmi is to the southeast and the Hausa cities of Goure and Zinder are to the southwest.

== Ecological protection ==
Termit is home to the Termit Massif Reserve, a 700,000 hectare faunal reserve established in 1962 to protect endangered antelope and Addax populations.

In 2006, the government of Niger applied to UNESCO to have the Termit Massif area named a UNESCO World Heritage Site.

== Gallery ==
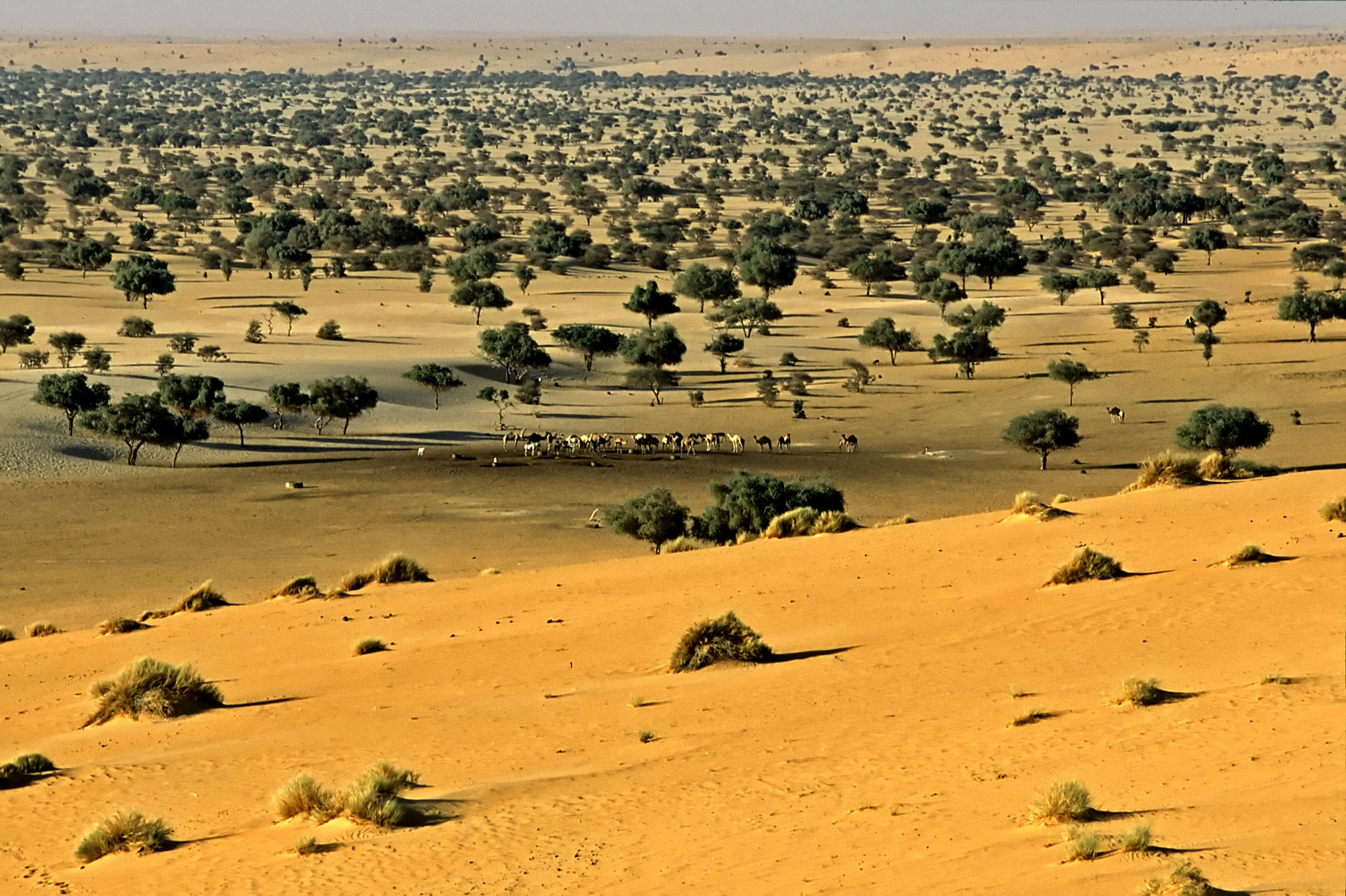
Camels drinking in one of the parts of the Termit massif in 2001

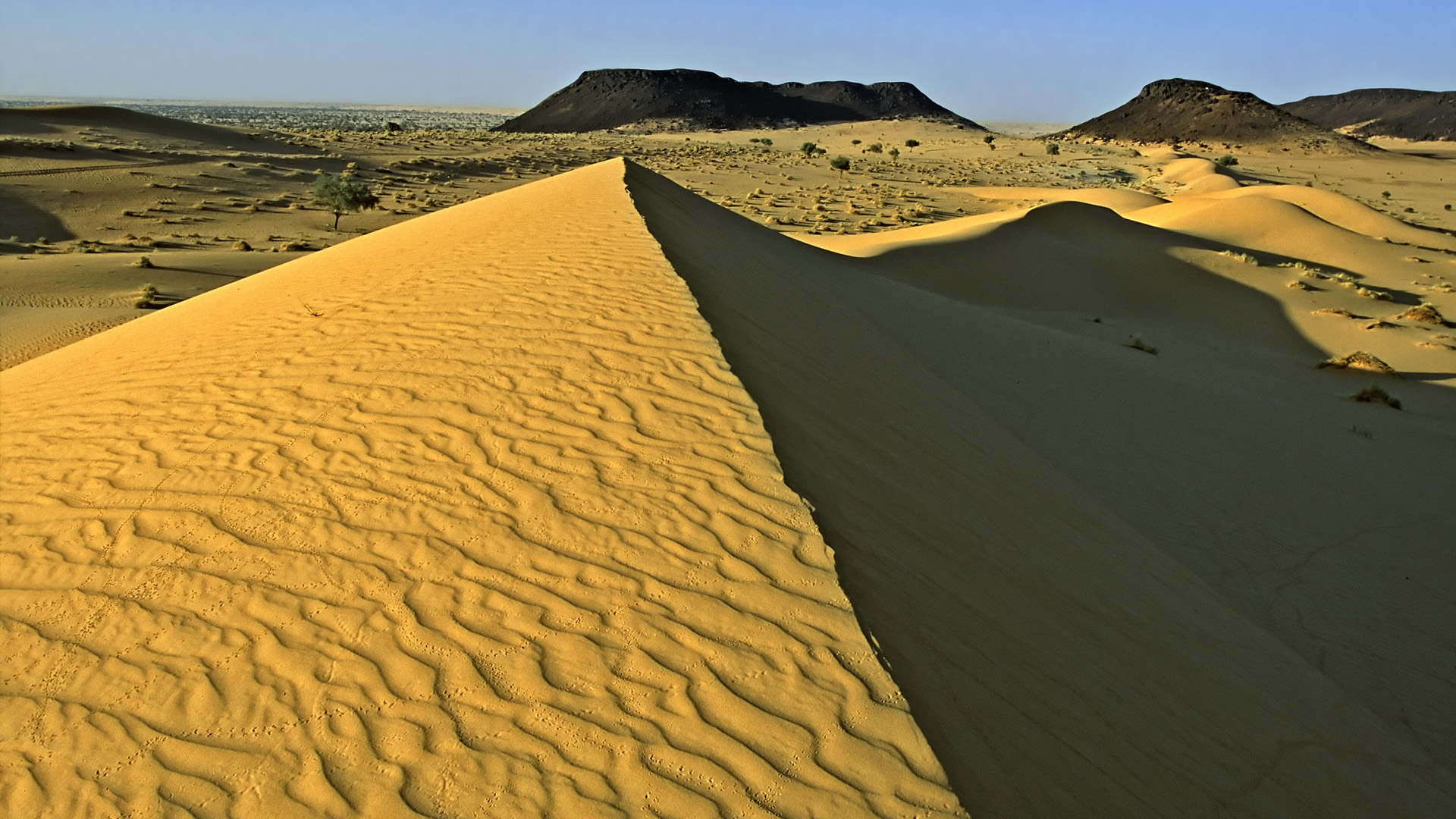
Sand dunes and rocky islands in the Termit massif, 2001

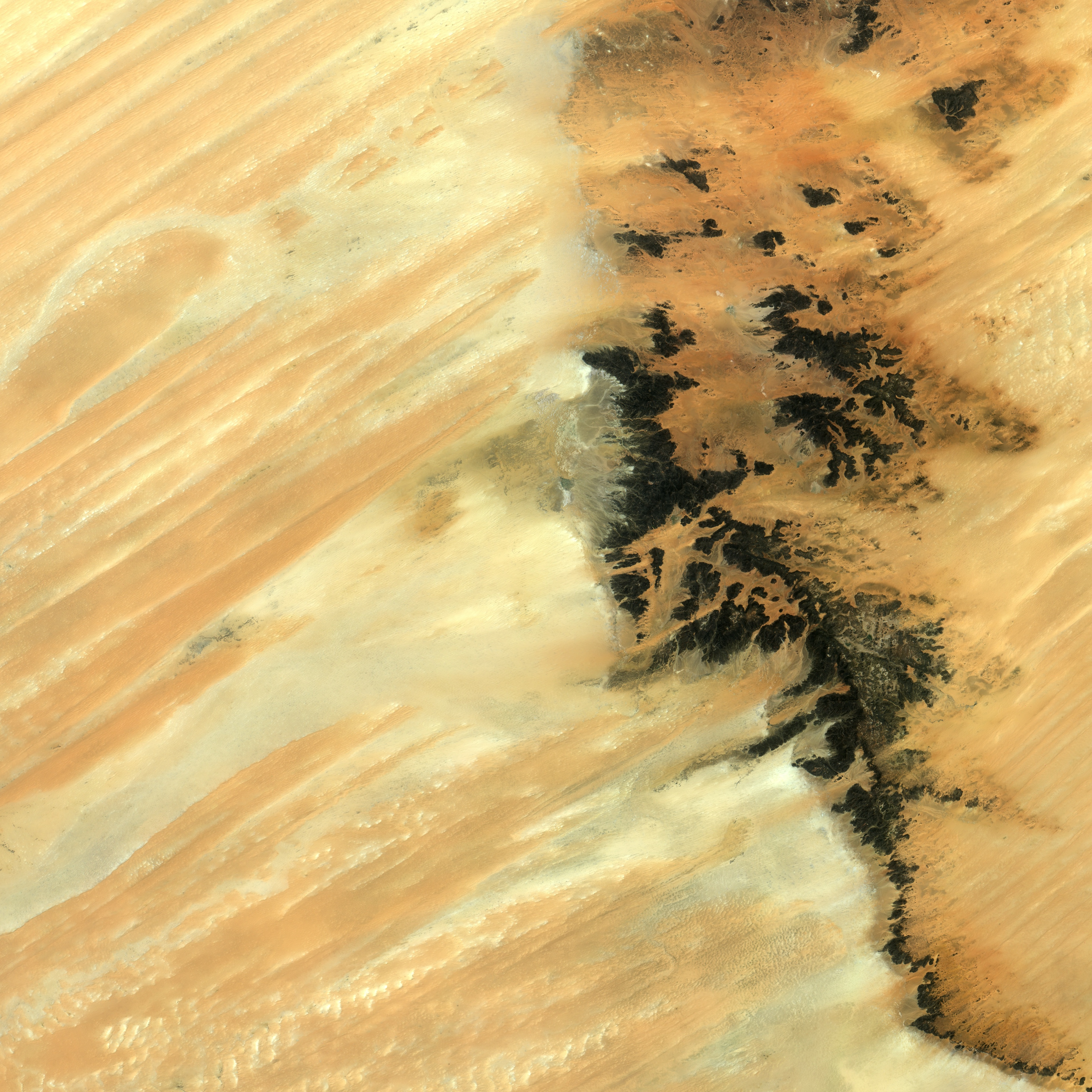
Satellite image of Termit massif visible from space

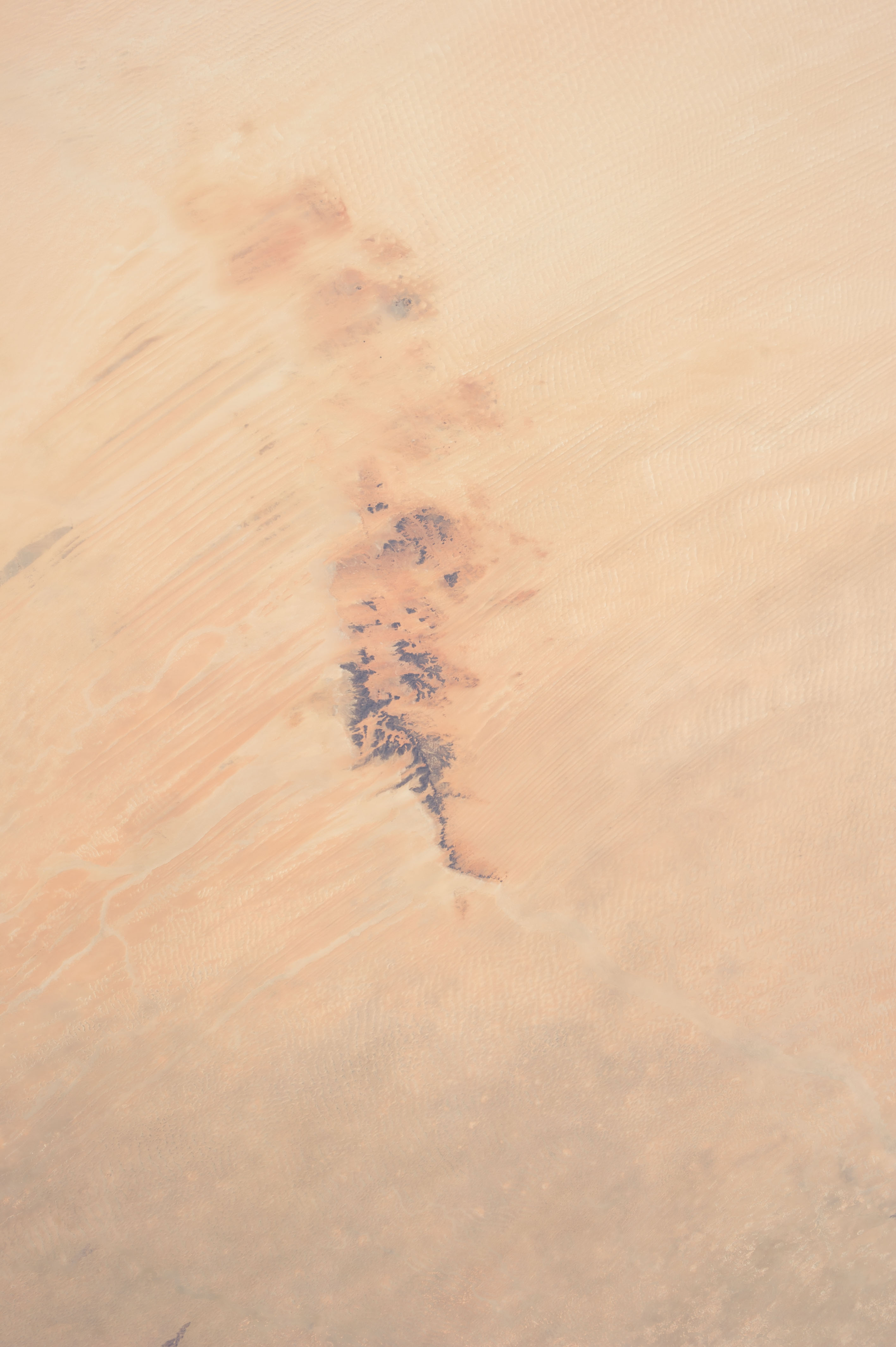
Termit massif from space
