= Alakoss =

Coordinates: 14°38′12″N 9°30′23″E

- Commune and village
- Interactive map of Alakoss
- Country: Niger
- Region: Zinder
- Department: Goure
- Elevation: 1,568 ft (478 m)

Population (2012)
  - Total: 19,199
- Time zone: UTC+1 (WAT)

Alakoss is a village and rural commune in Niger. In 2012, the village had a population of 19,199.
