= Goure =

Goure Gouré
- Commune
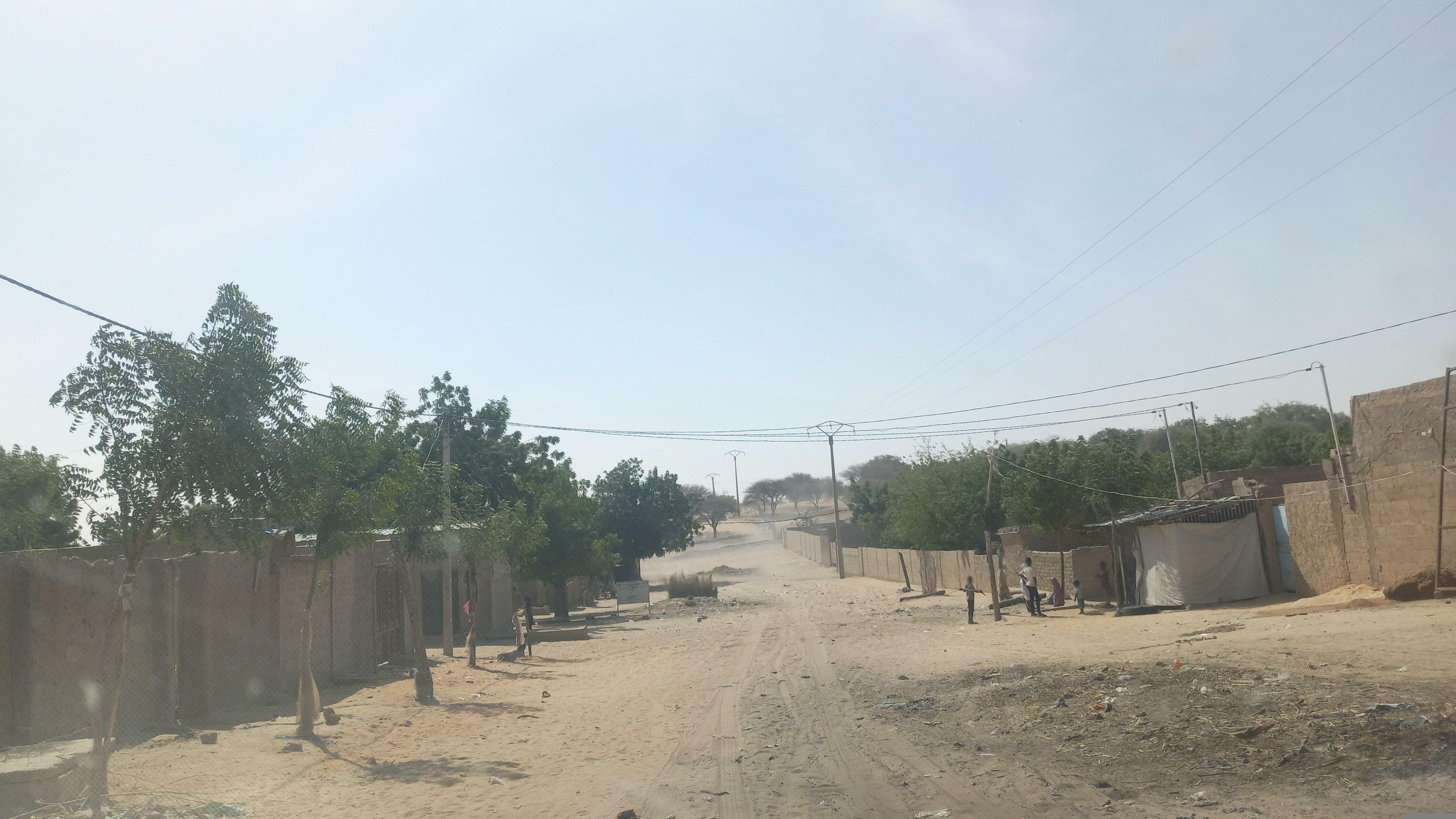
- Town Center

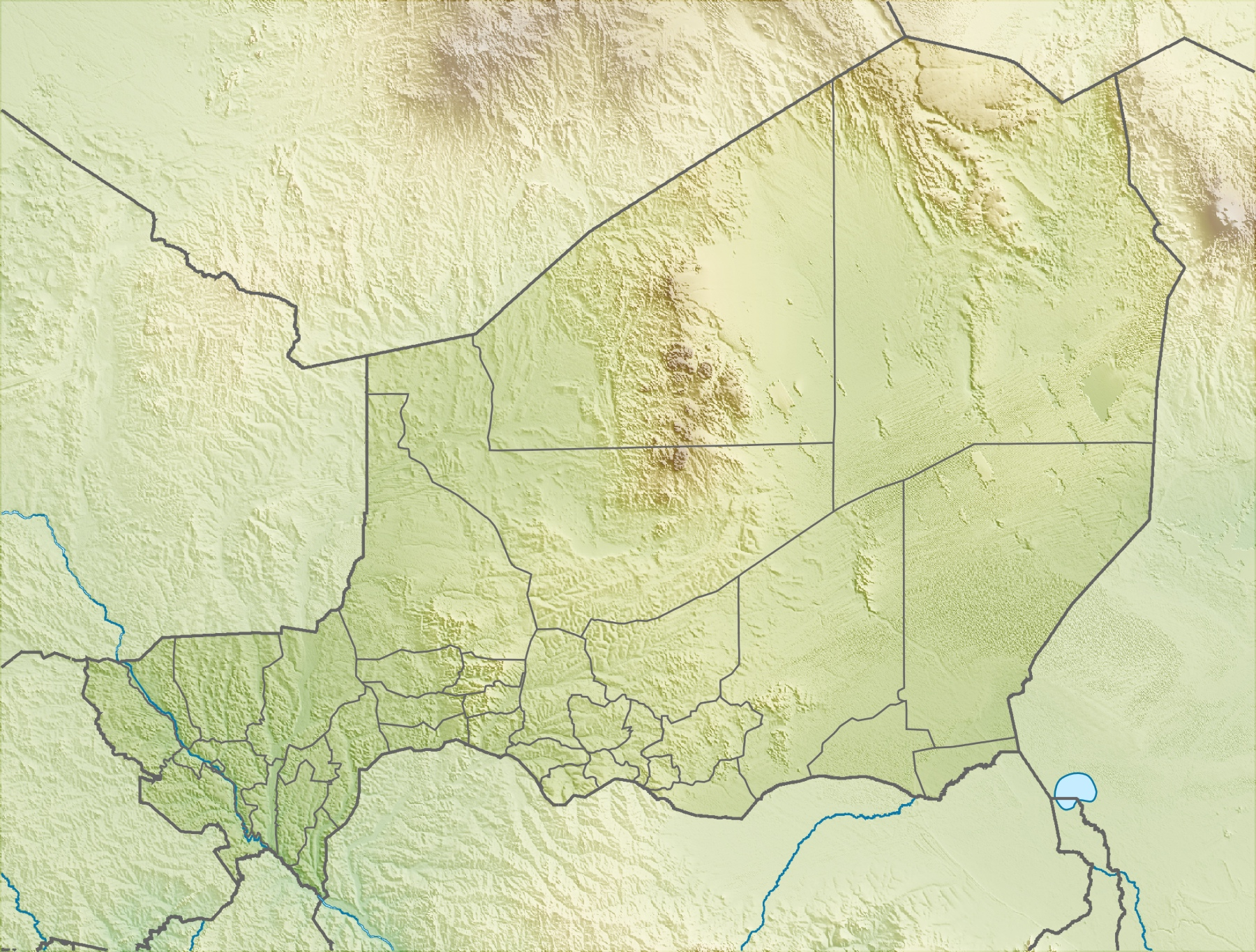
- Location within Niger
- Coordinates: 13°59′13″N 10°16′12″E
- Country: Niger
- Region: Zinder
- Department: Goure

Area
  - Commune: 4,193 km^{2} (1,619 sq mi)
  - Water: 0 km^{2} (0 sq mi)
- Elevation: 456 m (1,496 ft)

Population (2012 census)
  - Commune: 73,732
  - Urban: 18,289
- Time zone: UTC+01:00 (WAT)

Goure (fr. Gouré) is a Commune and town in southeastern Niger, Zinder Region, Goure Department, of which it is the seat. As of 2012, it had a population of 73,732.

== Situation ==
Situated on the main all-weather east–west highway in southern Niger, it is about 170 km east of the regional capital, Zinder, on the route east to Diffa, N'Guigmi, and the Lake Chad area along Niger's border with Chad. Around 40 km to the north of Goure are the Koutous hills, which form the first foothills of the Termit Massif. These hills also mark the northeastern boundary of Hausa settlement in Niger, with the desert and hills to the north sparsely populated by seasonal nomadic encampments, and the area to the east populated by a majority of settled Kanouri ethnic groups and Toubou pastoralists.

== Agriculture and environment ==
The surrounding land is mostly dry grass Sahel dotted with acacia trees, with green patches formed by kouris (seasonal watercourses with underground water) and cuvettes (natural depressions which retain seasonal rainwater). Farming is dominated by millet production.

The area around Goure is particularly threatened by desertification, and was in 2005 designated at the very northeastern edge of Nigerien farmland able to support its population. The area has thus become a centre for international anti-desertification efforts, where experiments by local and foreign organisations promote the use of windbreaks and scrub grids to fix soil and stop the influx of dunes.

The agricultural region around Goure has been devastated at several points since independence, with major droughts in the early 1970s, the mid-1980s, and the locust-induced crop loss famine in 1977 and 2005.

== Population ==
The town has grown since the 1960s, with its importance as a weigh station on Niger's primary east–west highway. In 1970, the town had a population of 2,124, 7,612 in 1977, 8,951 in 1985, and a population of 13,422 by 2001. Goure also has a landing strip, with ICAO Code DRZG.
