= Falenko =

Coordinates: 14°16′N 8°32′E

- Commune and village
- Interactive map of Falenko
- Country: Niger
- Region: Zinder
- Department: Tanout

Area
  - Total: 34.01 sq mi (88.08 km^{2})

Population (2012 census)
  - Total: 13,993
  - Density: 411.5/sq mi (158.9/km^{2})
- Time zone: UTC+1 (WAT)

Falenko is a village and rural commune in the Tanout Department of the Zinder Region of Niger. As of 2012, it had a population of 13,993.
