= Termit Massif Reserve =

Nature reserve in the southeast of Niger

Réserve totale de faune du Termit Massif
- IUCN category IV (habitat/species management area)
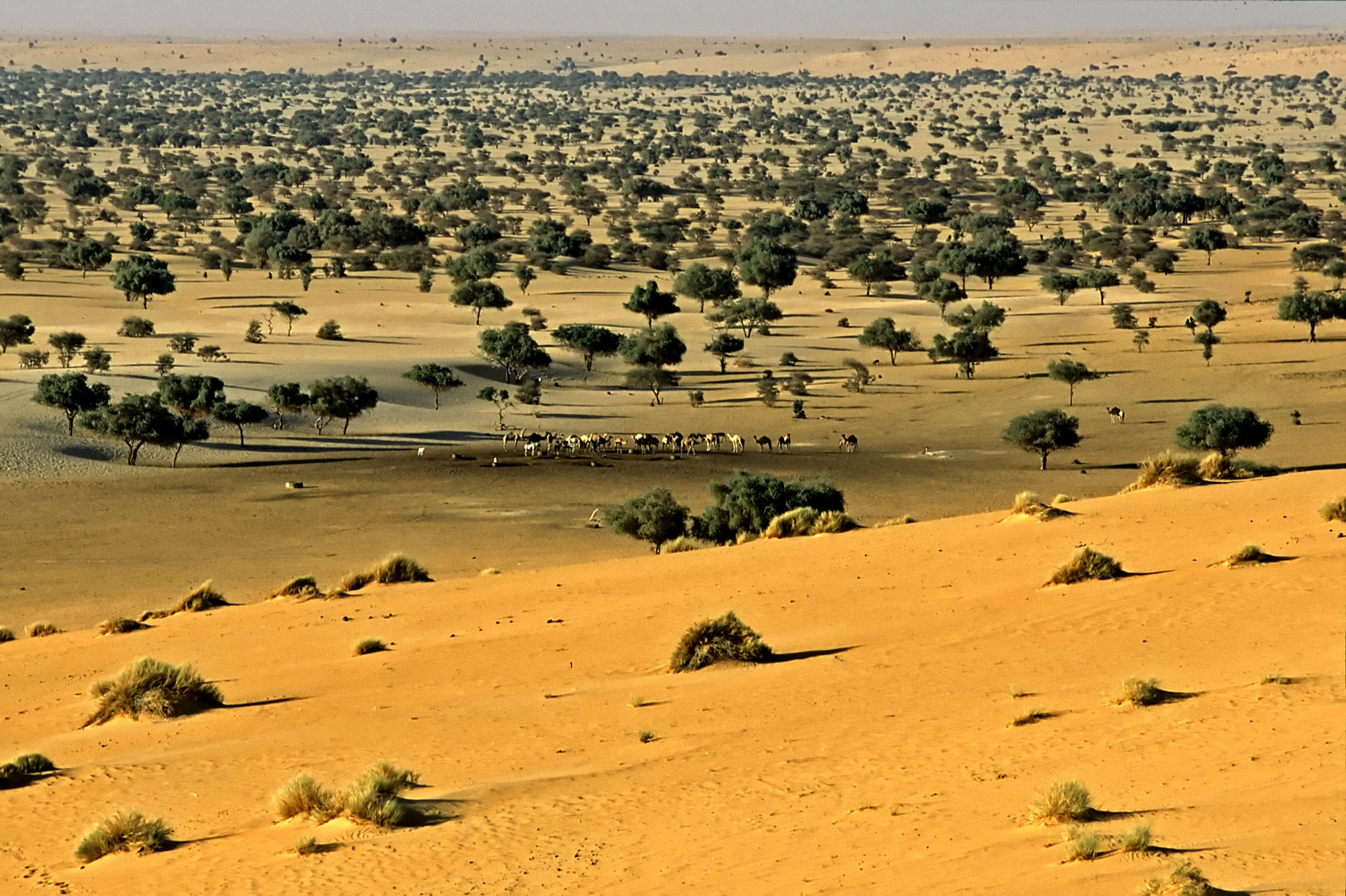

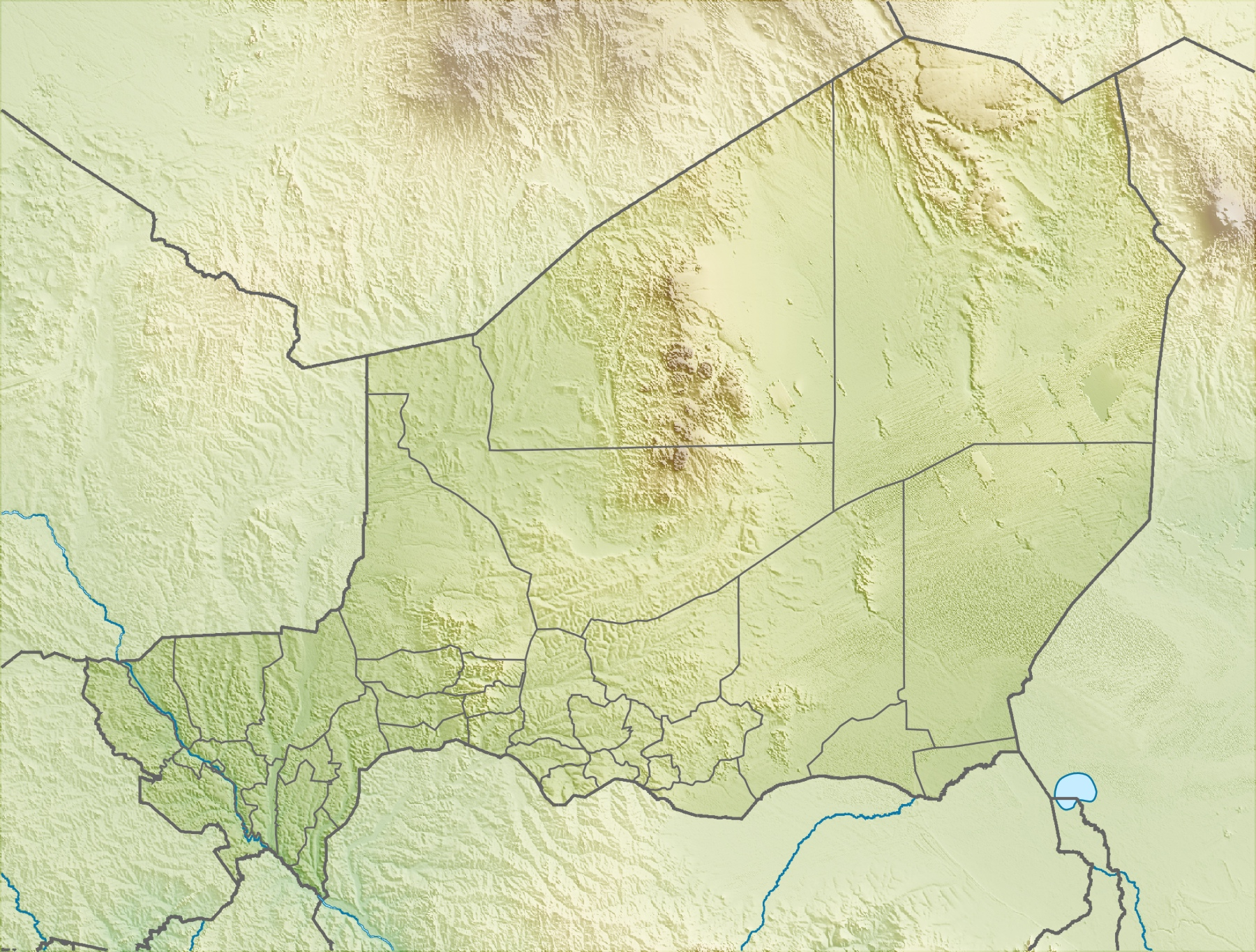
- Location within Niger
- Location: Zinder Region, Diffa Region, Niger
- Nearest city: Termit Kaoboul, Tasker
- Coordinates: 16°23′38″N 11°39′29″E
- Area: 86,215 km²
- Governing body: Parcs Nationaux & Reserves - Niger

The Termit Massif Total Reserve is a nature reserve in the southeast of Niger which was established in January 1962. In March 2012, a national nature and cultural reserve was established covering an area of 100,000 square kilometres (39,000 sq mi), including the entire area of the Termit Massif and Tin Toumma desert, making it the largest single protected area in Africa. The area provides habitat for many critically endangered species. Prominent among them is the addax antelope, which is categorized under the IUCN Red List as one of the rarest and most endangered species in the world; about 300 of them are reported in the reserve. A conservation effort has been launched by the Government of Niger in collaboration with many international conservation agencies. The reserve has also been declared a UNESCO World Heritage Site for the biodiversity value of the Termit Massif and surrounding Sahara Desert and for the cultural value of its archaeological sites.

The reserve has 30 species of mammals, several species of reptiles, and more than 150 species of birds; among the bird species recorded is the threatened lappet-faced vulture which breeds in small pockets in several areas of the reserve.

== History ==
The earliest reported exploration of the Termit Massif reserve area was by Saharan explorers Dixon Denham and Hugh Clapperton, Heinrich Barth, Gustav Nachtigal, Vischer and Buchanan who recorded the enormous amount of game found in the reserve. In recent years the decline in the wildlife of the region has also been noted, and some of the species have been photographed by renowned wildlife photographer Alain Dragesco-Joffé. This led to the initiation of action to preserve the wildlife in the area through suitable legislation passed by the Government of Niger on 1 January 1952, covering an area of 70,000 hectares (270 sq mi). This has been further enlarged recently to cover an area of 100,000 hectares (390 sq mi).

Awareness of the unique wildlife of the reserve has been facilitated by the Sahara Conservation Fund since 2001. The proposal to declare this reserve as a UNESCO World Heritage Site was submitted on 26 May 2006 under Criteria of Natural vii, on account of its biodiversity values and its cultural importance.

== Geography ==
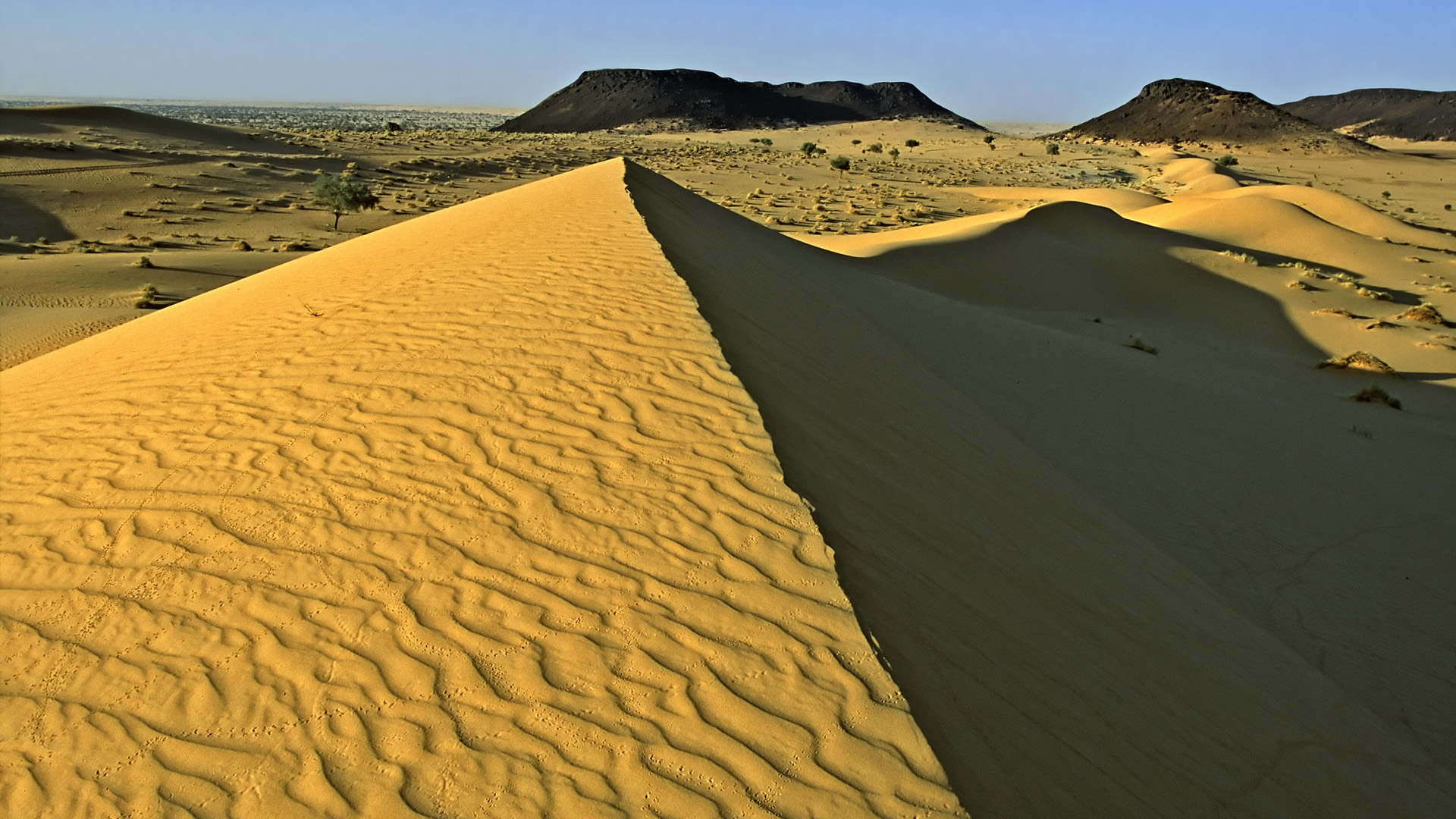
A view of the Termit Massif.

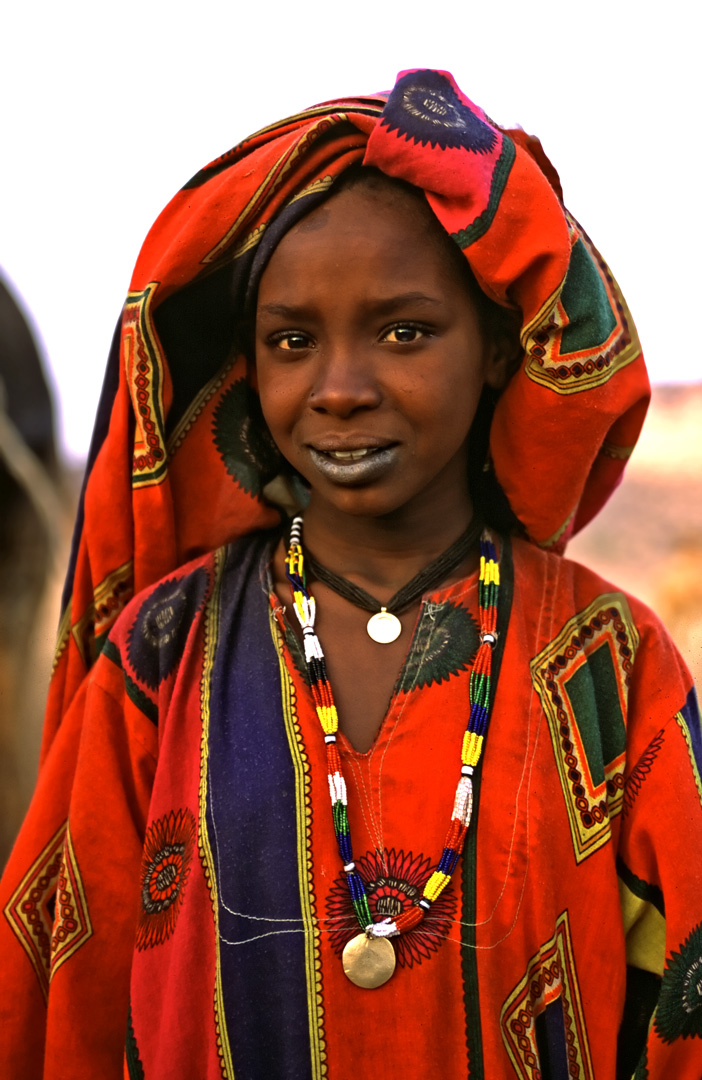
A tribal woman in the Termit Massif Reserve

The reserve is a Total Faunal Reserve IUCN type IV, established on 1 January 1962, covering over 700,000 hectares of the Termit Massif, which includes the Termit Massif Faunal Reserve Buffer Zone, forming a half ring around the southern border of the larger Termit Massif Reserve. The rocky Sahel highlands on the southern edge of the Sahara Desert are known for their endangered antelope populations. Termite has both desert and mountain terrain.

WWF has classified this reserve as part of the larger ecoregion of the South Saharan Steppe and Woodlands ecoregion that includes a strip of desert land that extends from central Mauritania, Mali, southwestern Algeria, Niger, Chad, and across Sudan to the Red Sea, and borders southern fringes of the Sahara Desert along the Saharan-Sahelian region, where the climate progressively becomes semi-arid. In the highly arid climatic conditions, annual average rainfall hovers around 100 mm, (highly temporal with spatial variation) which is generally during July and August. The ecoregion has two seasons - the dry season from November to May and the rainy season lasting from June to September. People's sustenance in the region is largely dependent on pastoralism, rainfed agriculture, irrigation near oases and cattle grazing.

Termit Massif is the central core of the reserve. The topography of the massif's southern part includes long eroded slopes of black sandstone formations which have valley formations, gullies, and hillocks of conical shape. The northern part called the Gossololom region, has rock outcrops rising out of the sand. The mastiff is surrounded by a landscape of black rocks and ochre-colored sand. The peak elevation of the massif is 710m. The massif is home to human settlements of tribes of Toubou people whose basic vocation is farming (livestock and agriculture) with rearing of camels, goats, and a limited number of sheep. The Gossololom region has notable archaeological finds from the Paleolithic and post-Neolithic periods. The tools found are Acheulean stone tools: microliths, biface tools, chopping tools, axe heads, and remnants of pots. Many carvings on stones of giraffes and cattle have also been found.

The soil formations recorded in the reserve in the sequence from south to north are; the ancient dunes of the Quaternary age consisting of soil and clay; dunes running longitudinally; the newly deposited layers of dunes; a mixture of old and new dunes in the north; formations of clayey sandstone as bedrock; and the sandy alluvium of the Quaternary age in the dry valley of Dillia.

In the dry valley of Dillia, and basins and valleys cutting the massif, there are only eight temporal ponds that are filled for 3 months of the year. In the foothills of the massif, deep wells of 16 to 40 m depth are the only other source of water.

== Wildlife ==
The reserve is a faunal reserve and hence all emphasis is on its fauna. Its flora consists mainly of Sahelian savanna of small, twisted trees, and trees with thorns and bushes.

=== Fauna ===
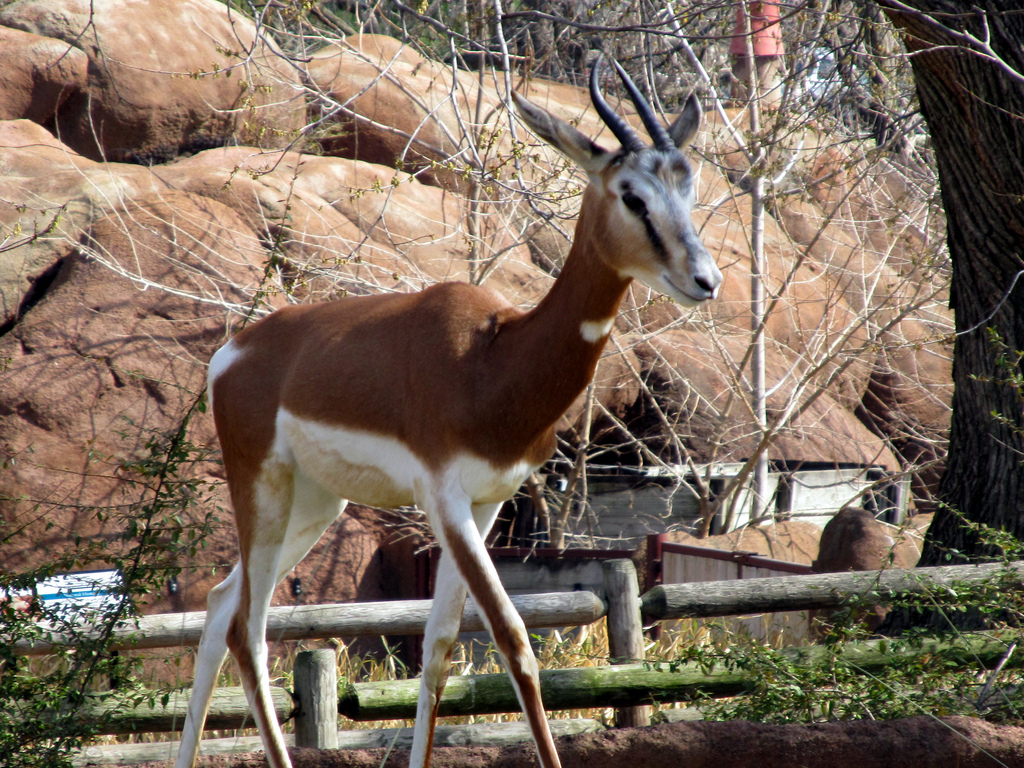
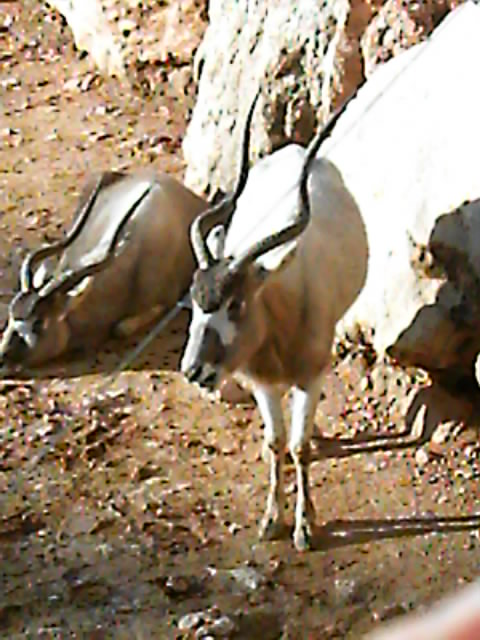
Left: dama gazelle, national animal of Niger. Right: highly endangered Addax nasomaculatus; the viable numbers in Termit Massif Reserve are the largest found in the world.

The reserve habitat is isolated, conditions which have helped create the rich congregation of desert fauna. Many IUCN Red Listed endangered species such as addax, dama and Dorcas gazelles, Saharan cheetah, Barbary sheep and striped hyena survive in large numbers. Bustards, of both the Nubian and Sudan species, and also tortoise (desert-adopted spur type) are also found in large numbers; vultures, small carnivorans, including canids (such as fennec, pale fox, Rüppell's fox and golden wolf) and small cat species (Saharan sand cat and African wild cat), are also reported in the reserve.

While details are difficult to establish, some researchers believe Termit may be home to the last self-sustaining population of the critically endangered addax, which at one time made regular migrations from what is now the Aïr and Ténéré Addax Sanctuary on the edge of the Ténéré desert. Several hundred dama gazelle are noted here. Though the slender-horned gazelle had previously been reported here, it was unknown by 1999 if it was still found in the area. The Saharan cheetah is reported to be very few, about 10. They have adapted to the searing heat of the Saharan Desert and can survive without a perennial source of water.

Air Barbary sheep are also found here.

=== Flora ===
Indigofera tinctoria

The reserve's vegetation consists of a steppe of Acacia-Panicum species on the western and southern sides of the massif. Grassy steppe species Panicum turgidum, Indigofera sessiliflora or Danthonia forskalii dominate the eastern part of the reserve. Other specific floral species recorded include: Vachellia tortilis and Panicum turgidum in the western and southern valleys, Acacia raddiana, Maerua crassifolia, Salvadora persica, Panicum turgidum, Chenbergiana and Leptadenia pyrotechnica.

== Conservation ==
The faunal reserve has been subject to intense hunting of endangered species.

The addax species remaining in the Termit region is considered the only place in the world with sustainable numbers. Hence, its conservation has received the active support of the Termit regional programme jointly funded by the Government of Niger, the Convention on Migratory Species (CMS), the Fonds Français pour l’Environnement Mondial (FFEM), the Association Française des Volontaires du Progrès (AFVP) and the Sahara Conservation Fund (SCF). This project is integral to The Sahelo-Saharan Antelopes (SSA) initiative undertaken by the "CMS Concerted Action for Sahelo-Saharan Antelopes" launched in 1998, which is called a "flagship project"
