= Tabelot =

- Commune and village
- Location in Niger
- Coordinates: 17°36′26″N 8°55′54″E
- Country: Niger
- Region: Agadez Region
- Department: Tchirozérine

Population (2011)
  - Total: 32,431
- Time zone: UTC+1 (WAT)

Tabelot is a village and rural commune in central Niger. As of 2011, the commune had a total population of 32,431 people.
