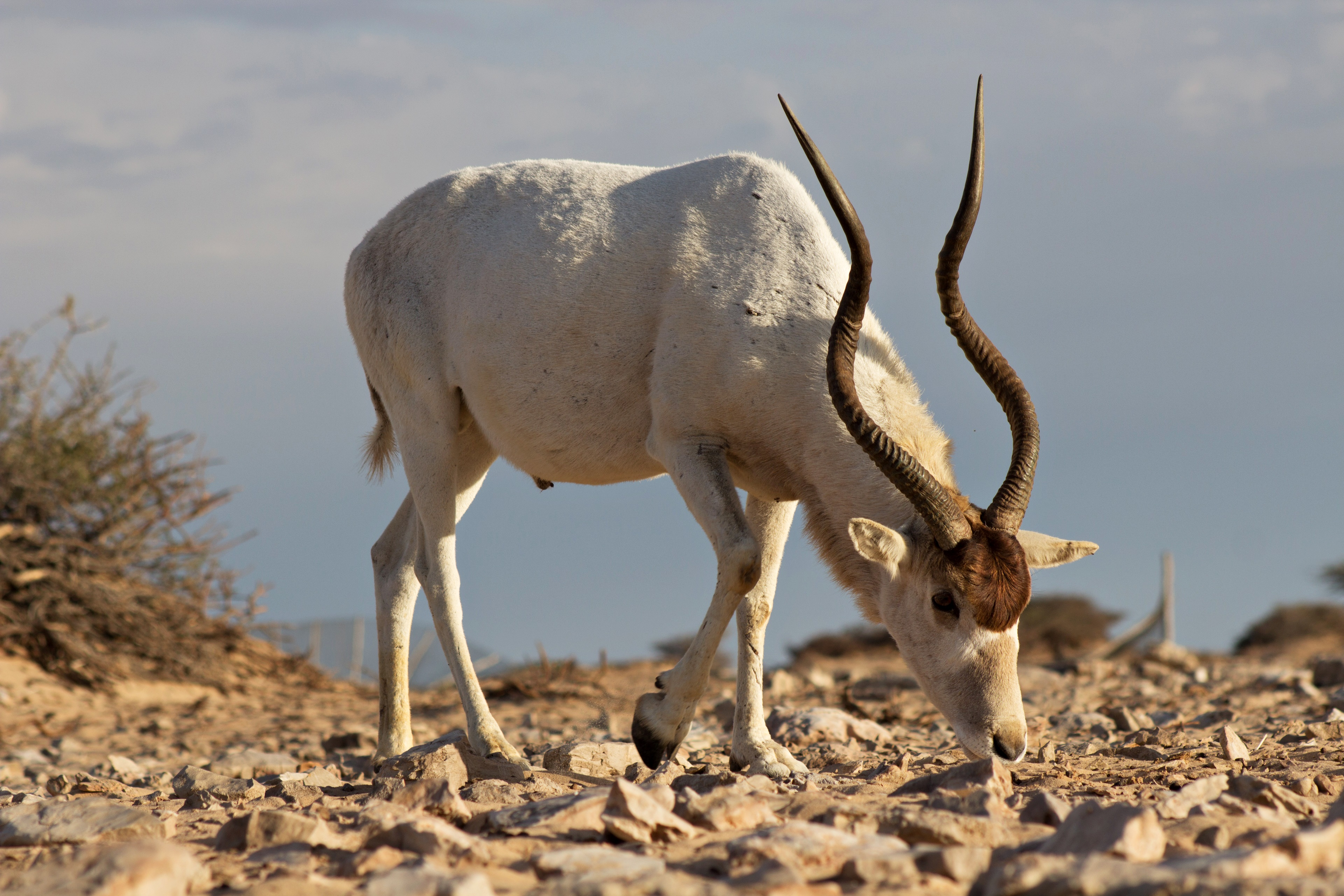
- An addax in Western Sahara

Conservation status
- Critically Endangered (IUCN 3.1)
- CITES Appendix I

Scientific classification
- Kingdom: Animalia
- Phylum: Chordata
- Class: Mammalia
- Order: Artiodactyla
- Family: Bovidae
- Subfamily: Hippotraginae
- Genus: Addax; Laurillard, 1841
- Species: A. nasomaculatus

Binomial name
- Addax nasomaculatus (Blainville, 1816)
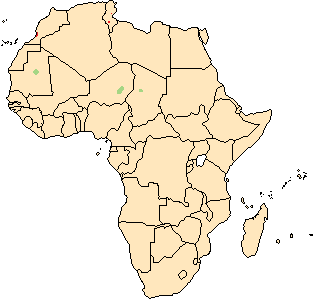
- Distribution of addax (IUCN 2015) Extant (resident) Reintroduced

Synonyms
- List: Addax addax Cretzschmar, 1826; Addax gibbosa Savi, 1828; Addax mytilopes Hamilton-Smith, 1827; Addax suturosa Otto, 1825; Cerophorus nasomaculata Blainville, 1816; Antilope addax Cretzschmar, 1826; Antilope suturosa Otto, 1825; Antilope mytilopes Hamilton-Smith, 1827; Oryx addax Hamilton-Smith, 1827; Oryx nasomaculatus J.E. Gray, 1843

= Addax =

Species of antelope native to the Sahara

The addax (Addax nasomaculatus), also known as the white antelope and the screwhorn antelope, is an antelope native to the Sahara. The only member of the genus Addax, it was first described scientifically by Henri de Blainville in 1816. As suggested by its alternative name, the addax has spiral horns that are 55 to 80 cm (22 to 31 in) long in females and 70 to 85 cm (28 to 33 in) in males. In the winter, its coat is greyish-brown with white hindquarters and legs, and long, brown hair on the head, neck, and shoulders; in the summer, the coat turns almost completely white or sandy blonde. Males stand from 105 to 115 cm (41 to 45 in) at the shoulder, with females at 95 to 110 cm (37 to 43 in). They are sexually dimorphic, as the females are generally smaller than the males.

The addax lives in arid regions, semideserts, and sandy and stony deserts in North Africa. It mainly eats grasses and leaves of shrubs, leguminous herbs, and bushes. It can live without water for long periods of time. Addax form herds of five to 20 members, consisting of both males and females. The herd is usually led by one dominant male. Breeding season is at its peak during winter and early spring.

The addax is listed as critically endangered on the IUCN Red List. It was once abundant, but is currently restricted to Chad, Mauritania, and Niger. It is threatened by unregulated hunting and is locally extinct in Western Sahara, Algeria, Libya, Egypt, and Sudan.

== Taxonomy and naming ==
The scientific name of the addax Addax nasomaculatus was proposed by Henri Marie Ducrotay de Blainville in 1816; he described a specimen in William Bullock's Pantherion and the Museum of the Royal College of Surgeons. Its type locality is probably in the Tunisian part of the Sahara.

The generic name Addax is thought to be obtained from an Arabic word meaning a wild animal with crooked horns. It is also thought to have originated from a Latin word. The name was first used in 1693. The specific name nasomaculatus comes from the Latin words nasus (in its combining form naso-) meaning ‘nose,’ and maculatus meaning ‘spotted,’ referring to the spots and facial markings of the species. Bedouins use another name for the addax, the Arabic bakr (or bagr) al wahsh, which literally means "the cow of the wild". That name can be used to refer to other ungulates, as well. The other common names of addax are "white antelope" and "screwhorn antelope".

== Genetics ==
The addax has 29 pairs of chromosomes. All chromosomes are acrocentric except for the first pair of autosomes, which are submetacentric. The X chromosome is the largest of the acrocentric chromosomes, and the Y chromosome is medium-sized. The short and long arms of the pair of submetacentric autosomes correspond respectively to the 27th and 1st chromosomes in cattle and goats. In a study, the banding patterns of chromosomes in addax were found to be similar to those in four other species of the subfamily Hippotraginae.

== History and fossil record ==
In ancient times, the addax occurred from northern Africa through Arabia and the Levant. Pictures in a tomb, dating back to 2500 BCE, show at least the partial domestication of the addax by the ancient Egyptians. These pictures show addax and some other antelopes tied with ropes to stakes. The number of addax captured by a person were considered an indicator of his high social and economic position in the society. The pygarg ("white-buttocked") beast mentioned in Deuteronomy 14:5 is believed by Henry Baker Tristram to have been an addax, but poaching has resulted in the extinction of this species in Egypt since the 1960s.

Addax fossils have been found in four sites of Egypt – a 7000 BCE fossil from the Great Sand Sea, a 5000–6000 BCE fossil from Djara, a 4000–7000 BCE fossil from Abu Ballas Stufenmland, and a 5000 BCE fossil from Gilf Kebir. Apart from these, fossils have also been excavated from Mittleres Wadi Howar (6300 BCE fossil), and Pleistocene fossils from Grotte Neandertaliens, Jebel Irhoud, and Parc d'Hydra.

== Description ==
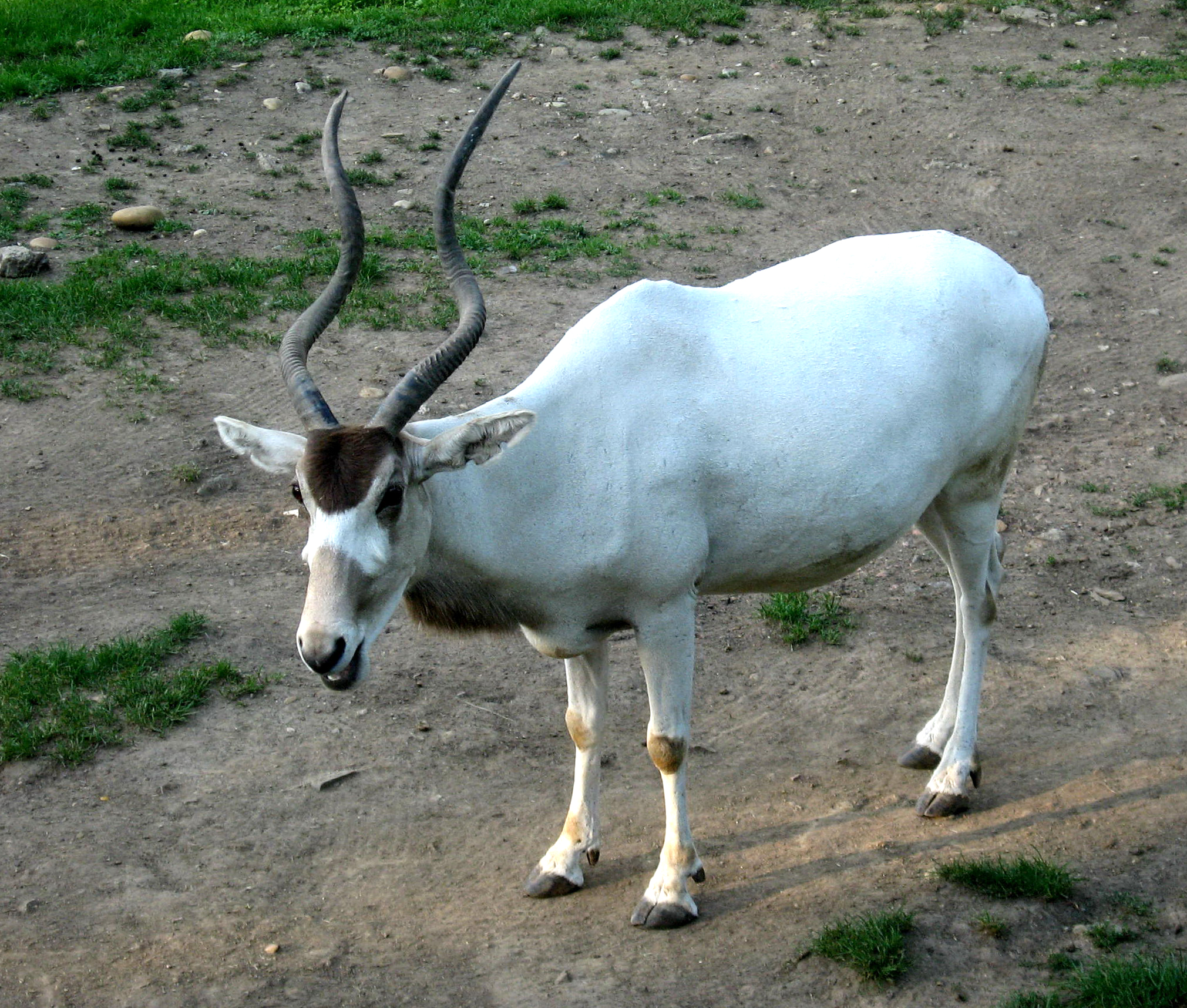
The coat colour in summer

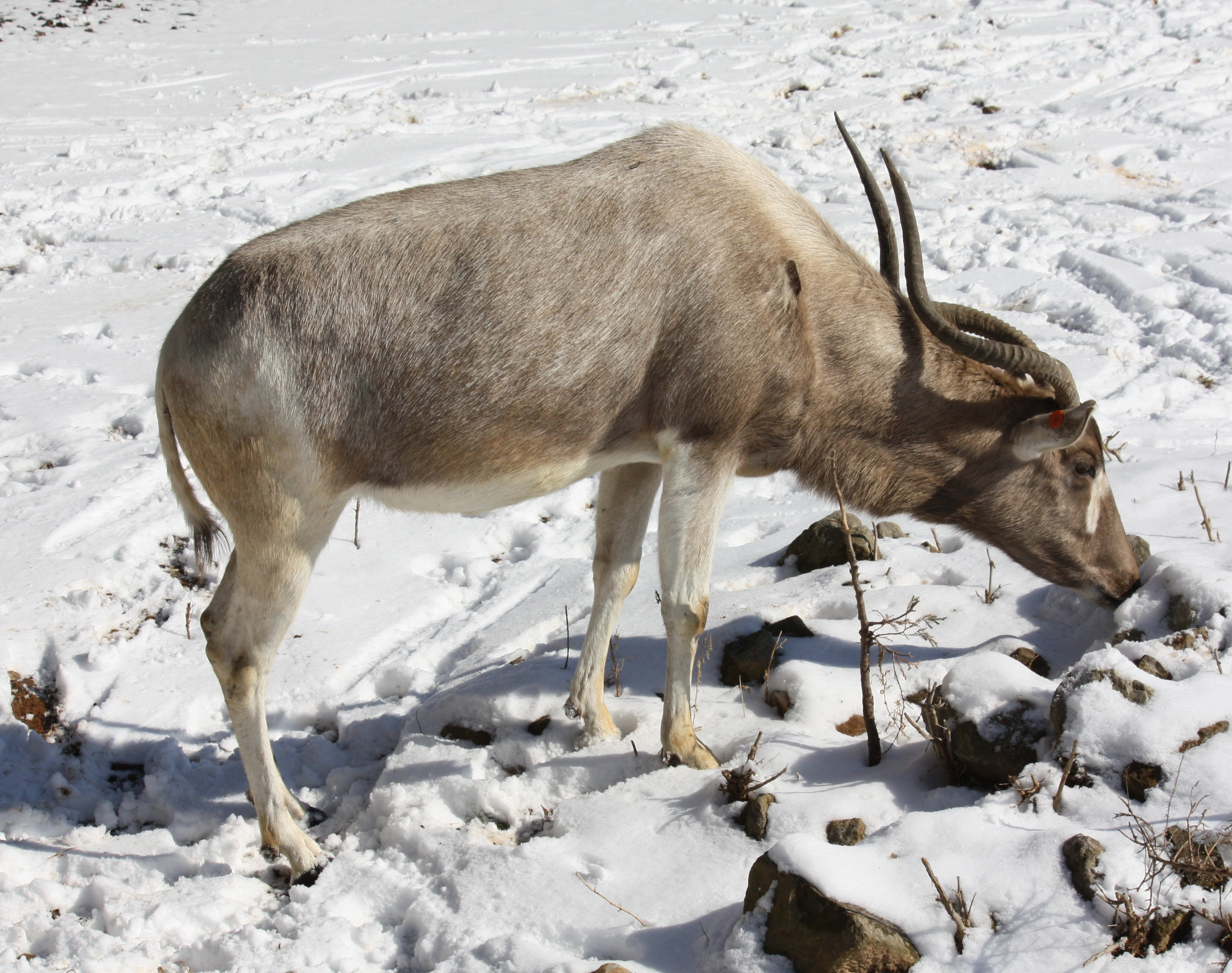
The coat colour in winter

The addax is greyish-brown in winter and almost completely white or sandy blonde in summer; it has white hindquarters and legs, and long, brown hair on the head, neck, and shoulders. Its head-to-body length is 120 to 130 cm (47 to 51 in), and its tail is 25 to 35 cm (9.8 to 13.8 in) long. It is sexually dimorphic in size, as males stand from 105 to 115 cm (41 to 45 in) at the shoulder with a weight of 100 to 125 kg (220 to 276 lb), whereas females are 95 to 110 cm (37 to 43 in) tall with a weight of 60 to 90 kg (130 to 200 lb). Their heads are marked with brown or black patches that form an X over their noses. They have scraggly beards and prominent red nostrils. Long, black hairs stick out between their curved and spiraling horns, ending in a short mane on the neck.

The horns have two to three twists and are typically 55 to 80 cm (22 to 31 in) in females and 70 to 85 cm (28 to 33 in) in males, although the maximum recorded length is 109.2 cm (43.0 in). The lower and middle portions of the horns are marked with a series of 30 to 35 ring-shaped ridges. The tail is short and slender, ending in a puff of black hair. The hooves are broad with flat soles and strong dewclaws to help them walk on soft sand. All four feet possess scent glands. The lifespan of the addax is up to 19 years in the wild, which can be extended to 25 years in captivity.

The addax closely resembles the scimitar oryx, but can be distinguished by its horns and facial markings. While the addax is spiral-horned, the scimitar oryx has decurved, 127 cm (50 in) long horns. The addax has a brown hair tuft extending from the base of its horns to between its eyes. A white patch, continuing from the brown hair, extends until the middle of the cheek. The scimitar oryx, though, has a white forehead with only a notable brown marking, a brown lateral stripe across its eyes. It differs from other antelopes by having large, square teeth like cattle and lacking the typical facial glands.

== Distribution and habitat ==
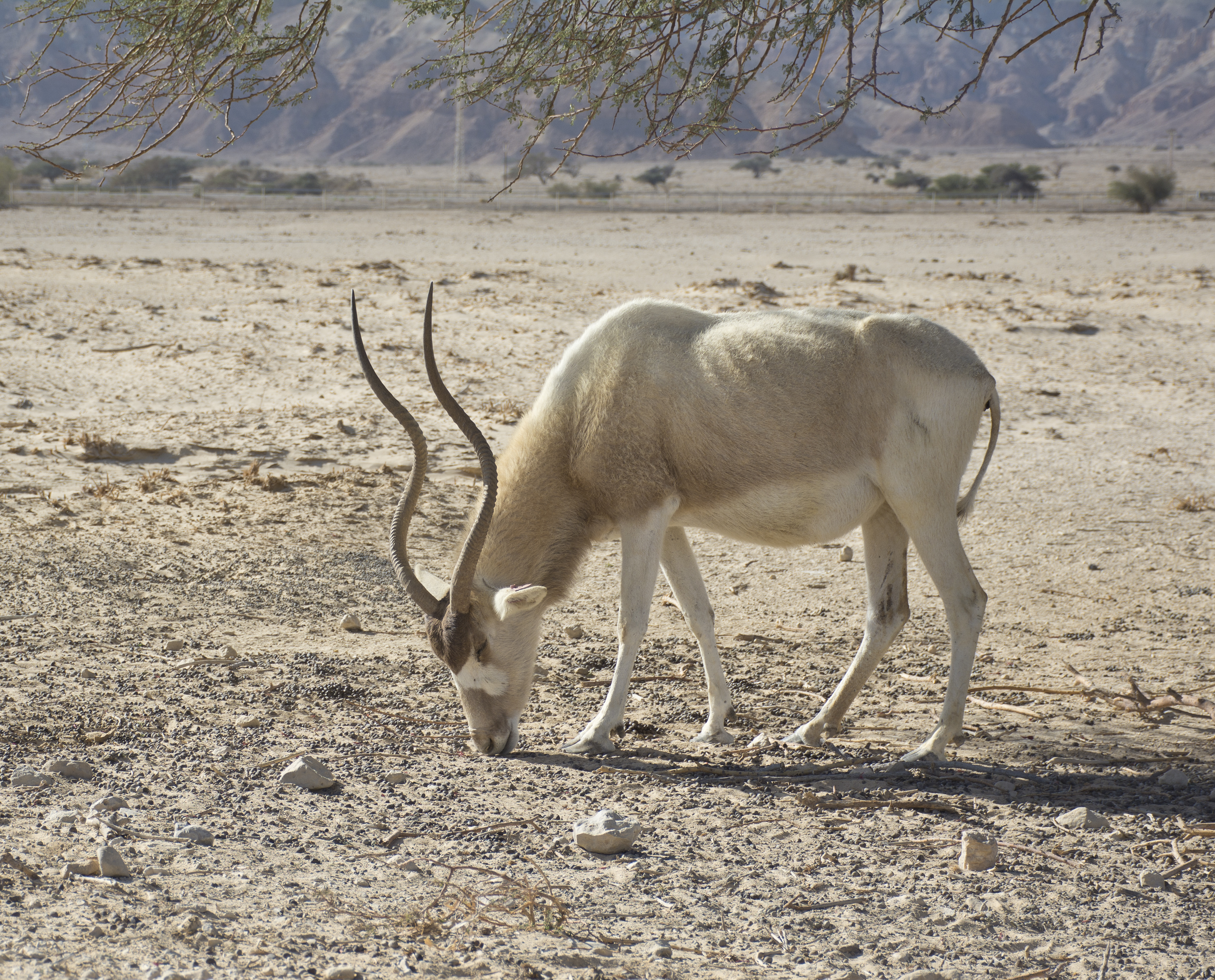
Addax in Yotvata Hai-Bar Nature Reserve

The addax inhabits arid regions, semideserts, and sandy and stony deserts. It can live in extremely arid areas, with less than 100 mm (3.9 in) annual rainfall. It also inhabits deserts with tussock grasses (Stipagrostis species) and succulent thorn scrub Cornulaca. Formerly, the addax was widespread in the Sahelo-Saharan region of Africa, west of the Nile Valley, and all countries sharing the Sahara, but today the only known self-sustaining population is present in the Termit Massif Reserve in Niger. Reports of sightings have been made from the eastern Air Mountains in Niger and Bodélé in Chad. Rare nomads may be seen in northern Niger, southern Algeria, and Libya; it is rumoured to be present along the Mali/Mauritania border, though no sightings have been confirmed. The addax was once abundant in North Africa, native to Chad, Mauritania, and Niger. It is extinct in Algeria, Egypt, Libya, Sudan, and the Western Sahara. It has been reintroduced into Morocco and Tunisia.

== Behavior and ecology ==
Addax herds contain both males and females, and have from five to 20 members. They generally stay in one place and only wander widely in search of food. The herd is usually formed around one dominant male. In captivity, males show signs of territoriality and mate guarding, while captive females establish dominance hierarchies, with the oldest females holding highest rank. Herds are more likely to be found along the northern edge of the tropical rain system during the summer and move north as winter falls. They are able to track rainfall and head for these areas where vegetation is more plentiful. Males are territorial and guard females, while the females establish their own dominance hierarchies.

Due to its slow movements, the addax is an easy target for predators, such as humans, lions, leopards, cheetahs, and African wild dogs. Caracals, servals, and hyenas attack calves. The addax is normally not aggressive, though individuals may charge if they are disturbed.

=== Adaptations ===
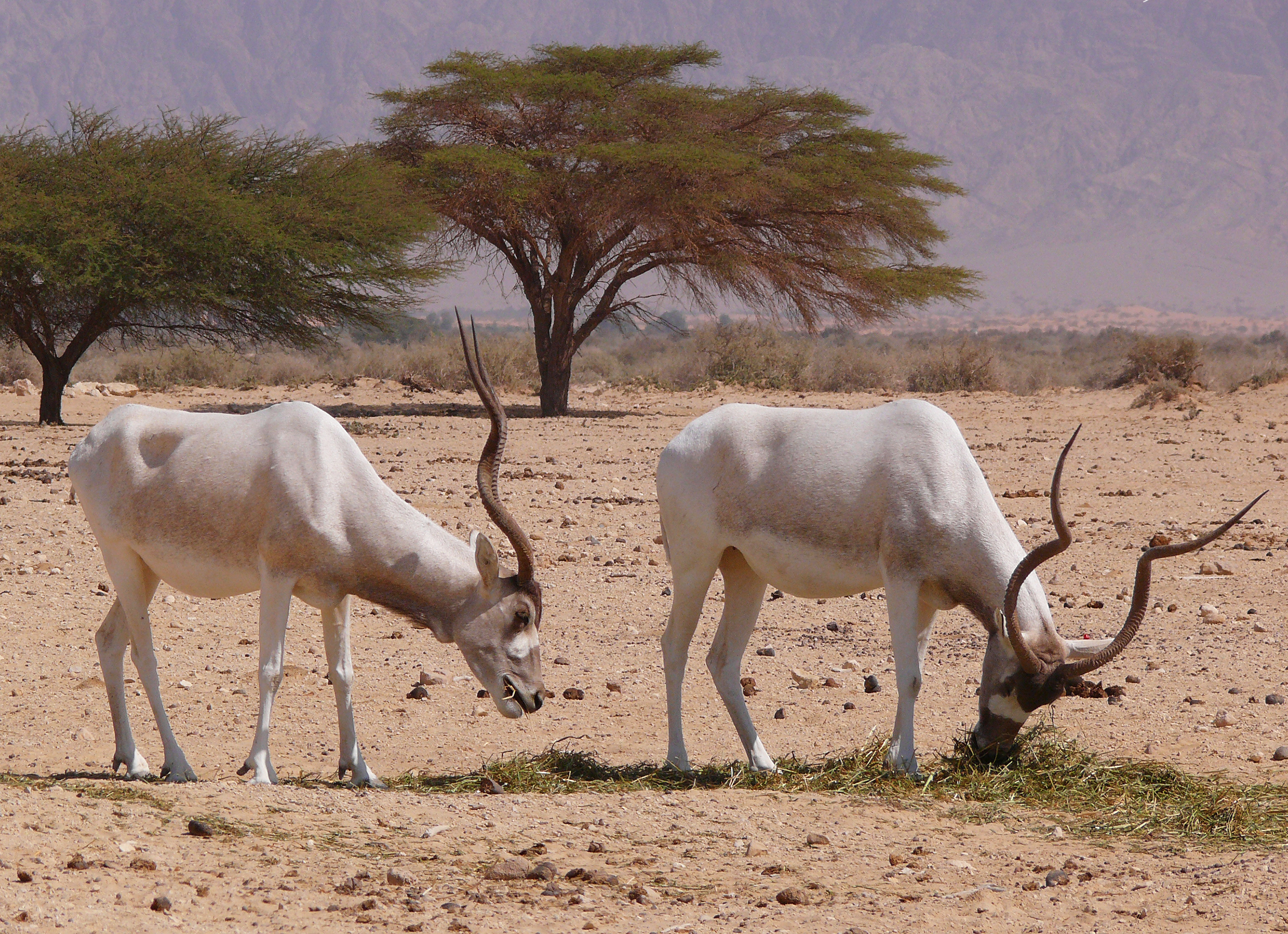
Addax grazing in dry conditions

The addax is amply suited to live in the deep desert under extreme conditions. It can survive without free water almost indefinitely, because it gets moisture from its food and dew that condenses on plants. The addax has a special lining in its stomach that stores water in pouches to use in times of dehydration. It also produces highly concentrated urine to conserve water. The pale colour of the coat reflects radiant heat, and the length and density of the coat helps in thermoregulation. In the day, the addax huddles together in shaded areas, and on cool nights, rests in sand hollows. These practices help in dissipation of body heat and saving water by cooling the body through evaporation.

In a study, eight addax on a diet of grass hay (Chloris gayana) were studied to determine the retention time of food from the digestive tract. Food retention time was long, possibly as an adaptation to a diet including a high proportion of slow-fermenting grasses; the long retention time also could be interpreted to be due to water-saving mechanisms with low water turnover and a roomy rumen.

=== Diet ===
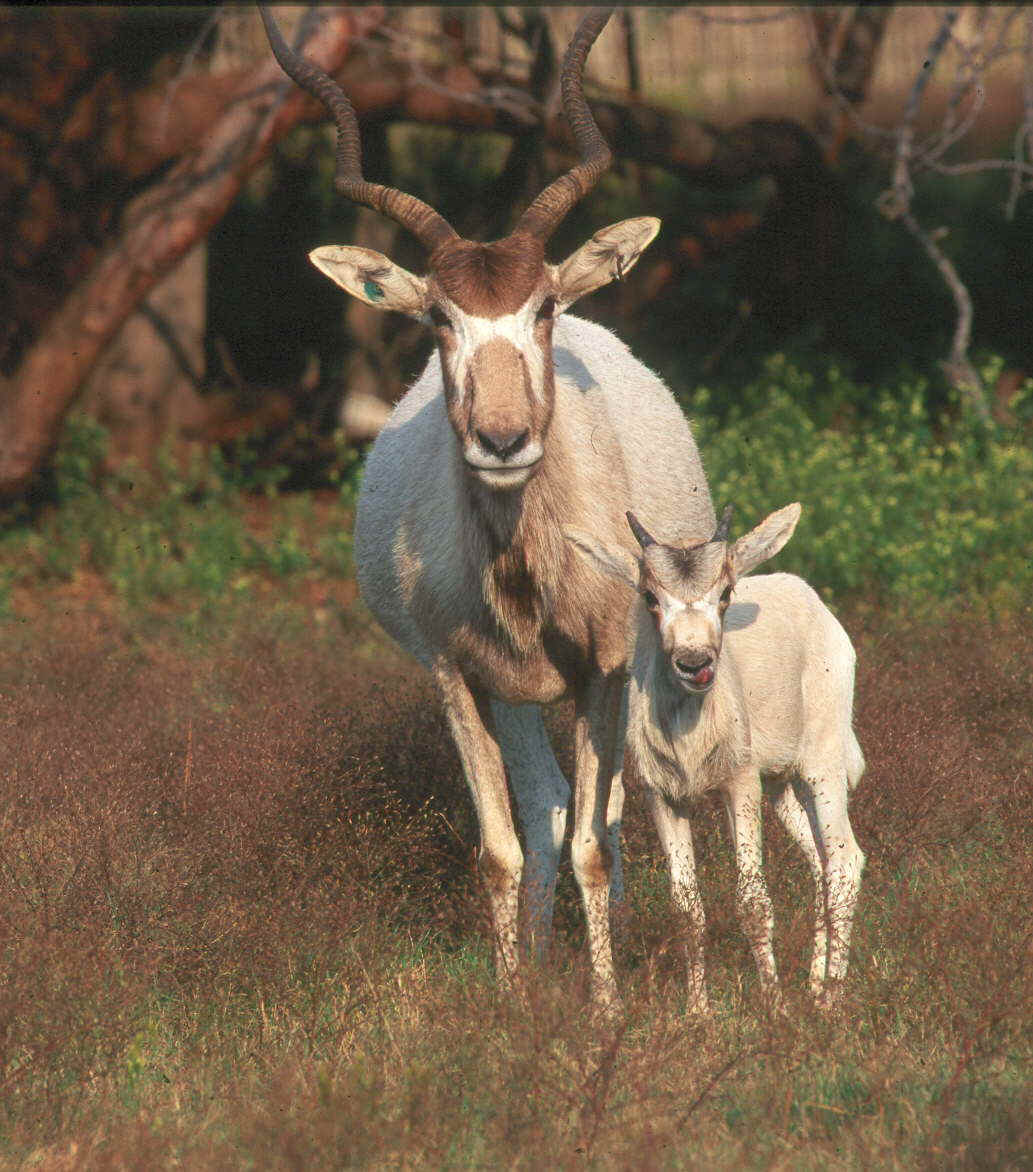
An addax calf with its mother

The addax lives in desert terrain where it eats grasses and leaves of what shrubs, leguminous herbs, and bushes are available. Primarily a grazer, its staple foods include Aristida, Panicum, and Stipagrostis, and it only consumes browse, such as leaves of Acacia trees, in the absence of these grasses. It also eats perennials, which turn green and sprout at the slightest bit of humidity or rain. The addax eats only certain parts of the plant and tends to crop the Aristida grasses neatly to the same height. By contrast, when feeding on Panicum grasses, the drier outer leaves are left alone while it eats the tender inner shoots and seeds. These seeds are important part of the addax's diet, being its main source of protein.

=== Reproduction ===
Females are sexually mature at 2–3 years of age and males around 2 years. Breeding occurs throughout the year, but it peaks during winter and early spring. In the northern Sahara, breeding peaks at the end of winter and the beginning of spring; in the southern Sahara, breeding peaks from September to October and from January to mid-April. Each estrus bout lasts for 1–2 days.

In a study, the blood serum of female addax was analyzed through immunoassay to know about their luteal phase. Estrous cycle duration was of about 33 days. During pregnancy, ultrasonography showed the uterine horns as coiled. The maximum diameters of the ovarian follicle and the corpus luteum were 15 mm (0.59 in) and 27 mm (1.1 in), respectively. Each female underwent an anovulatory period lasting 39 to 131 days, during which no ovulation occurred. Anovulation was rare in winter, which suggested the effect of seasons on the estrous cycle.

Gestation period lasts 257–270 days (about nine months). Females may lie or stand during the delivery, during which one calf is born. A postpartum estrus occurs after 2-3 days. The calf weighs 5 kg (11 lb) at birth and is weaned at 23–29 weeks old.

=== Health ===
The addax is most prone to parasites in moist climatic conditions. Addax have always been infected with nematodes in the Trichostrongyloidea and Strongyloidea superfamilies. In an exotic ranch in Texas, an addax was found host to the nematodes Haemonchus contortus and Longistrongylus curvispiculum in its abomasum, of which the former was dominant.

== Threats and conservation ==
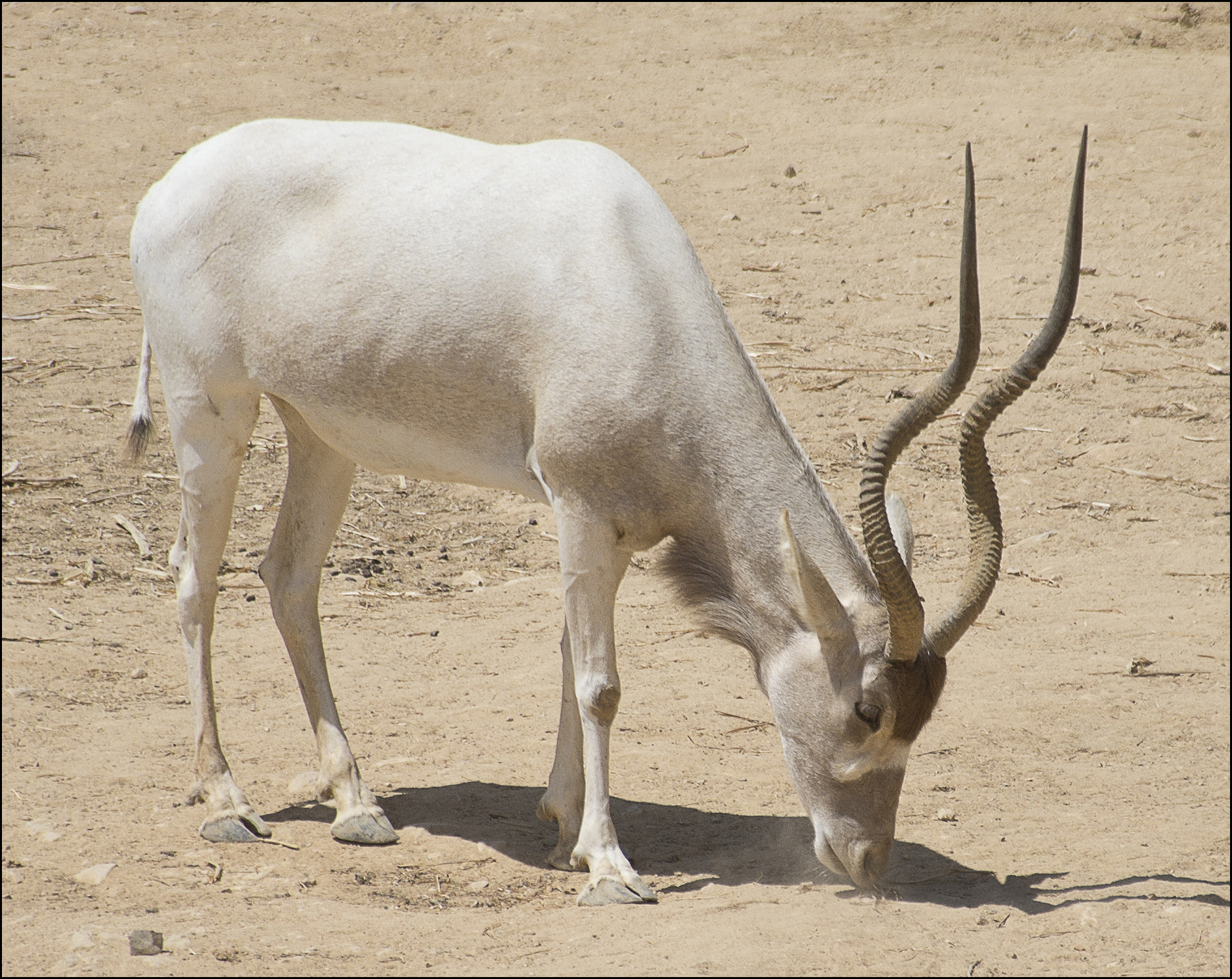
An addax in a breeding program at the Jerusalem Biblical Zoo, Israel

Declines in the population of the addax have been ongoing since the mid-1800s. More recently, addax were found from Algeria to Sudan, but due mainly to overhunting, they have become much more restricted and rare.

Addax are easy to hunt due to their slow movements. Roadkill, firearms for easy hunting, and nomadic settlements near waterholes (their dry-season feeding places) have also decreased their numbers. Moreover, their meat and leather are highly prized. Other threats include chronic droughts in the deserts, habitat destruction due to more human settlements, and agriculture. Fewer than 500 individuals are thought to exist in the wild today, most of the animals being found between the Termit area of Niger, the Bodélé region of western Chad, and the Aoukar in Mauritania.

Today, over 600 addax are kept in captivity in Europe, Israel, Libya, Egypt, North America, Japan, Australia and Uruguay under captive-breeding programmes. Thousands more are in private collections and ranches in the United States and the Middle East. Addax are legally protected in Morocco, Tunisia, and Algeria; hunting of all gazelles is forbidden in Libya and Egypt. Although enormous reserves, such as the Hoggar Mountains and Tasilli in Algeria, the Ténéré in Niger, the Ouadi Rimé-Ouadi Achim Faunal Reserve in Chad, and the newly established Wadi Howar National Park in Sudan, cover areas where the addax previously occurred, some do not keep addax now because they lack the resources. The addax has been reintroduced into Bou-Hedma National Park (Tunisia) and Souss-Massa National Park (Morocco). Reintroductions in the wild are ongoing in Jebil National Park (Tunisia) and Grand Erg Oriental (the Sahara), and another is planned for Morocco.

In 2019, Sahara Conservation Fund in partnership with the Environment Agency Abu Dhabi began a project to reintroduce addax to the Ouadi Rimé-Ouadi Achim Faunal Reserve, and a small population now exists there. In 2023, 10 addax were moved to Ennedi Natural and Cultural Reserve.
