= Tanout Department =

Coordinates: 14°45′N 8°20′E

Tanout
- Department
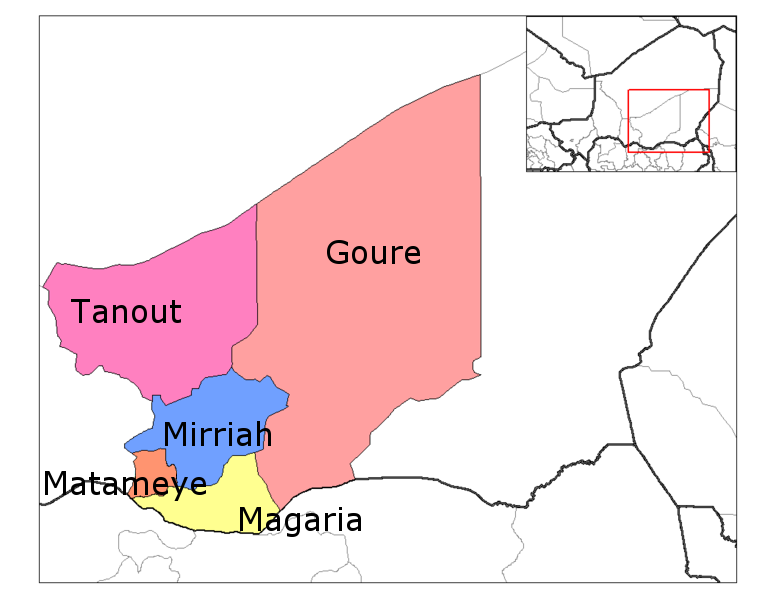
- Tanout Department location in the region
- Country: Niger
- Region: Zinder Region

Area
  - Total: 4,222 sq mi (10,935 km^{2})

Population (2012)
  - Total: 429,150
  - Density: 101.65/sq mi (39.246/km^{2})
- Time zone: UTC+1 (GMT 1)

Tanout is a department of the Zinder Region in Niger. Its administrative seat is the city of Tanout. As of 2012, the department had a total population of 429,150 people.

On 15 April 2010, the Council of Ministers announced that Amadou Seybou Dioffo, a retired Captain from the Niger Armed Forces, had been appointed prefect of the department.

== Municipalities ==
Tanout Department is divided into six municipalities, listed with population as of 2012 census:

- Gangara (112,967)
- Falanko (13,993)
- Ollelewa (116,895)
- Tanout (154,238)
- Tenhia (31,057)
