= Zinder Region =

Region of Niger

Zinder
- Region
- Location within Niger
- Coordinates: 13°42′N 9°12′E
- Country: Niger
- Capital: Zinder

Government
  - Governor: Issa Moussa

Area
  - Total: 145,430 km^{2} (56,150 sq mi)

Population (2020)
  - Total: 4,873,900
  - Density: 33.514/km^{2} (86.800/sq mi)
- Time zone: UTC+1 (West Africa Time)
- HDI (2021): 0.384 low · 6th of 7

Zinder Region is one of the seven regions of Niger; the capital of the region is Zinder. The region covers 145,430 km². It is the most populous province of Niger.

== History ==
Numerous Palaeolithic and Neolithic remains, as well as cave paintings, have been found in the Termit Massif.

Zinder was the centre of the Sultanate of Damagaram, a powerful sultanate which dominated much of the surrounding region from the mid-18th century until the French conquest in the 1890s. Zinder was initially the capital of the Niger territory. However, this was moved to Niamey in 1926 and thereafter Zinder declined in importance, though it remains an important regional centre.

== Geography ==
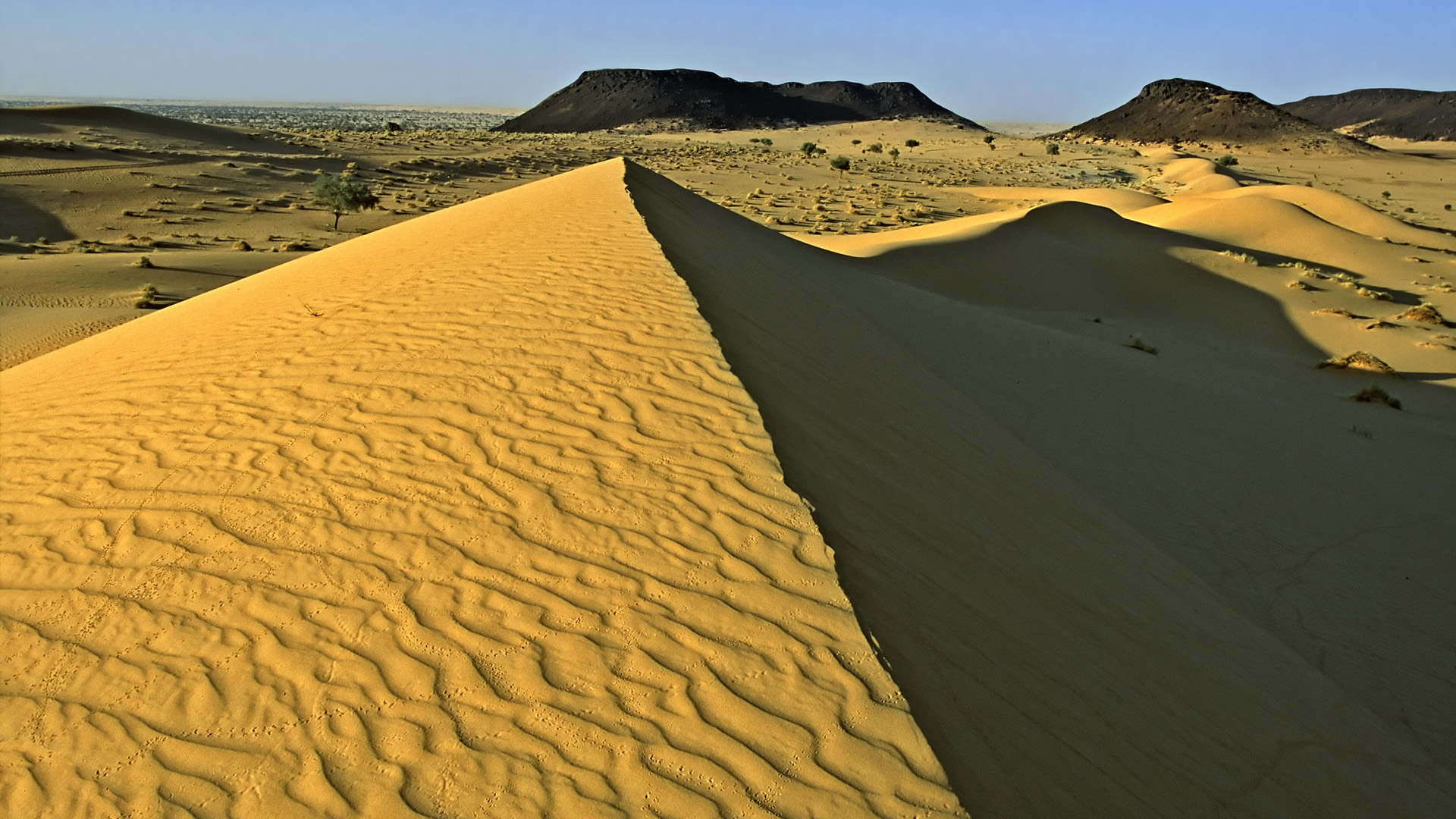
The Termit Massif in northern Zinder

Zinder Region is located in the southeast of Niger and covers 145,430 km². It borders Agadez Region to the north, Diffa Region to the east, Nigeria to the south (specifically, the states of Yobe, Jigawa and Katsina), and Maradi Region to the west. The landscape is primarily Sahelian in the south, merging into the Sahara desert in the north of the region. The terrain is predominantly flat, except for the Koutous Hills, which lie north of Kelle, and the Termit Massif in the far north of the region.

=== Settlements ===
Zinder is the regional capital; other major settlements include Alakoss, Albarkaram, Bande, Boune, Dakoussa, Dan-Barto, Dantchiao, Daouche, Dogo-Dogo, Falenko, Gaffati, Gamou, Garagoumsa, Gouchi, Gouna, Goure, Guidiguir, Hamdara, Ichirnawa, Kantche, Kelle, Kolleram, Kourni, Kwaya, Magaria, Malawa, Matameye, Mirriah, Moa, Ollelewa, Sassoumbroum, Tanout, Tenhya, Tesker, Tsaouni, Yaouri and Yekoua.

=== Administrative subdivisions ===
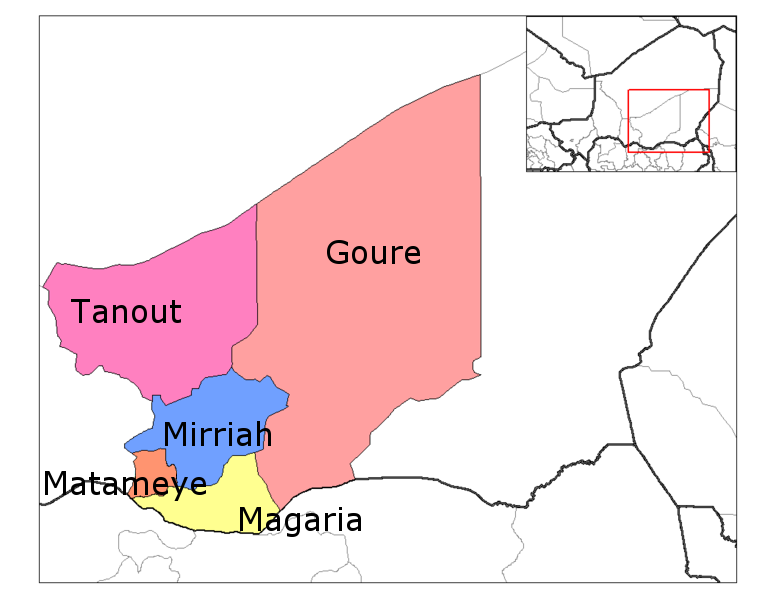
Departments of Zinder

Zinder was divided into 5 Departments:

- Goure Department
- Magaria Department
- Matameye Department
- Mirriah Department
- Tanout Department

Of the 27 administrative stations (postes administratifs) of Niger which were set out in a law dated 1 August 2011 to become departments and for which the appointment of prefects on 29 February 2012 completed the conversion, the following 5 are in Zinder region.

- Belbédji Department
- Damagaram Takaya Department
- Dungass Department
- Takiéta Department
- Tesker Department

So, Zinder now has 10 departments and the city of Zinder.

== Demographics ==
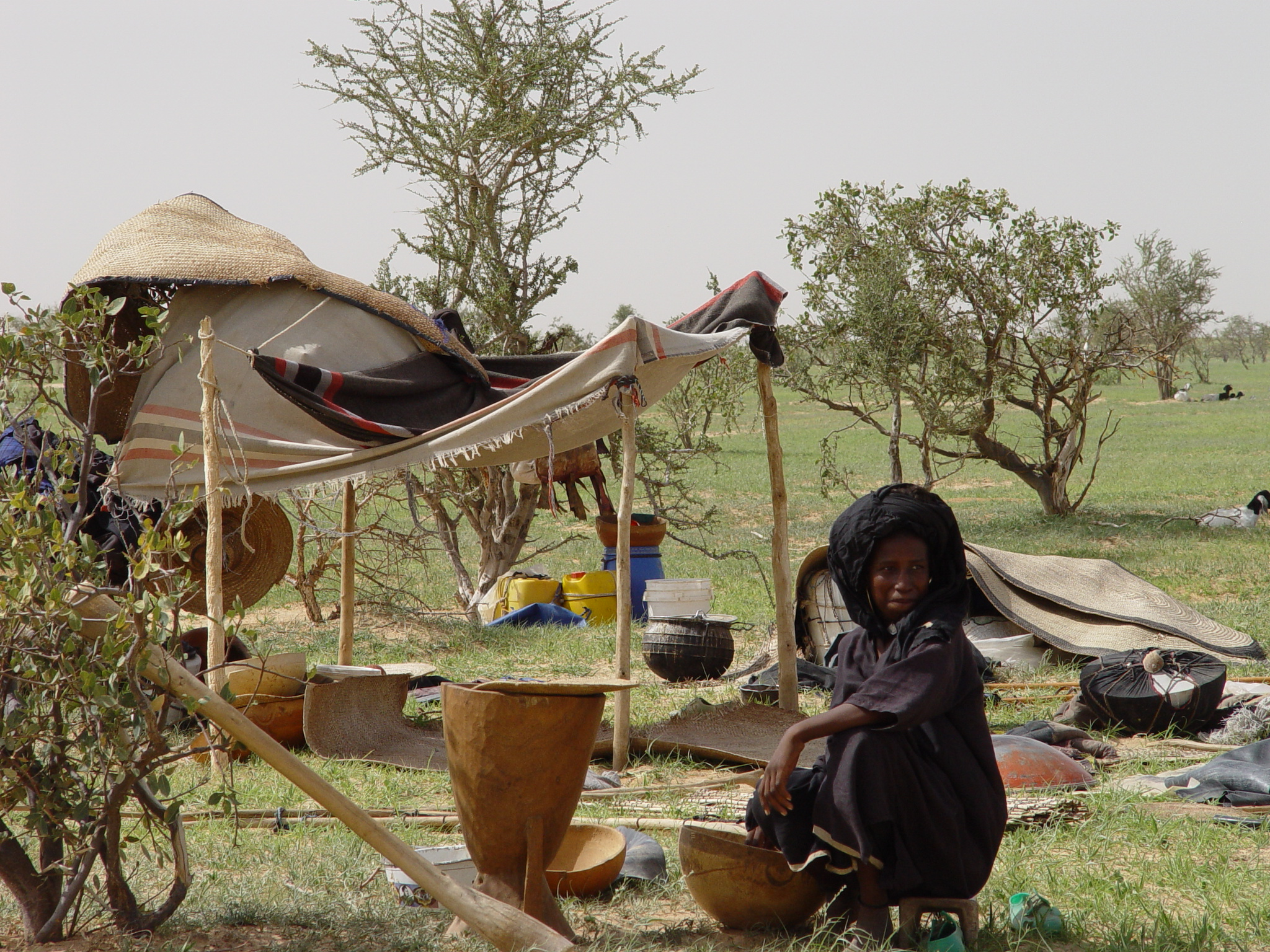
Nomads in Zinder region

As of 2012 the population of the Region was 3,539,764. The main ethnolinguistic groups are various Arab groups, Fulani, Hausa, Kanuri, Dazaga Toubou and Tuareg groups such as the Tayart Tamajeq. The Tagdal language, thought to be a mixed Songhay-Tuareg language, is also spoken.

Historical population
Year	Pop.	±%
1977	1,002,222	—
1985	1,411,061	+40.8%
2001	2,080,250	+47.4%
2012	3,539,764	+70.2%

== Economy ==
The region was the poorest in Niger and had the highest incidence of extreme poverty (60% of the population) according to World Bank data from 2018. The region was also hit hard by the 2005–2006 Niger food crisis.

== Governors ==
- Yahaya Yandaka - 2013-16
- Issa Moussa - 2016–present

== See also ==
- Regions of Niger
- Departments of Niger
- Communes of Niger
