= Regions of Niger =

Niger is divided into seven regions (French: régions; singular – région), each of which is named after its capital. Additionally, the national capital, Niamey, comprises a capital district.

== Current regions ==
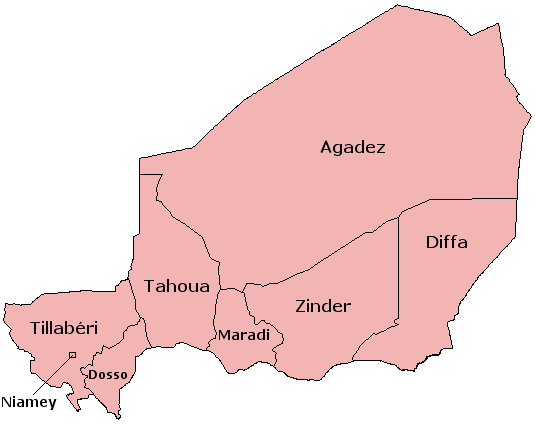
A clickable map of Niger exhibiting its seven regions.

Region	Area (km^{2})	Population (2012 census)	Population (2020 estimate)
Agadez	667,799	487,620	687,540
Diffa	156,906	593,821	837,290
Dosso	33,850	2,037,713	2,873,180
Maradi	41,796	3,402,094	4,796,950
Niamey*	402	1,026,848	1,447,860
Tahoua	113,371	3,328,365	4,692,990
Tillabéri	97,251	2,722,842	3,839,210
Zinder	155,778	3,539,764	4,991,070

*capital district.

== Current administrative structure ==
Each of Niger's regions are subdivided into departments and communes. As of 2005, there were 36 départements, divided into 265 communes, 122 cantons and 81 groupements. The latter two categories cover all areas not covered by urban communes (population over 10000) or rural communes (total population 13 million), and are governed by the department, whereas communes have had elected councils and mayors since 1999. Additional semi-autonomous subdivisions include sultanates, provinces and tributaries (tribus). The Nigerien government estimates there are an additional 17000 villages administered by rural communes, while there are a number of quartiers (boroughs or neighborhoods) administered by urban communes.

== Restructuring ==
Prior to the devolution program of 1999–2006, the regions were styled as departments. The current departments used to be called arrondissements.

=== 1992 division ===
The department of Tillabéri was created in 1992, when Niamey Region (then called "department") was split, with the areas immediately outside Niamey renamed as the capital district.

== Historical evolution ==
Prior to independence, Niger was divided into sixteen cercles as second-level administrative divisions: Agadez, Birni N'Konni, Dogondoutchi, Dosso, Filingué, Gouré, Madaoua, Magaria, Maradi, N'Guigmi, Niamey, Tahoua, Téra, Tessaoua, Tillabéry, and Zinder. Their capitals had the same names as the cercle.

After independence, the 31 December 1961 Law of territorial organization created 31 circonscriptions. The 16 colonial cercles continued to exist, and served as a level of division above these circonscriptions. Four cercles (Dogondoutchi, Filingué, N'Guigmi, and Téra) had only one circonscription. The Law of August 14, 1964 then reorganized the country into seven departments, adopting the French second-level administration naming system, in contrast to neighbor Mali, which retained the colonial cercles and regions.

== See also ==
- Departments of Niger
- Communes of Niger
- Geography of Niger
- ISO 3166-2:NE for the region codes under the ISO 3166-2 standard.
- List of FIPS region codes (M-O) for the department codes under the FIPS 10-4 standard.
