= Oil and mining industry of Niger =

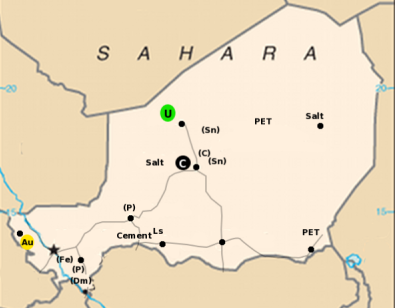
Known and exploited Mineral resources of Niger, data derived from US Geological Survey. Colored circles represent current mining centers. Unexploited but proved resources in parentheses. * Gold: Au * Coal: C * Diamond: Dm * Iron ore: Fe * Limestone: Ls * Phosphate: P * Petroleum, crude: Pet * Tin: Sn

The mineral mining industry is a crucial piece of the economy of Niger. Exports of minerals consistently account for 40% of exports.

Mineral commodities produced in Niger included cement, coal, gold, gypsum, limestone, salt, silver, tin, and uranium. In 2006, Niger was the world's fourth-ranked producer of uranium. A new mining code was adopted in August 2006 and the former National Mine research Office (ONAREM), whose responsibilities included organizing mining exploration programs, was replaced by two newly established entities: the geological and Mining Research Center and the Mining Company of Niger (SOPaMin). SOPaMin is to hold the state's shares in the existing uranium companies and is in charge of engaging in commercial transactions, such as uranium sales. Since the adoption of the new Mining Code, the government has issued a significant number of new mineral exploration permits. Niger joined the Extractive Industry Transparency Initiative (EITI) in 2005 and, as part of the EITI efforts, appointed in late 2006 a national consultative committee, which included representatives of the general public. A first audit report reconciling revenue paid by mining companies with government receipts was scheduled to be issued in late 2007.

Following the 2023 Nigerien coup d'état, the mining ministry suspended the granting of new mining licenses while it conducted an audit of the sector.

== Minerals in the National Economy ==
In 2006, Niger's mineral sector accounted for about 3% of the GDP and for about 40% of exports. according to the International Monetary Fund (IMF), a renewed interest in the generation of nuclear energy had led to increased demand for uranium, encouraged investment expansions at existing uranium mines, and promoted exploration. Foreign direct investment in the sector by renowned French company AREVA from 2008 to 2012 was projected to be $1.4 billion, which would double the country's uranium production capacity

=== Uranium ===
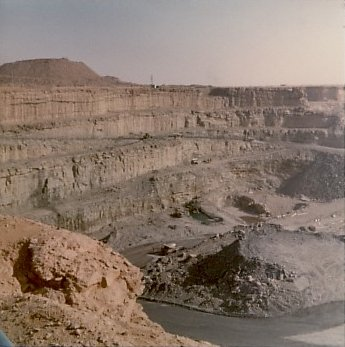
Arlit mine open pit uranium mine operated by SOMAIR near Arlit, Niger

Uranium mines, north to south from Arlit to Agadez
Mine	Operator
Samair Mine	SOMAIR
Cominak Mine	COMINAK
Madaouela Deposit	MAMICO
Imouraren Mine	Orano (revoked 2024)
DASA Deposit	Global Atomic
Azelik Mine	SOMINA

Niger produces about 5% of world uranium output, providing Africa's highest-grade uranium ore. It produced 2,020 tonnes of uranium in 2022, down from 4,821 tonnes in 2012 and 2,991 tonnes in 2020.

From the 1950s, Niger has been known to have large uranium deposits in the desert north of the Agadez Region, which is located about 1,000 kilometres (620 mi) northeast of Niamey. In 1971, the first mine was opened outside Arlit and operated by SOMAIR, a national company with Areva and the government of Niger as shareholders. SOMAIR was owned by Areva (63.4%) and the government of Niger (36.6%), and employed about 600 people.

From 1978 to 2021, the second uranium mining project in Akokan near Arlit produced 75,000 tonnes of uranium. It was operated by COMINAK, a national company, like SOMAIR with Areva and the government of Niger as shareholders. COMINAK was owned by Areva NC (34%), the government of Niger(31%), Overseas Uranium Resources Development Company of Japan (25%), and Enusa industrias avanzadas, S.a. of Spain (10%). It employed about 1,100 people. The underground mine of Akokan was the largest underground uranium mine in the world. The mining activities created an economic boom in the country, as Nigerien budgets flourished in the 1970s due to record uranium prices. Extracted uranium from SOMAIR and COMINAK was initially sold entirely by French concessionary corporations, with contracts later revised to give Niger both an overall contract payment, rent, and a smaller amount of ore it could sell on world markets.

In addition to the mines of SOMAIR and COMINAK, the Azelik mine at 200 kilometres (120 mi) of Arlit was opened in 2011 and operated by SOMINA. The stakeholders in SOMINA are:

- China National Nuclear Corporation (37.2%)
- the government of Niger through the national mining company (SOPAMIN) (33%)
- ZXJOY, a Chinese company (24.8%)
- KORES, a Korean national company (5%).

Uranium ore mined in the Arlit area (Agadez Region) is extracted as triuranium octoxide (U_{3}O_{8}).

- The SOMAIR mine had uranium reserve of 14,000 tonnes (with U_{3}O_{8} @ 0.3%) as of 2011 and a production capacity of 2,700 tonnes per year.
- The COMINAK concession totaled 29,000 tonnes (U_{3}O_{8} @ 0.4%) and had a production capacity of 1,500 tonnes per year. The Azelik mine operated by SOMINA had a production rate of 700 tonnes per year in 2011, and was expected to increase to 2500 tonnes per year by 2015.

The Imouraren mine, construction currently suspended, is expected to have the largest uranium reserves in Niger (120,000 tonnes) albeit at a lower concentration of uranium (U_{3}O_{8} @ 0.15%). The mine, located about 80 kilometres (50 mi) south of Arlit, was granted in July 2006 to Areva for an ore body originally discovered in 1969. One hundred people were employed at the site in 2006; more than 55 kilometres (34 mi) of development drilling had been completed at the site during a period of one year and more than 2 tonnes of ore had been shipped for testing to Areva's laboratories. It was however decided in 2014 by Areva and the government of Niger following new contract discussions that plan to launch the mine will delayed pending favorable market conditions.

The Nigerian people believe that the partnership with France is quite unequal.According to Niger Energy Minister, in 2010, Niger exported nearly 3.5 billion euros of uranium mines to France, but only earned 459 million in profits. Since the coup in Niger at the end of July 2023, calls for France to withdraw have never stopped due to local opposition. In addition to raising prices, the military government also threatened to ban France from continuing to mine uranium.

In June 2024, the military government of Niger decided to revoke the uranium mining license of the French state-owned Orano Nuclear Energy Group in the Imouraren mine in the country. The mine is located west of Ayr in northern Niger and is considered one of the largest uranium deposits in the world, with reserves of 200,000 tons, later in July, the Niger government decided to revoke the Madaouela uranium mine license of Canada's GoviEx Uranium.

In July 2024, the U.S. African Discovery Group signed a letter of intent for a uranium exploration licence for the Ouricha-3 deposit, in the Agadez Region 20 km south of the Imouraren mine.

As of August 2024, Global Atomic is continuing to develop its Dasa Uranium mine and processing plant, which employs over 450 people increasing later to 900. It is expected to be the highest-grade uranium project in Africa and start operating in 2026. It is located about 35 kilometres (22 mi) southeast of the Ouricha-3 deposit.

In December 2024, Orano announced that it had "lost operational control" of its mining subsidiary Somaïr in Niger.

In March 2025, IAEA Director General Rafael Grossi visited Niger to meet with Prime Minister Ali Lamine Zeine and officials, and to visit the COMINAK and SOMAIR uranium mines. He noted Niger currently produces about 5% of world's uranium ore, though Orano and GoviEx had both initiated international arbitration proceedings against Niger.

GoviEx had suspended arbitration proceedings in January 2025 to allow negotiations to proceed. In November 2025, GoviEx merged with Tombador Iron creating Atomic Eagle, which in August 2026 announced it had reached a commercial resolution with the Niger government to create MAMICO, a Nigerien subsidiary with Atomic Eagle holding a 60% share and the Niger government holding 40%. This was granted an exploitation permit for the Madaouela mine, south-east of the existing COMINAK mine.

In June 2025, the State of Niger decided, during a Council of Ministers meeting, "to nationalize the Société des mines de l'Aïr. According to the Nigerien government, the shares and assets of Somaïr are fully transferred to the State of Niger".

=== Coal ===
The history of coal exploration and mining dates back to 1968 when coal reserves were discovered in Anou Araren by an exploration team led by the French Atomic Commission Commissariat à l'énergie atomique. This discovery and the parallel discovery and exploitation of uranium mines in the same region of Niger lead to the creation of SONICHAR in 1975. The goal was to mine coal which will be used as a fuel to power the thermal power plants in order to supply power to uranium mining activities in Arlit. In 1980, coal mining began at Anou Araren and a year later, the thermal power plant was in operation. Since then, coal mining projects have stagnated. In 2008, coal reserves . In 2014, construction for the second coal mine began in Salkadamna in Takanamatt, Tahoua Region. The coal extracted from the mine will supply a 600 MW power plant and coal briquette plant adjacent to the mine.
The Anou Araren coal reserves are estimated at 15 million tonnes and in 2011, 246,016 tonnes of coal were extracted from the mine. The coal reserves at Salkadamna are estimated at 70 million tonnes.

=== Gold ===
Exploitable deposits of gold have long been known to exist in south western region of Niger and more recently in northern region of Agadez. Artisanal gold mining was already conducted between the Niger River and the border with Burkina Faso. In 2004, the Samira Hill Gold Mine, operated by Mining company of Liptako, began production. The mining company of Liptako owned by two Canadian companies at 40% each and the government of Niger at 20%. The gold production in 2011 is 1,564 kg from this mine and has decreased steadily since 2008. In 2014, two gold deposits have been found in the Agadez Region in Djado and Mount Ibl, 700 and 360 km from Agadez city, respectively. The site in Djado was discovered in April 2014 and resulted in a gold rush that attracted local inhabitants of Agadez as well as prospectors from neighboring countries like Chad, Sudan and Burkina Faso. Activities at the Djado site were temporarily ceased in order to organize exploration and artisanal extraction activities, to improve infrastructures, principally water supply and to improve the security presence. The site near Mount Ibl was discovered in September 2014. Exploration permits are required for all prospectors prior to accessing the sites.

=== Cement ===
The cement extraction industry has existed in Niger since 1964 when the Malbaza cement plant was opened. Located in the Tahoua Region, the cement plant has been the only such project until 2014. In 2011, work for expanding the cement plant of Malbaza began with the expectation to increase its production capacity 13-fold. In 2014, work began for a new cement plant in Keita in the Tahoua Region.
The Malbaza cement plant presently produces 40,000 tonnes per year and, upon expansion, is expected to reach 540,000 tonnes per year. The Keita cement under construction is expected to produce 1 million tonnes per year at startup and 1.5 million tonnes per year afterwards.

== Oil industry ==
Oil was first found by Texaco and Esso in 1975 in the Agadem oilfield, in the far east of the country.

Niger signed a production-sharing agreement with the China National Petroleum Corporation (CNPC) in June 2008. A small oil refinery with capacity of around 20,000-barrel-per-day (3,200 m^{3}/d) was built by CNPC near Zinder, which started production in November 2011 mostly for the domestic market. The refinery is operated by the Society of the Zinder Refinery (SORAZ). A 462 kilometres (287 mi) pipeline connects the oilfield to the refinery. Government revenue from this is over $100 million per year, about 5% of Niger's GDP, and slightly higher than from the uranium extraction industry.

Niger made an export agreement with CNPC for crude oil from the Agadem oilfield. As of 2023, China is building a new oil pipeline to export light, high-quality oil through Benin. Oil exported through this pipeline could provide up to 45% of Niger's tax revenue. Operations are expected to start in 2024.

== Labor issues ==
According to the U.S. Department of Labor, 47.8% of children aged 5 to 14 are working children and 4.3% of them are engaged in hazardous activities in the industrial sector, mining for trona, salt, gypsum, natron and gold. The Department's 2014 List of Goods Produced by Child Labor or Forced Labor reported that Niger's mining industry still resorts to such practices in the production of these goods.

== See also ==
- Economy of Niger
- Niger uranium forgeries
- List of countries by gold production
- List of countries by uranium production
- Uranium reserves (list by nation)
