= Economy of Niger =

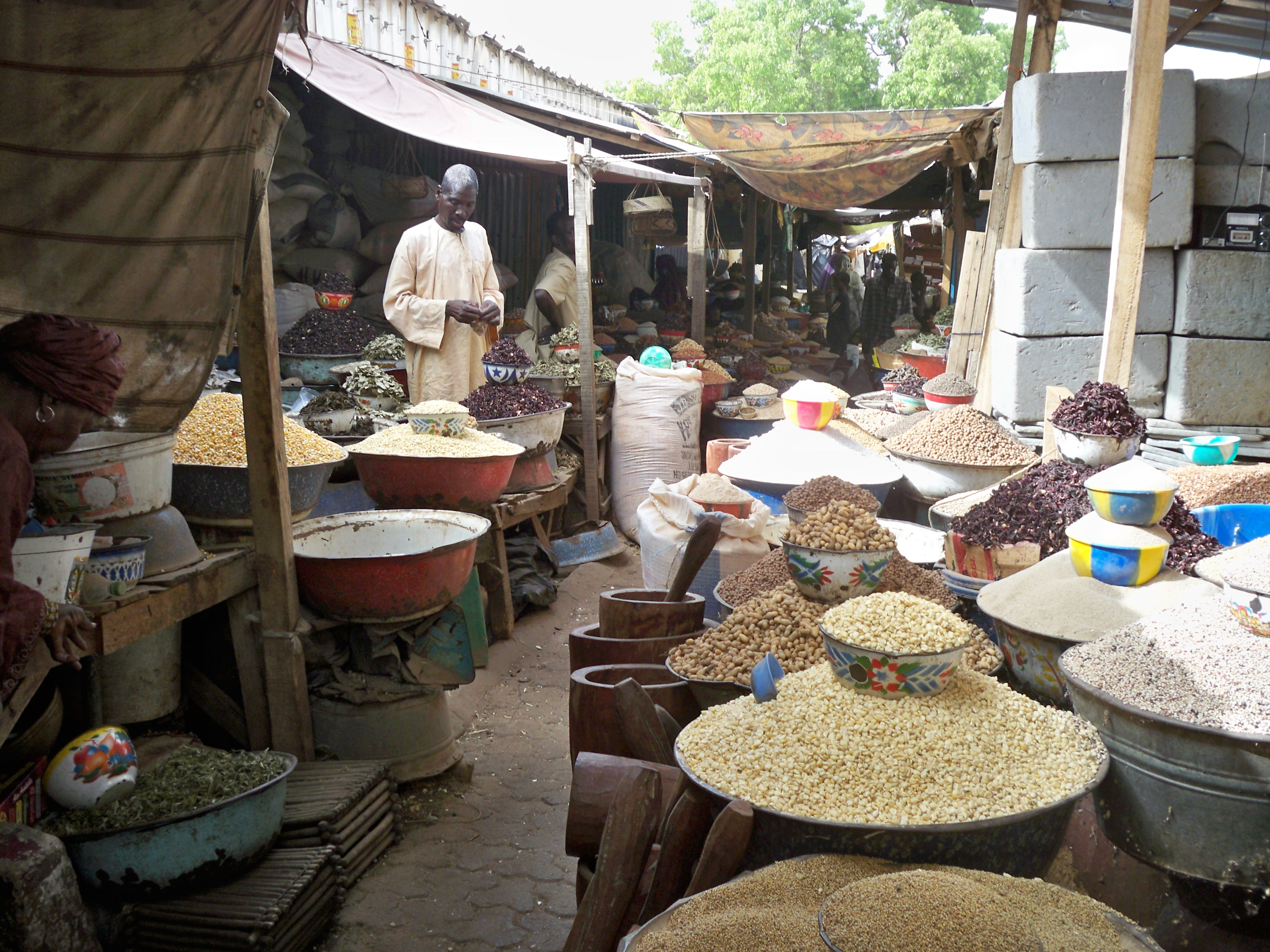
- Petit Marché in Niamey
- Currency: West African CFA franc (XOF)
- Fixed exchange rates: €1 = 655.957 XOF
- Trade organisations: AU, AfCFTA, ECOWAS, CEN-SAD, WTO
- Country group: Least Developed; Low-income economy

Statistics
- GDP: ▲$24.81 Billion (nominal; 2026); ▲$61.04 Billion (PPP; 2025f)
- GDP rank: 125th (nominal; 2025); 128th (PPP; 2025)
- GDP growth: ▲6.6% (2025f)
- GDP per capita: ▲$740 (nominal; 2026); ▲$2,100 (PPP; 2025)
- GDP per capita rank: 178th (nominal; 2025); 176th (PPP; 2025)
- Inflation (CPI): 7.829% (2024)
- Population below national poverty line: 44.5% (2014); 44.5% on less than $1.90/day (2014)
- Gini coefficient: 34.3 medium (2014)
- Human Development Index: ▲0.394 low (2022) (189th); 0.272 IHDI (2018)
- Labour force: ▲9,198,681 (2019)
- Labour force by occupation: Agriculture: 87%; Industry: 4%; Services: 9%; (2016)
- Unemployment: 0.55% (2023 est.)
- Main industries: Uranium mining, petroleum, cement, brick, soap, textiles, food processing, chemicals, slaughterhouses

External
- Exports: $1.376 billion (2022 est.)
- Main export partners: UAE 69%; France 9%; China 9%; Nigeria 3%; Mali 2%; (2022)
- Imports: $2.194 billion (2017. est)
- Main import partners: China 22%; France 14%; Nigeria 8%; Germany 5%; UAE 5%; (2022)
- Gross external debt: $3.688 billion (2022 est.)

Public finance
- Revenue: $1.68 billion (2017. est)
- Spending: $2.235 billion (2017 est.)
- All values, unless otherwise stated, are in US dollars.

Niger has a developing economy considered low-income. It was $22.97 billion US dollars in 2025, according to official data from the International Monetary Fund. The economy is based largely on internal markets, subsistence agriculture, and the export of raw commodities: foodstuffs to neighboring countries and uranium and other raw materials to global markets. Niger, a landlocked West African nation that straddles the Sahel, has consistently ranked among the lowest on the Human Development Index (HDI), with a value of 0.394 in 2019. It has a very low per capita income, and ranks among the least developed and most heavily indebted countries in the world, despite having large raw commodities and a relatively stable government and society not currently affected by civil war or terrorism. Economic activity centers on subsistence agriculture, animal husbandry, re-export trade, and export of uranium.

The 50% devaluation of the West African CFA franc in January 1994 boosted exports of livestock, cowpeas, onions, and the products of Niger's small cotton industry. Exports of cattle to neighboring Nigeria, as well as groundnuts and oil remain the primary non-mineral exports. The government relies on bilateral and multilateral aid – which was suspended briefly following coups in 1996 and 1999 – for operating expenses and public investment. Short-term prospects depend on continued World Bank and IMF debt relief and extended aid. The post-1999 government has broadly adhered to privatization and market deregulation plans instituted by these funders. Niger is a least developed country according to the United Nations.

== Overall ==
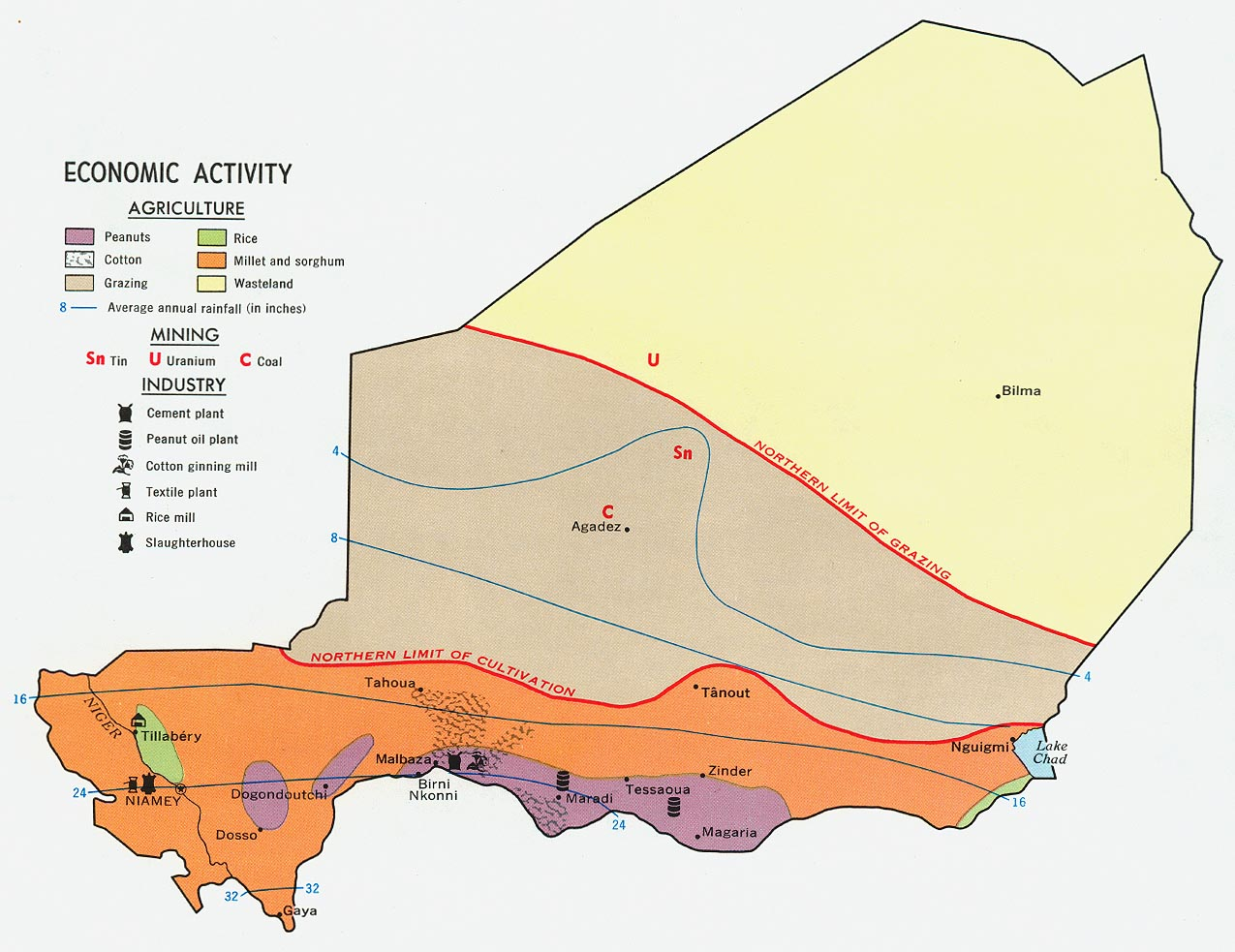
Economic map of Niger (1969). Peanut cultivation areas in purple, Rice in green, The remainder of agricultural land in orange. The northern limits of seasonal livestock forage is in brown.

Niger's economy is based largely on subsistence crops, livestock, and some of the world's largest uranium deposits. Drought cycles, desertification, a 3.4% population growth rate and the drop in world demand for uranium have undercut an already marginal economy. Traditional subsistence farming, herding, small trading, and informal markets dominate an economy that generates few formal sector jobs. Between 1988 and 1995 28% to 30% of the total economy of Niger was in the unregulated informal sector, including small and even large scale rural and urban production, transport and services.

== History ==
The GDP per capita of Niger grew 10% in the 1960s. However, this proved unsustainable and it consequently shrank by 27% in the 1980s and a further 48% in the 1990s. Much of this GDP is explained through the exploitation of uranium at Arlit in the far north of the country. Ore is partially processed on site by foreign mining corporations and transported by truck to Benin. Fluctuation of GDP can be mapped to changes in international uranium prices, as well as price negotiations with the main mining company, France's Orano Cycle. Price rises in the mid-1970s were followed by a collapse in the market price through much of the 1980s and 1990s. Thus the country's GDP per capita has little direct impact on the average Nigerien, although uranium funds much government operation. The 2006 Human Development Index ranked Niger sixth from worst in the world, with a HDI of 0.370: 174 of 179 nations.

The economic competitiveness created by the January 1994 devaluation of the Communauté Financière Africaine (CFA) franc contributed to an annual average economic growth of 3.5% throughout the mid-1990s. But the economy stagnated due to the sharp reduction in foreign aid in 1999 (which gradually resumed in 2000) and poor rains in 2000. Reflecting the importance of the agricultural sector, the return of good rains was the primary factor underlying economic growth of 5.1% in 2000, 3.1% in 2001, 6.0% in 2002, and 3.0% in 2003.

In recent years, the Government of Niger drafted revisions to the investment code (1997 and 2000), petroleum code (1992), and mining code (1993), all with attractive terms for investors. The present government actively seeks foreign private investment and considers it key to restoring economic growth and development. With the assistance of the United Nations Development Programme (UNDP), it has undertaken a concerted effort to revitalize the private sector.

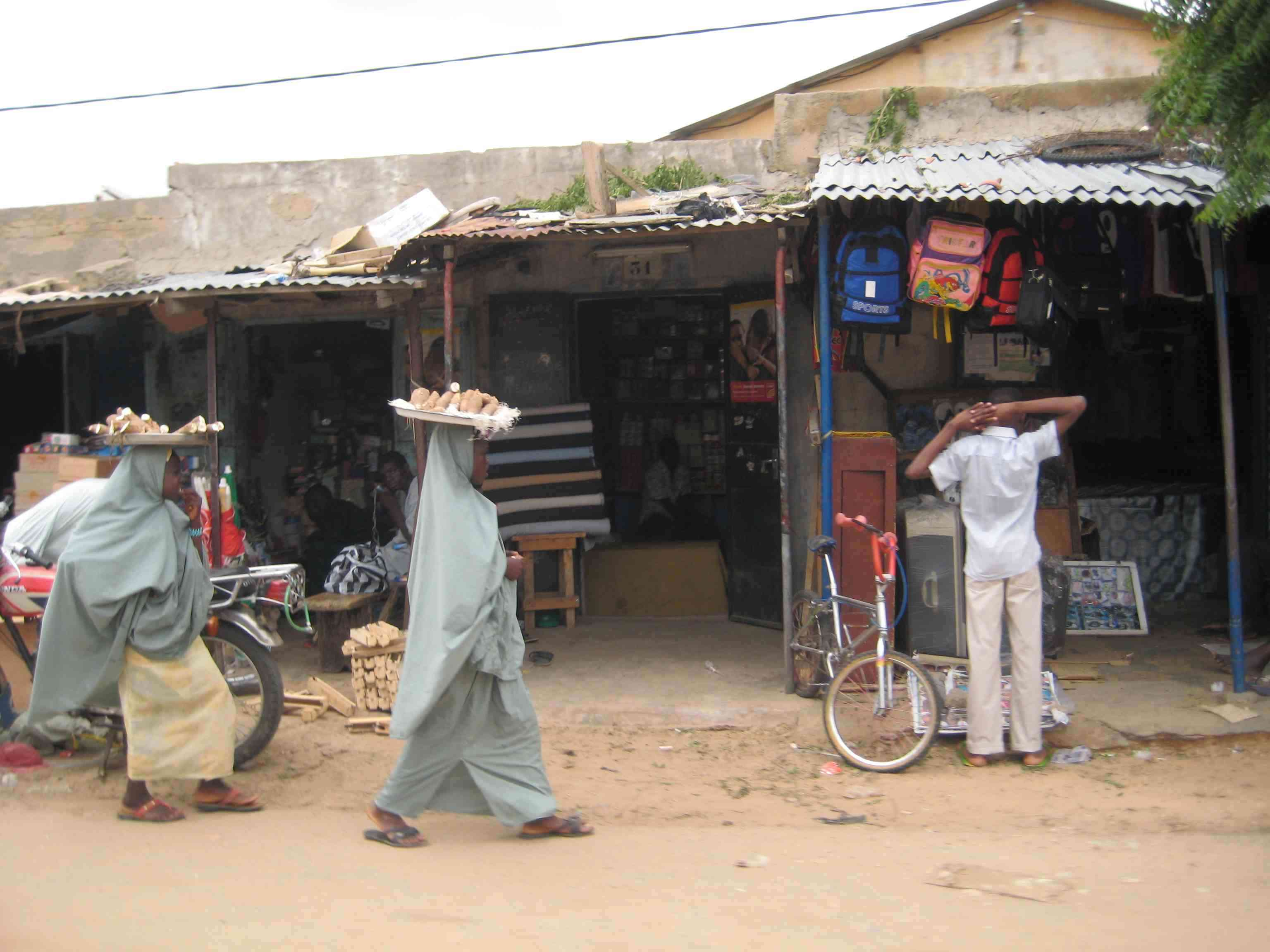
A market in Maradi.

=== Economic reforms ===
In January 2000, Niger's newly elected government inherited serious financial and economic problems including a virtually empty treasury, past-due salaries (11 months of unpaid salaries) and scholarship payments, increased debt, reduced revenue performance, and lower public investment. In December 2000, Niger qualified for enhanced debt relief under the International Monetary Fund program for Highly Indebted Poor Countries and concluded an agreement with the Fund on a Poverty Reduction and Growth Facility (PRGF).

In addition to changes in the budgetary process and public finances, the new government has pursued economic restructuring towards the IMF promoted privatization model. This has included the privatization of water distribution and telecommunications and the removal of price protections for petroleum products, allowing prices to be set by world market prices. Further privatizations of public enterprises are in the works.

In its effort to comply with the IMF's Poverty Reduction and Growth Facility plan, the government is also taking action to reduce corruption and, as the result of a participatory process encompassing civil society, has devised a Poverty Reduction Strategy Plan that focuses on improving health, primary education, rural infrastructure, and judicial restructuring.

A long planned privatization of the Nigerien power company, NIGELEC, failed in 2001 and again in 2003 due to a lack of buyers. SONITEL, the nation's telephone operator which was separated from the post office and privatised in 2001, was renationalised in 2009. Critics have argued that the obligations to creditor institutions and governments have locked Niger into a process of trade liberalization that is harmful for small farmers and in particular, rural women.

== Currency ==
Niger shares a common currency, the CFA franc, and a common central bank, the Central Bank of West African States (BCEAO), with six other members of the West African Monetary Union. The Treasury of the Government of France supplements the BCEAO's international reserves in order to maintain a fixed rate of 100 CFA (Communauté Financière Africaine) to the French franc (to the euro as of January 1, 2002).

== Foreign aid ==
The most important donors in Niger are France, the European Union, the World Bank, the IMF and other United Nations agencies (UNDP, UNICEF, FAO, WFP, NGOs, and UNFPA). Other principal donors include the United States, Belgium, Germany, Switzerland, Canada, and Saudi Arabia. USAID does not have an office in Niger, the United States contributes nearly $10 million each year to Niger's development. The US is also a major partner in policy coordination in such areas as food security and HIV/AIDS. The importance of external support for Niger's development is demonstrated by the fact that some 45% of the government's FY 2002 budget, including 80% of its capital budget, derives from donor resources.

In 2005 the UN drew attention to the increased need for foreign aid given severe problems with drought and locusts resulting in a famine endangering the lives of around a million people.

== External trade and investment ==
=== Exports ===
Exports of Niger by product category (2019) Chemical products Transportation Machines Mineral products Plastics and rubbers Metals Foodstuffs Precious metals Textiles Instruments Animal products Vegetable products Paper goods Footwear and headwear Miscellaneous Stone and glass Wood products Animal and vegetable bi-products Animal hides Arts and antiques Weapons

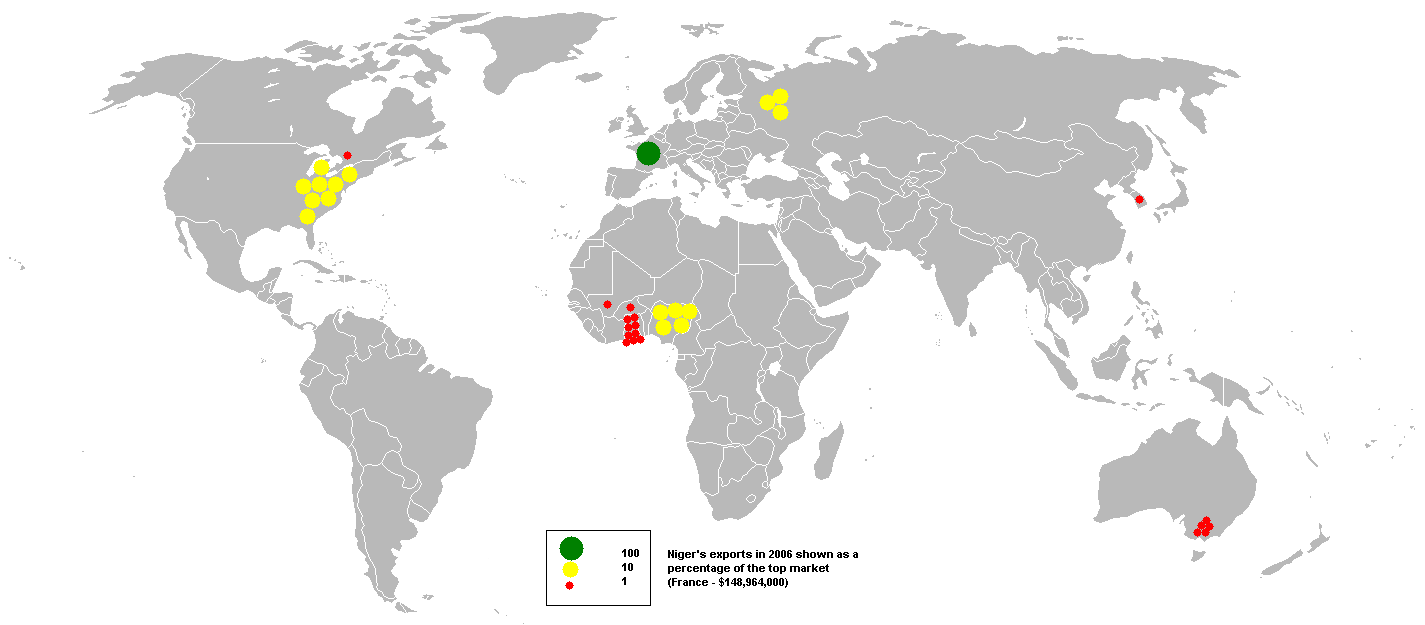
Niger's exports in 2006

Of Niger's exports, foreign exchange earnings from livestock, although impossible to quantify, are second only to those from uranium. Actual exports far exceed official statistics, which often fail to detect large herds of animals informally crossing into Nigeria. Some hides and skins are exported and some are transformed into handicrafts.

Cargo imported into Niger must be covered by a bordereau électronique de suivi des cargaisons (BESC), an electronic cargo tracking note that is obtained before shipment and presented to customs during clearance.

=== Foreign investment ===
In recent years, the Government of Niger promulgated revisions to the investment code (1997 and 2000), petroleum code (1992), and mining code (1993), all with attractive terms for investors. The present government actively seeks foreign private investment and considers it key to restoring economic growth and development. With the assistance of the United Nations Development Programme (UNDP), it has undertaken a concerted effort to revitalize the sector.

== Macro-economic trend ==
Historical development of real GDP per capita in Niger, since 1950

The following table shows the main economic indicators in 1980–2020 (with IMF staff estimates in 2021–2026). Inflation below 5% is in green. The annual unemployment rate is extracted from the World Bank, although the International Monetary Fund finds these figures unreliable.

1980-2000

Year	GDP (in bil. US$PPP)	GDP per capita (in US$ PPP)	GDP (in bil. US$nominal)	GDP per capita (in US$ nominal)	GDP growth (real)	Inflation rate (in percent)	Unemployment (in percent)	Government debt (in % of GDP)
1980	4.1	704.0	3.5	609.4	▲4.9%	▲7.3%	n/a	n/a
1981	▲4.5	▲743.8	▼3.1	▼510.0	▼-0.2%	▲24.3%	n/a	n/a
1982	▲4.8	▲779.9	▼2.8	▼458.1	▲2.2%	▲10.4%	n/a	n/a
1983	4.8	▼753.0	▼2.5	▼395.7	▼-3.9%	▲1.6%	n/a	n/a
1984	▼4.2	▼627.5	▼2.1	▼310.0	▼-16.8%	▲8.4%	n/a	n/a
1985	▲4.6	▲674.9	▼2.0	▼295.8	▲7.7%	▲-1.1%	n/a	n/a
1986	▲5.0	▲709.2	▲2.7	▲378.7	▲6.4%	▲-3.2%	n/a	n/a
1987	▲5.1	▼704.8	▲3.1	▲430.4	▲0.1%	▲-6.6%	n/a	n/a
1988	▲5.7	▲755.9	▲3.2	▼426.0	▲6.9%	▲0.6%	n/a	n/a
1989	▲6.0	▲768.7	▼3.1	▼394.7	▲1.0%	▲-0.8%	n/a	n/a
1990	▲6.1	▼762.9	▲3.5	▲435.3	▼-1.3%	▲-2.0%	n/a	n/a
1991	▲6.3	▼760.2	▼3.3	▼394.9	▼-0.4%	▲1.5%	1.4%	n/a
1992	▲6.6	▲767.0	▲3.4	▼393.7	▲2.0%	▲-5.9%	1.4%	n/a
1993	▲6.7	▼761.3	▼3.0	▼343.2	▲0.3%	▲-0.3%	1.4%	n/a
1994	▲7.0	▲765.2	▼1.9	▼211.0	▲1.9%	▲35.5%	1.4%	n/a
1995	▲7.3	▲773.5	▲2.3	▲242.0	▲2.5%	▲10.9%	1.4%	69.4%
1996	▲7.5	▼761.5	▲2.4	▲244.0	▲0.1%	▲5.3%	1.4%	▼63.5%
1997	▲7.7	▼759.3	▼2.3	▼224.5	▲1.5%	▲2.9%	1.4%	▲69.1%
1998	▲8.6	▲815.0	▲2.6	▲250.2	▲10.0%	▲4.6%	1.4%	▼61.3%
1999	▲8.7	▼795.9	▼2.5	▼231.7	▼-0.2%	▲-2.1%	▲1.5%	▲63.3%
2000	▲8.8	▼775.4	▼2.2	▼197.3	▼-1.2%	▲2.7%	1.5%	▲82.1%

2001 onward

Year	GDP (in bil. US$PPP)	GDP per capita (in US$ PPP)	GDP (in bil. US$nominal)	GDP per capita (in US$ nominal)	GDP growth (real)	Inflation rate (in percent)	Unemployment (in percent)	Government debt (in % of GDP)
2001	▲9.6	▲819.6	▲2.4	▲207.8	▲7.3%	▲3.9%	1.5%	▼74.0%
2002	▲10.3	▲842.1	▲2.8	▲227.4	▲4.9%	▲2.5%	▲1.9%	▼69.0%
2003	▲10.7	▲844.8	▲3.4	▲267.4	▲2.2%	▲-1.5%	▲2.3%	▼60.6%
2004	▲11.0	▼838.9	▲3.7	▲285.4	▲0.4%	▲0.2%	▲2.7%	▼55.1%
2005	▲12.2	▲894.5	▲4.4	▲320.9	▲7.3%	▲7.8%	▲3.1%	▼49.5%
2006	▲13.3	▲940.4	▲4.7	▲335.3	▲5.9%	▲0.0%	▼2.6%	▼18.3%
2007	▲14.1	▲959.3	▲5.7	▲389.3	▲3.1%	▲0.1%	▼2.2%	▼17.8%
2008	▲15.5	▲1,014.5	▲7.3	▲477.3	▲7.7%	▲11.3%	▼1.7%	▼14.2%
2009	▲15.9	▼1,003.4	7.3	▼462.3	▲2.0%	▲0.5%	▼1.3%	▲15.9%
2010	▲17.5	▲1,060.6	▲7.8	▲476.1	▲8.6%	▲0.9%	▼0.8%	▼15.1%
2011	▲18.2	▲1,066.1	▲8.8	▲511.5	▲2.4%	▲2.9%	▼0.3%	▼14.7%
2012	▲20.6	▲1,156.1	▲9.4	▲528.9	▲10.5%	▲0.5%	▲2.2%	▲18.1%
2013	▲20.8	▼1,125.3	▲10.2	▲551.6	▲5.3%	▲2.3%	▼1.4%	▲19.6%
2014	▲21.9	▲1,138.8	▲10.8	▲562.9	▲6.6%	▲-0.9%	▼0.5%	▲22.1%
2015	▲22.9	▲1,145.2	▼9.7	▼484.2	▲4.4%	▲1.0%	0.5%	▲29.9%
2016	▲23.9	▲1,148.3	▲10.4	▲497.9	▲5.7%	▲0.2%	0.5%	▲32.8%
2017	▲25.1	▲1,163.6	▲11.2	▲517.8	▲5.0%	▲0.2%	0.5%	▲36.5%
2018	▲27.6	▲1,229.6	▲12.9	▲572.6	▲7.2%	▲2.8%	0.5%	▲36.9%
2019	▲29.7	▲1,276.1	12.9	▼553.9	▲5.9%	▲-2.5%	▲0.6%	▲39.8%
2020	▲30.5	▼1,258.7	▲13.7	▲565.9	▲1.2%	▲2.8%	0.6%	▲44.2%
2021	▲33.2	▲1,319.6	▲15.9	▲632.6	▲6.9%	▲0.4%	n/a	▲44.5%
2022	▲38.3	▲1,466.6	▲18.5	▲710.3	▲12.8%	▲2.0%	n/a	▼42.0%
2023	▲43.5	▲1,605.9	▲21.0	▲777.6	▲11.1%	▲2.0%	n/a	▼39.9%
2024	▲47.3	▲1,685.4	▲22.9	▲816.6	▲6.6%	▲2.0%	n/a	▼39.2%
2025	▲51.3	▲1,760.8	▲24.9	▲853.6	▲6.3%	▲2.0%	n/a	▼38.8%
2026	▲55.3	▲1,830.5	▲26.8	▲888.5	▲5.8%	▲2.0%	n/a	▼38.7%

== Statistics ==
GDP: purchasing power parity – $21.86 billion (2017 est.)

GDP – real growth rate: 4.9% (2017 est.)

GDP – per capita: purchasing power parity – $1,200 (2017 est.)

GDP – composition by sector:
agriculture: 41.6%
industry: 19.5%
services: 38.7% (2017)

Population below poverty line: 45.4% (2014 est.)

Household income or consumption by percentage share:
lowest 10%: 3%
highest 10%: 29.3% (1992)

Inflation rate (consumer prices): 2.4% (2017 est.)

Labour force: 6.5 million (2017 est.)

Labour force – by occupation: agriculture 79.2%, industry: 3.3%, services: 17.5% (2012 est.)

Unemployment rate: 0.3% (2017 est.)

Budget:
revenues: $1.757 billion (2017 est.)
expenditures: 2.171 billion (2017 est.)

Industries: uranium mining, cement, brick, textiles, food processing, chemicals, slaughterhouses

Industrial production growth rate: 6% (2017 est.)

electrification: total population: 15% (2013)

electrification: urban areas: 62% (2013)

electrification: rural areas: 4% (2013)

Electricity – production: 494.7 million kWh (2016 est.)

Electricity – production by source:
fossil fuel: 95%
renewable: 5%
nuclear: 0%
other: 0% (2017)

Electricity – consumption: 1.065 billion kWh (2016 est.)

Electricity – exports: 0 kWh (2016 est.)

Electricity – imports: 779 million kWh (2016 est.)

Agriculture – products: cowpeas, cotton, peanuts, pearl millet, sorghum, cassava (tapioca), rice; cattle, sheep, goats, camels, donkeys, horses, poultry

Exports: $4.143 billion (2017 est.)

Exports – commodities: uranium ore, livestock, cowpeas, onions

Exports – partners: France 30.2%, Thailand 18.3%, Malaysia 9.9%, Nigeria 8.3%, Mali 5%, Switzerland 4.9% (2017)

Imports: $1.829 billion (2017 est.)

Imports – commodities: foodstuffs, machinery, vehicles and parts, petroleum, cereals

Imports – partners: France 28.8%, China 14.4%, Malaysia 5.7%, Nigeria 5.4%, Thailand 5.3%, US 5.1%, India 4.9% (2017)

Debt – external: $3.728 billion (31 December 2017 est.)

Economic aid – recipient: $222 million (1995)

Currency: 1 Communauté Financière Africaine franc (CFAF) = 100 centimes

Exchange rates: Communauté Financière Africaine francs (CFAF) per US$1 – 670 (January 2000), 560.01 (January 1999), 589.95 (1998), 583.67 (1997), 511.55 (1996), 499.15 (1995)
note: since 1 January 1999, the CFAF is pegged to the euro at a rate of 655.957 CFA francs per euro

Fiscal year: calendar year

== Economic sectors ==
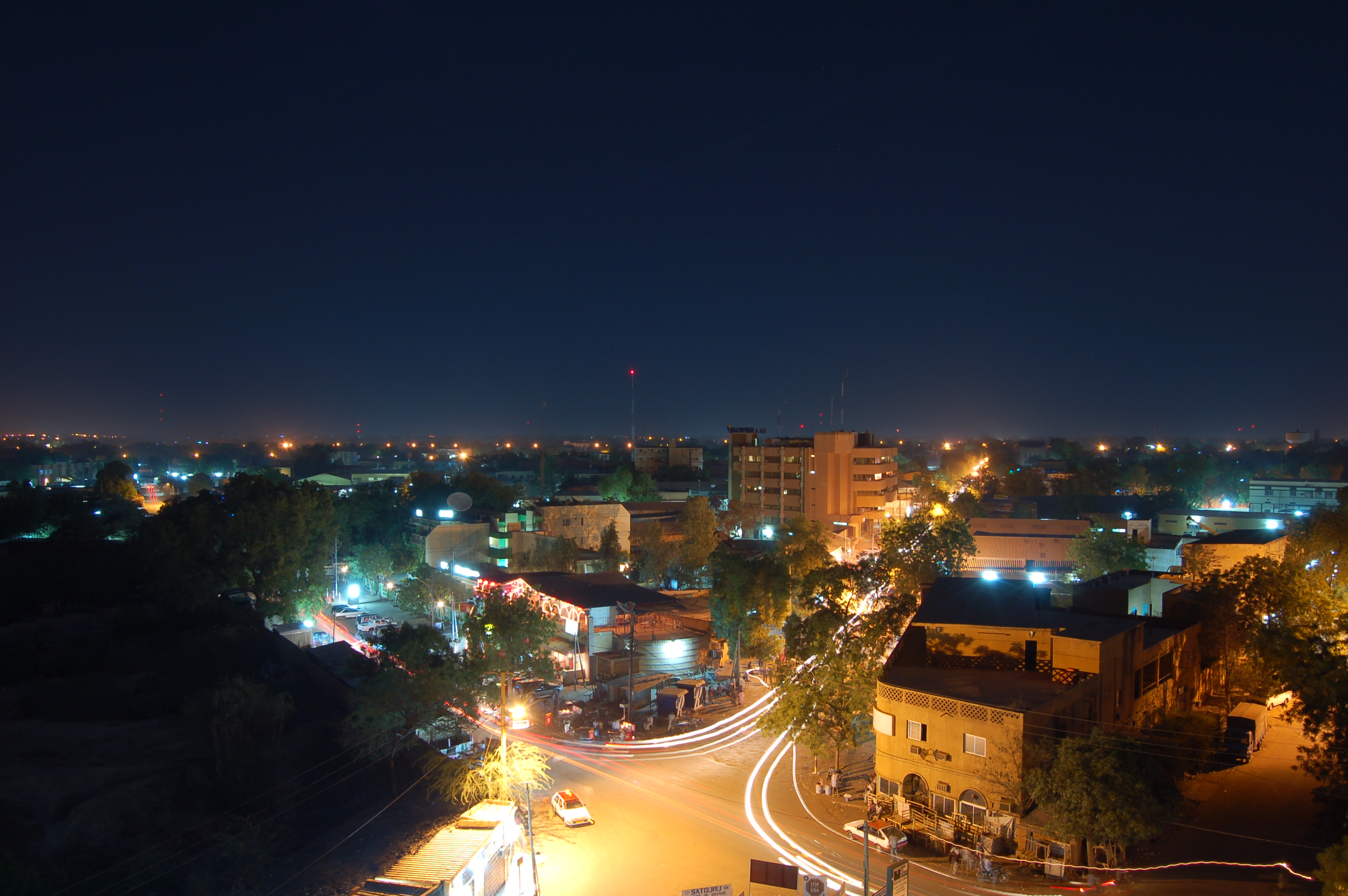
Niamey, Niger's capital and economic hub.

The economy of Niger centers on subsistence crops, livestock, and some of the world's largest uranium deposits. Drought cycles, desertification, a 2.9% population growth rate, and the drop in world demand for uranium have undercut the economy.

Niger shares a common currency, the CFA franc, and a common central bank, the Central Bank of West African States (BCEAO), with seven other members of the West African Monetary Union. Niger is also a member of the Organization for the Harmonization of Business Law in Africa (OHADA).

In December 2000, Niger qualified for enhanced debt relief under the International Monetary Fund program for Heavily Indebted Poor Countries (HIPC) and concluded an agreement with the Fund for Poverty Reduction and Growth Facility (PRGF). Debt relief provided under the enhanced HIPC initiative significantly reduces Niger's annual debt service obligations, freeing funds for expenditures on basic health care, primary education, HIV/AIDS prevention, rural infrastructure, and other programs geared at poverty reduction.

In December 2005, it was announced that Niger had received 100% multilateral debt relief from the IMF, which translates into the forgiveness of approximately US$86 million in debts to the IMF, excluding the remaining assistance under HIPC. Nearly half of the government's budget is derived from foreign donor resources. Future growth may be sustained by exploitation of oil, gold, coal, and other mineral resources. Uranium prices have recovered somewhat in the last few years. A drought and locust infestation in 2005 led to food shortages for as many as 2.5 million Nigeriens.

=== Agriculture ===
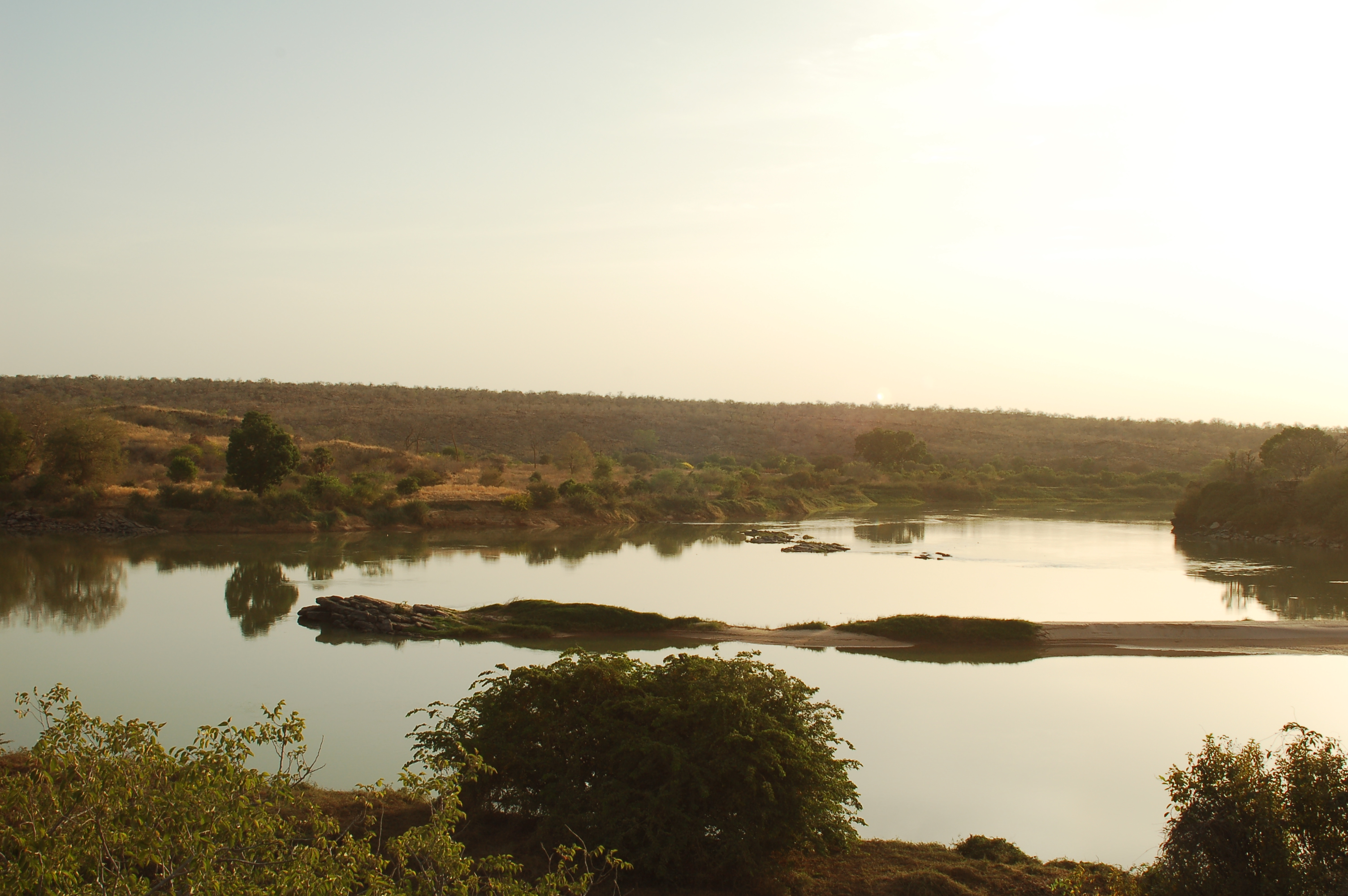
The fertile south of Niger near the Niger River.

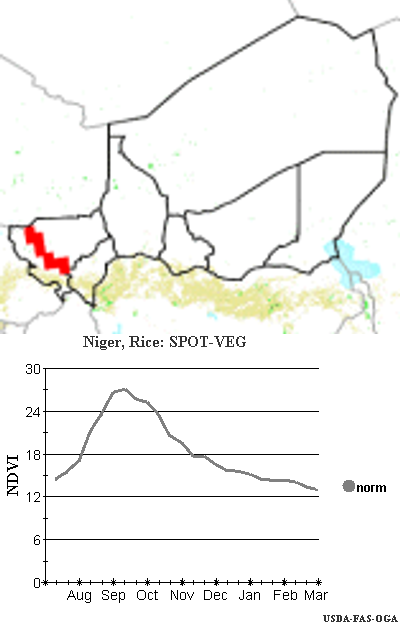
Map and growing season for the Nigerien Rice crop. Chart shows Normalized Difference Vegetation Index against Long Rains Dry Season (July – Feb), measuring normal years crop growth in the major Rice producing areas of Niger.

The agricultural economy is based largely upon internal markets, subsistence agriculture, and the export of raw commodities: foodstuffs and cattle to neighbors. Foreign exchange earnings from livestock, although difficult to quantify, are considered the second source of export revenue behind mining and oil exports. Actual exports far exceed official statistics, which often fail to detect large herds of animals informally crossing into Nigeria. Some hides and skins are exported, and some are transformed into handicrafts.

Niger's agricultural and livestock sectors are the mainstay of all but 18% of the population. 14% of Niger's GDP is generated by livestock production (camels, goats, sheep and cattle), said to support 29% of the population. Thus 53% of the population is actively involved in crop production. The 15% of Niger's land that is arable is found mainly along its southern border with Nigeria.

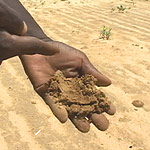
Drought has turned farmland into useless soil. A farmer examines the soil in drought-stricken Niger during the 2005 famine.

In these areas, Pearl millet, sorghum, and cassava are the principal rain-fed subsistence crops. Irrigated rice for internal consumption is grown in parts of the Niger River valley in the west. While expensive, it has, since the devaluation of the CFA franc, sold for below the price of imported rice, encouraging additional production. Cowpeas and onions are grown for commercial export, as are small quantities of garlic, peppers, potatoes, and wheat. Oasis farming in small patches of the north of the country produces onions, dates, and some market vegetables for export.

But for the most part, rural residents engaged in crop tending are clustered in the south centre and south west of the nation, in those areas (the Sahel) which can expect to receive between 300 and 600 mm (12 and 24 in) of rainfall annually. A small area in the southern tip of the nation, surrounding Gaya can expect to receive 700 to 900 mm (28 to 35 in) or rainfall. Northern areas which support crops, such as the southern portions of the Aïr Massif and the Kaouar oasis, rely upon oases and a slight increase in rainfall due to mountain effects. Large portions of the northwest and far east of the nation, while within the Sahara desert, see just enough seasonal rainfall to support semi-nomadic animal husbandry. The populations of these areas, mostly Tuareg, Wodaabe – Fula, and Toubou, travel south (a process called transhumance) to pasture and sell animals in the dry season, north into the Sahara in the brief rainy season.

Rainfall varies and when it is insufficient, Niger has difficulty feeding its population and must rely on grain purchases and food aid to meet food requirements. Rains, as in much of the Sahel, have been marked by annual variability. This has been especially true in the 20th century, with the most severe drought on record beginning in the late 1960s and lasting, with one break, well into the 1980s. The long-term effect of this, especially to pastoralist populations, remains in the 21st century, with those communities which rely upon cattle, sheep, and camels husbandry losing entire herds more than once during this period. Recent rains remain variable. For instance, the rains in 2000 were not good, while those in 2001 were plentiful and well distributed.

Soils that have become degraded, for example by intensive cereal production, cover 50 per cent of Niger's land. Laterite soils have a high clay content, which means they have higher Cation Exchange Capacity and water-holding capacity than sandy soils. If laterite soils become degraded, a hard crust can form on the surface, which hinders water infiltration and the emergence of seedlings. It is possible to rehabilitate such soils, using a system called the Bioreclamation of Degraded Lands.

This involves using indigenous water-harvesting methods (such as planting pits and trenches), applying animal and plant residues, and planting high-value fruit trees and indigenous vegetable crops that are tolerant of drought conditions. The International Crops Research Institute for the Semi-Arid Tropics (ICRISAT) has employed this system to rehabilitate degraded laterite soils in Niger and increase smallholder farmers' incomes. Trials have demonstrated that a 200 m^{2} (2,153 sq ft) plot can yield an income of around US$100, which is what men traditionally earn from millet production per hectare (10000m^{2}). As women are often given degraded soils, using this practice has helped to improve livelihoods for women in Niger.

The Kandadji Dam on the Niger River, whose construction started in August 2008, is expected to improve agricultural production in the Tillaberi Department by providing water for the irrigation of 6,000 hectares initially and of 45,000 hectares by 2034.

=== Drought and food crisis ===
As one of the Sahelian nations in West Africa, Niger has faced several droughts which led to food shortages and, in some cases, famines since its independence in 1963. This includes a series of droughts in the 1970s and 1980s and more recently in 2005–2006 and again in 2010. The existence of widespread famine in 2005–2006 was debated by the government of Niger as well some local NGOs.

=== Mining ===
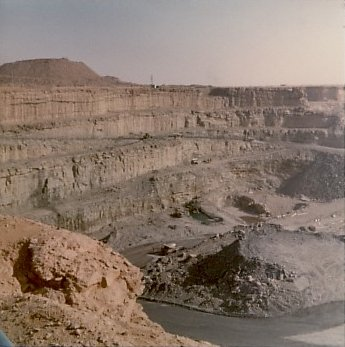
The open pit COMINAK uranium mine at Arlit.

The Niger mining industry is the main source of national exports, of which uranium is the largest export. Niger has been a uranium exporter since the 1960s and has had substantial export earnings and rapid economic growth during the 1960s and 1970s. The persistent uranium price slump has brought lower revenues for Niger's uranium sector, although it still provides 72% of national export proceeds. When the uranium-led boom ended in the early 1980s the economy stagnated, and new investment since then has been limited. Niger's two uranium mines—SOMAIR's open pit mine and COMINAK's underground mine—are owned by a French-led consortium and operated by French company Orano.

As of 2007, many licences have been sold to other companies from countries such as India, China, Canada and Australia in order to exploit new deposits. In 2013, the government of Niger sought to increase its uranium revenue by subjecting the two mining companies to a 2006 Mining Law. The government argued that the application of the new law will balance an otherwise unfavorable partnership between the government and Areva. The company resisted the application of the new law that it feared would jeopardize the financial health of the companies, citing declining market uranium prices and unfavorable market conditions. In 2014, following nearly a year long negotiation with the government of Niger, Areva agreed to the application of 2006 Mining Law of Niger, which would increase the government's uranium revenues from 5 to 12%. The 2023 coupe led by General Abdourahamanem Tiani caused major changes to the uranium industry and it's companies. In June 2025 Niger announced that it would be nationalizing the uranium industry as part of a wave of "anti french policies".

The persistent uranium price slump has brought lower revenues for Niger's uranium sector. Uranium no longer provides the majority of national export proceeds. The nation enjoyed substantial export earnings and rapid economic growth during the 1960s and 1970s after the opening of two large uranium mines near the northern town of Arlit. When the uranium-led boom ended in the early 1980s, however, the economy stagnated and new investment since then has been limited. Niger's two uranium mines (SOMAIR's open pit mine and COMINAK's underground mine) are owned by a French-led consortium and operated by French interests. Due to the 2023 military coup in Niger, a wave of new policies have been passed. In June 2025, Niger’s military government announced it would nationalize the SOMAÏR uranium mine, previously operated by the French state-linked nuclear company Orano. This move was framed as a strategic reclamation of resources after what Niger’s government claims was exploitation. The move to nationalize the SOMAÏR mine served as a symbolic break from French control and supports alignment with the other Sahel states who seek to follow similar policies of resource nationalism.

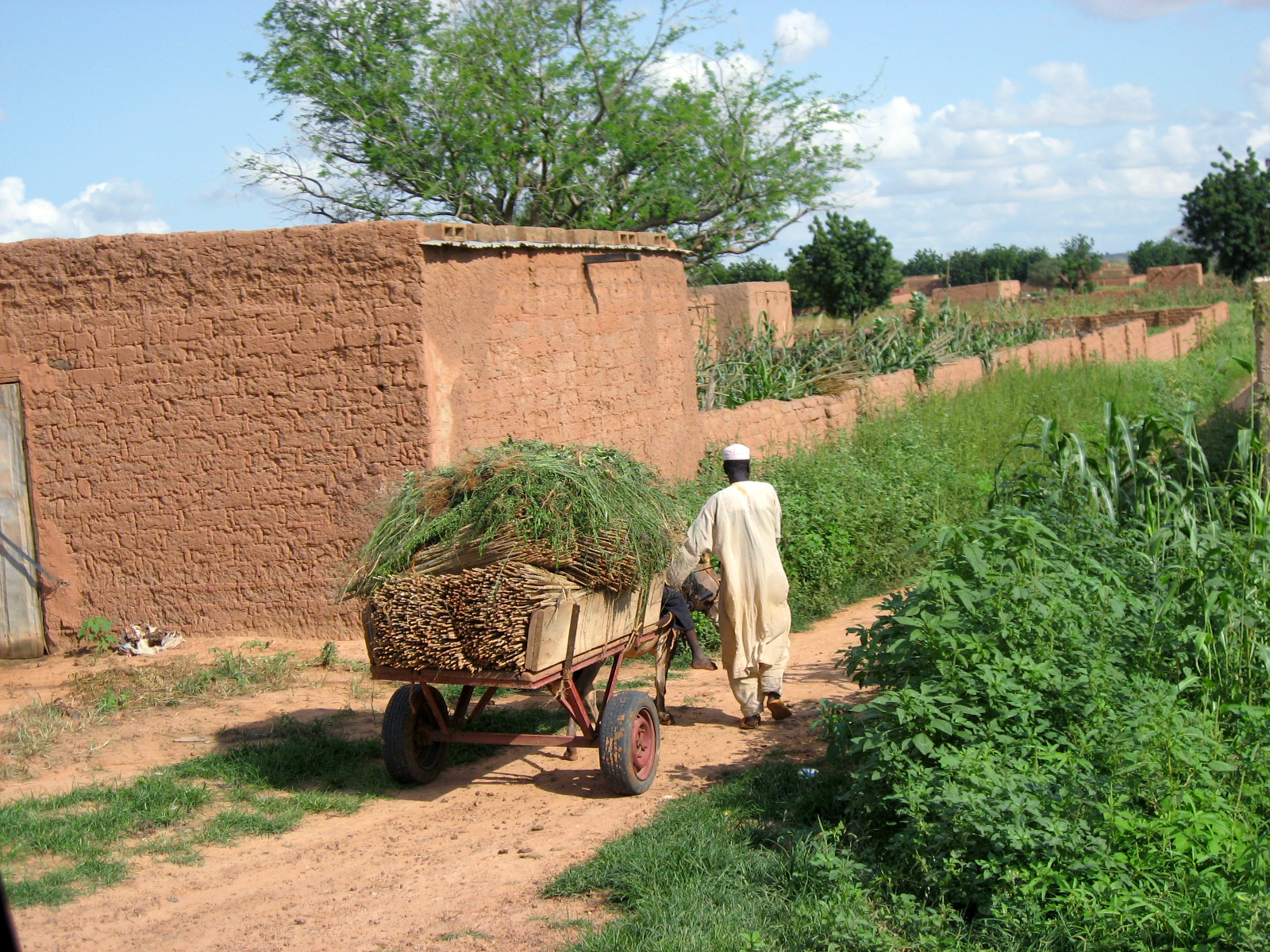
A farmer collecting millet in Koremairwa village in the Dosso department.

In addition to uranium, exploitable deposits of gold are known to exist in Niger in the region between the Niger River and the border with Burkina Faso. In 2004, the first Nigerien gold ingot was produced from the Samira Hill Gold Mine, in Tera Department. The Samira Hill Gold Mine thus became the first commercial gold production in the country. The reserves at the location were estimated at 10,073,626 tons at an average grade of 2.21 grams (0.078 oz) per ton from which 19,200 kilograms (42,300 lb) will be recovered over a six-year mine life. Other gold deposits are believed to be in nearby areas known as the "Samira Horizon", which is located between Gotheye and Ouallam.

Exploitable deposits of gold are known to exist in Niger in the region between the Niger River and the border with Burkina Faso. Substantial deposits of phosphates, coal, iron, limestone, and gypsum have also been found. Numerous foreign companies, including American firms, have taken out exploration licenses for concessions in the gold seam in western Niger, which also contains deposits of other minerals.

SONICHAR (Société Nigerienne de Charbon) in Tchirozerine (north of Agadez) extracts coal from an open pit and fuels an electricity generating plant that supplies energy to the uranium mines. Based on 2012 reports by the government of Niger, 246016 tons of coal were extracted by SONICHAR in 2011. There are additional coal deposits to the south and west that are of a higher quality and may be exploitable. Substantial deposits of phosphates, coal, iron, limestone, and gypsum have also been found in Niger.

Niger's known coal reserves, with low energy and high ash content, cannot compete against higher quality coal on the world market. However, the parastatal SONICHAR (Société nigérienne de charbon) in Tchirozerine (north of Agadez) extracts coal from an open pit and fuels an electricity generating plant that supplies energy to the uranium mines.

=== Oil ===
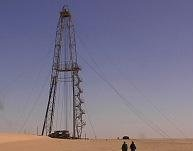
A test oil well in the Tenere Desert, January 2008

The history of oil prospecting and discovery goes back to the independence era with the first discovery of the Tintouma oil field in Madama in 1975. The Agadem basin in particular has attracted much attention since 1970 with Texaco and then Esso prospecting in the basin until 1980. Exploration permits on the same basin were held successively by Elf Aquitaine (1980–1985), Esso-Elf (1985–1998), Esso (1998–2002), and Esso-Petronas (2002–2006). While the reserves were estimated at 324 million barrels for oil and 10 billion m^{3} for gas, Esso-Petronas relinquished the permit because it deemed the quantities too small for production.

Several oil companies explored for petroleum since 1992 in the Djado plateau in north-eastern Niger and the Agadem basin, north of Lake Chad but made no discoveries worth developing at the time. In June 2007, however, China National Petroleum Corporation (state-owned by the People's Republic of China) signed a US$5 billion agreement to extract oil in the Agadem block, as well as build a 20,000 barrels (3,200 m^{3}) per day oil refinery and a 2,000 km oil pipeline in the country; production is expected to start in 2009.

With the sudden increase in oil price by 2008, this assessment was no longer true; consequently, the government transferred the Agadem block rights to CNPC. Niger announced that in exchange for the US$5 billion investment, the Chinese company would build wells, 11 of which would open by 2012, a 20,000-barrel-per-day (3,200 m^{3}/d) SORAZ refinery near Zinder, and a pipeline out of the nation. The government estimates the area has reserves of 324 million barrels (51,500,000 m^{3}), and is seeking further oil in the Tenere Desert and near Bilma. Niger began producing its first barrels of oil in 2011. Government revenue from this is over $100 million per year, about 5% of Niger's GDP, and slightly higher than from the uranium extraction industry.

== Infrastructure ==
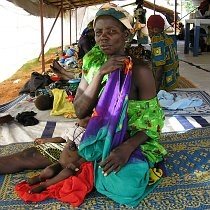
A rural mother tends to her malnourished infant at the Maradi MSF aid centre, during the 2005–2006 Niger food crisis. While the Maradi Region is the breadbasket of Niger, the 20th century saw three severe Sahel droughts which brought dramatic food insecurity to even the most fertile regions of Niger.

=== Transportation infrastructure ===
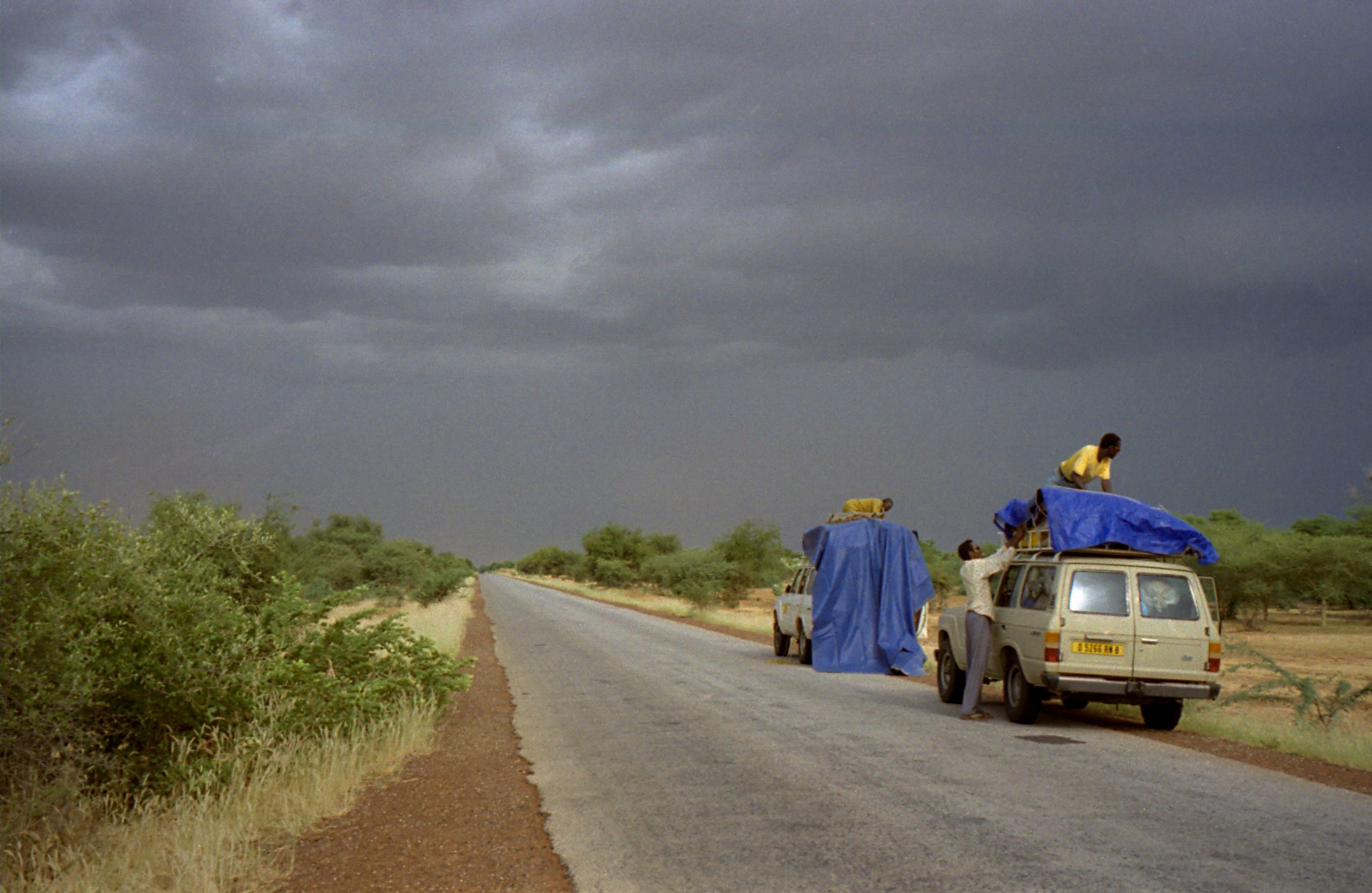
One of the roads leading to Tahoua, central Niger

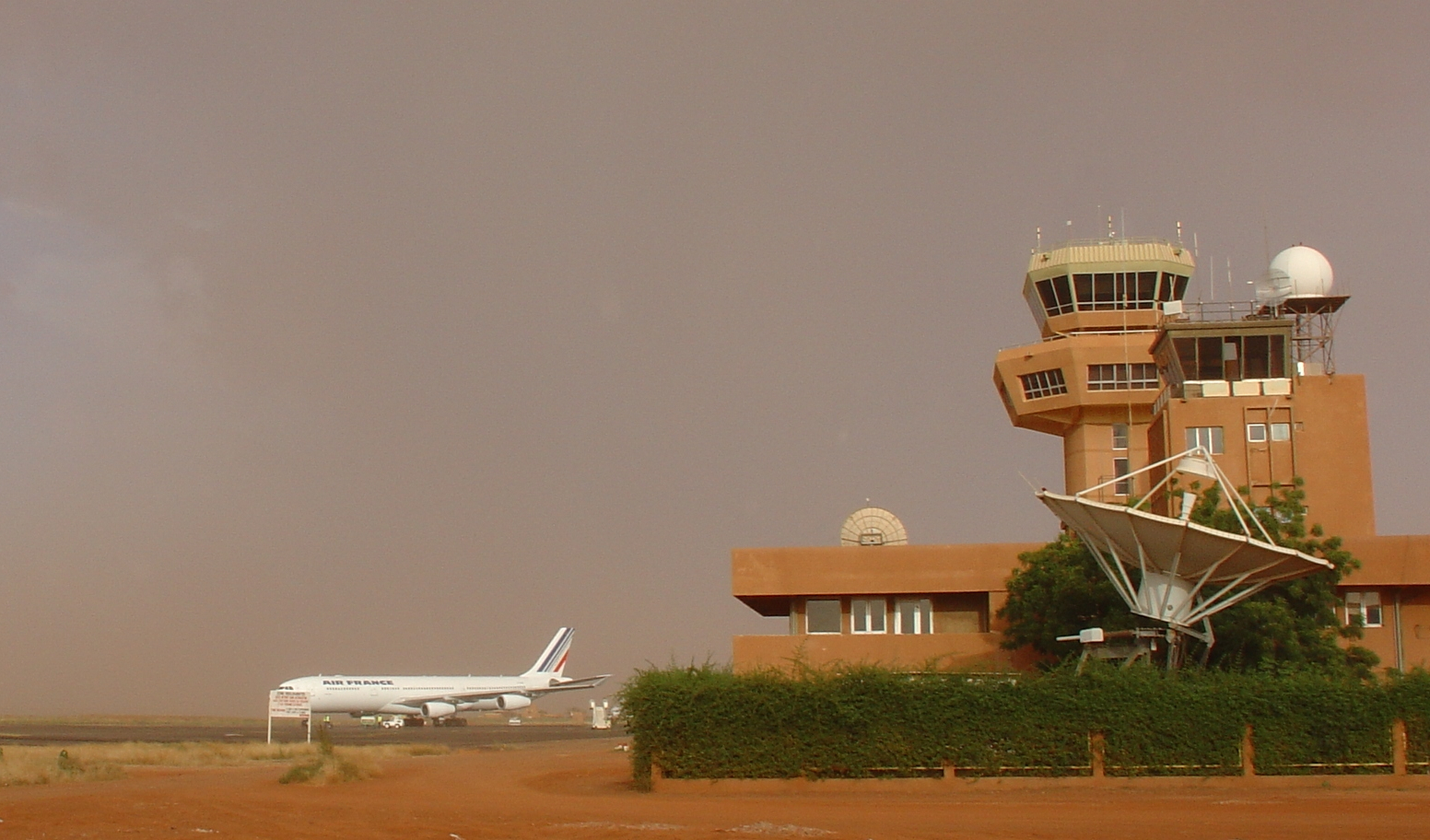
View of Diori Hamani International Airport at Niamey

Transport is crucial to the economy and culture of this vast landlocked nation, with cities separated by huge uninhabited deserts, mountain ranges, and other natural features. Niger's transport system was little developed during the colonial period (1899–1960), relying upon animal transport, human transport, and limited river transport in the far south west and south east. No railways were constructed in the colonial period. Construction of a network of paved roads linking major cities began after the independence reaching its heights during the uranium boom in the 1970s and 1980s. Primary or paved road systems are limited to bigger cities or connection between major cities. Road connections or networks in rural areas are mostly unpaved, all-weather laterite surfaces to grated dirt or sand plowed roads with various degrees of maintenance. In 2012, there was 19,675 kilometres (12,225 mi) of road network throughout Niger, of which 4,225 kilometres (2,625 mi) were paved.

The Niger River, which crosses the southwestern part of the country, is unsuitable for river transport of any large scale, as it lacks depth for most of the year, and is broken by rapids at many spots. Camel caravan transport was historically important in the Sahara desert and Sahel regions which cover most of the north.

Air transport is mainly concentrated in Niamey. Niger's only international airport is Diori Hamani International Airport, is located in the capital, Niamey. Other airports in Niger include the Mano Dayak International Airport in Agadez city and Zinder Airport in Zinder city but as of January 2015, they were not regularly serviced by any carriers.

In 2014, construction for the railway extension connecting Niamey (Niger) to Cotonou via Parakou (Benin) began and was expected to be completed by 2016. However, the project was still ongoing in 2018, and no recent reports have been made as of 2022. It includes the construction of 574 kilometres (357 mi) new railway from Niamey to connect to the existing line in Parakou (Benin). Besides Niamey, the railway line will go through Dosso city and Gaya.

=== Energy infrastructure ===
==== Accessibility to energy ====
Niger has insufficient access to the energy it needs. The country's energy consumption is considered one of the lowest in the world. Niger's existing systems of energy consumption are also very underdeveloped to sustain energy efficiency within the state. Electricity access between urban areas such as Niamey enable 50 percent electricity service, and rural areas with 20 to 40 percent electricity service, with the lowest region at 10 percent. Other demands for electricity are met by NIGELEC, providing diesel generators and thermal coal plants to create fuel for rent.

==== Primary energy outlets ====
Niger has three major energy consumption outlets; oil products, biofuel and waste, and electricity. As of 2016, Niger's energy consumption includes 486 ktoe via oil products, 2,217 ktoe via biofuel and waste, and 84 ktoe via electricity. Niger's predominant sources of energy are wood and charcoal, also known as biomass. Out of the 2,747 ktoe of energy supply in the country, 70% is from biomass. Households use up to 90% biomass due to the unavailability of alternative sources, and the increased rates of imported energy that some cannot afford. The most used oil products are liquefied petroleum gas, motor gasoline, gas and diesel, other kerosene, and fuel oil.

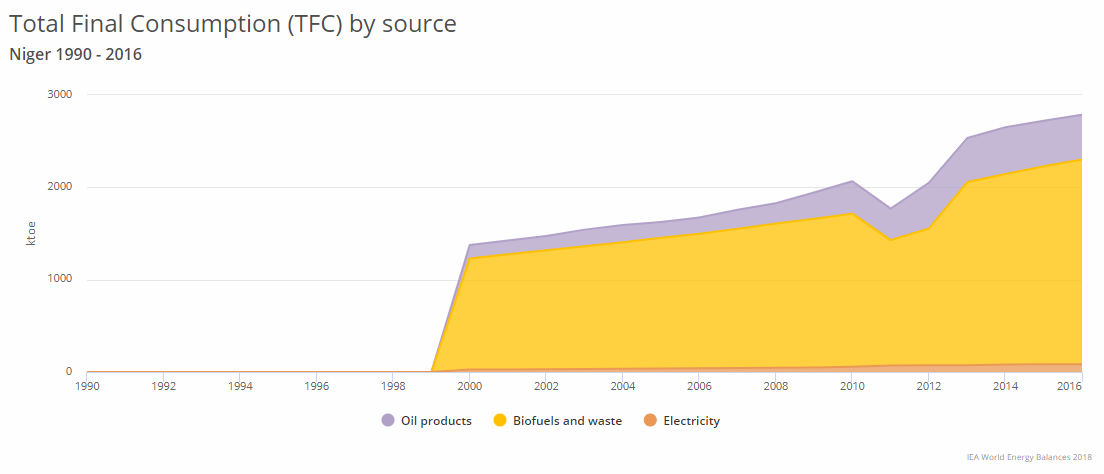
A chart representing the total final consumption of Niger's energy sources.

==== Sustainable and renewable energy ====
Niger also gets partial access to hydroelectric power from dams created alongside the Niger River. Hydroelectric power contributes about 280 megawatts (MW) to Niger's energy collectively from several hydropower sources, including 130 MW from the Kandadji, 122.5 from River Niger in Gambou, and 26 MW from Dyondyonga in Mekrou. Getting renewable energy via hydropower has proven controversial, due to the importance of rainfall in acquiring energy. Again, these hydroelectric power dams are creating energy for Niger via Nigeria.

Solar energy has also been used to provide energy access. From 2004 to 2010 solar power generation was implemented, but there was a significant drop from 2010 to 2012. However, since 2016 approximately 5 Gwh of solar power have been used.

Niger has the potential to provide sustainable and renewable energy access within the country, which would help increase its energy intake and cope with the growing demands of the population. Several projects have been discussed to make use of clean energy sources such as solar power, hydropower, grid power, and wind power.

Many NGOs are working on funding projects to provide sustainable and renewable energy in parts of Africa. Affording the resources to create sustainable energy is one of the biggest barrier Niger faces, but agencies such as International Renewable Energy Agency (IRENA) and AbuDhabi Fund for Development (ADFD) are funding low developing countries, including Niger, to help develop local renewable projects. Theses agencies will support projects including a hybrid micro-grid project employing solar PV and advanced lithium-ion batteries, a hydropower project, integrated wind and solar, and a combination project consisting of micro-grid and solar home kits. In addition, Lighting Africa, an NGO primarily working in Niger, is assisting in sustainable energy development through two World Bank-sponsored Energy Access Projects: the Niger Solar Electricity Project (NESAP), and the Regional Off-Grid Electrification Project (ROGEP). These projects will work with grid systems in two piloting countries, and this includes Niger. They will aim to increase electricity access in households, businesses, and communities through modern off-grid electrification.

== See also ==
- List of companies based in Niger
- List of countries by percentage of population living in poverty
- List of countries by Human Development Index
- List of countries by GDP (nominal)
- List of countries by GDP (nominal) per capita
- List of countries by GDP (PPP)
- List of countries by GDP (PPP) per capita
- List of countries by GNI (nominal) per capita
- List of countries by GDP growth
- List of countries by industrial production growth rate
- United Nations Economic Commission for Africa
