= Petroleum industry in Niger =

Niger has a long history of petroleum exploration dating back to the 1970s. However, it is only since 2011 with the opening of the Agadem oilfield and the Soraz refinery near Zinder that petroleum is being produced in Niger. The oil and gas extracted from the Agadem field are processed at the Soraz refinery. The refined products (gasoline, diesel and liquified natural gas) are primarily for domestic consumption. Since the beginning of oil extraction, it appears that the reserves have been underestimated: from an estimate of 324 million barrel reserves in 2008, it is believed that reserves are three times higher, near 1 billion barrels in 2013.

An export pipeline connecting Niger to the Atlantic Ocean through Benin is supposed to increase oil production from 20,000 barrels per day (refined at Soraz) to 110,000 barrels per day. The additional 90,000 barrels per day are destined for export.

== Exploration ==
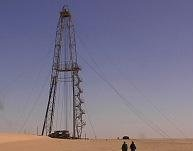
A test Oil well in the Ténéré desert in January 2008.

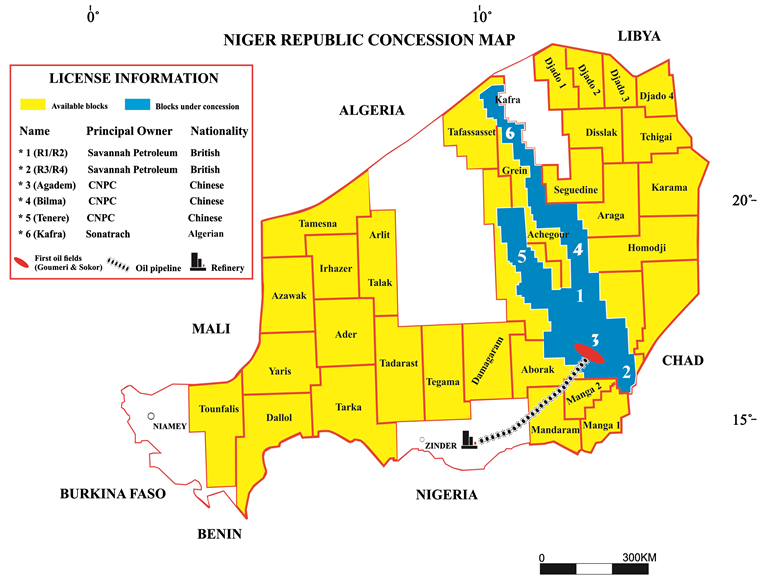
Map showing Niger oil and gas blocs and licenses information (2020)

The history of oil exploration and discovery in Niger goes back to the 1970s. The first tangible discovery occurred in 1975 at the Tintouma field near Madama. However, it was in the Agadem Basin, located in the north-east of the Niger, that exploration began in 1970 with first Texaco, then Esso prospecting until 1980. Ten wells will be drilled in Agadem block which covers an area of 27,516.2 square kilometres (10,624.1 mi^{2}).

In 1980, Elf Aquitaine held the permit on the Agadem block followed in 1985 by Esso and Elf, operating in a joint venture. Between 1990 and 1994, Esso and Elf dug five wells of which four resulted in discoveries. Esso dug three other wells between 1997 and 1998. Elf withdraw from the venture in 1998 and Esso was joined by Petronas in 2002.

After more than four years of exploration, Esso and Petronas abandoned the Agadem permit in 2006, judging it economically unprofitable. The block thus fell back in the public domain of the State with an estimated 324 million barrels of oil reserves and nearly 10,000,000,000 cubic metres (3.5×10^{11} ft^{3}) of gas. Unfortunately for the Esso and Petronas venture, oil prices increased starting in 2007 and going from $30 to $147 in 2008.

The reserves previously considered meager became more attractive and in 2008, China National Petroleum Corporation (CNPC) through its exploration and development company CNODC acquired the permit on the Agadem block. As part of the agreement with the government of Niger, CNODC created a national branch in Niger (CNPC-NIGER-PETROLEUM SA) and carried out further exploration. Between 2008 and 2012, 76 exploration wells were completed of which 62 have resulted in discoveries. This led to an increase of the previous estimates from 324 million to 744 million barrels of oil and 10,000,000,000 cubic metres (3.5×10^{11} ft^{3}) to 16,000,000,000 cubic metres (5.7×10^{11} ft^{3}) of natural gas reserves. In 2013, a second exploration permit was awarded to CNODC with the reserves now estimated as high as 1 billion barrels. Since 2012, exploration has intensified with production-sharing contracts signed with international firms from Nigeria, Australia, UK and Bermuda.

In addition to the Agadem block, the Tenere block, licensed to CNPC, has potential reserves near 1 to 3 billion barrels of resources.

CNPC holds the Agadem, Tenere and Bilma blocks. Sonatrach holds the Kafra block, while UK-based Savannah Energy holds two more blocks.

== Petroleum production ==
As of December 2023, CNPC is only company producing oil in Niger. Oil is extracted from the Agadem field and transported through an underground 426.5 kilometres (265.0 mi) long pipeline to the Soraz refinery near Zinder.

As of the first trimester of 2013, three million barrels had been extracted from the Agadem block.

Development of the oilfields at Agadem and an export pipeline connecting Niger to the Atlantic Ocean are supposed to increase production to 110,000 barrels per day.

== Petroleum refinery ==
The beginning of oil production in Niger in 2011 was accompanied by the construction of a refinery near Zinder(Société de raffinage de Zinder, commonly known as Soraz). The total petroleum refining capacity is 20,000 barrels per day. The excess is intended for exports to neighboring countries such as Benin, Burkina Faso and Mali. The refinery can produce up 69,900 tonnes per year of liquified natural gas, 306,200 tonnes per year of gasoline and 505,400 tonnes per year of gas oil. By the first semester of 2013, the refinery was producing 113,524 tonnes of gasoline, 217,222 tonnes of diesel and more than 20,000 tonnes of bottled liquified natural gas for domestic use per year.

In December 2023, de-facto president Abdourahamane Tiani announced that the country would aim to refine more oil locally.

== Petroleum exports ==
As of December 2023, the entirety of the extracted oil is sent to the refinery near Zinder for local production. Excess production is intended for export.

Plans for an export pipeline via Chad were shelved. It would have run for 193 kilometres (120 mi) from Agadem to Chad and another 400 kilometres (250 mi) in Chad to connect to the existing Chad-Cameroon pipeline.

Instead, a pipeline linking Niger and Benin was built. Niger aims to export 90,000 barrels per day via the export terminal off the coast of Benin. In April 2024, Prime Minister Ali Lamine Zeine entered into a 12-month agreement with CNPC, awarding the rights to the sale of the Nigerien state's share of the exported oil (25.4 percent).

== See also ==
- Economy of Niger
- Oil and mining industry of Niger
