= Arlit mine =

Uranium mine in Agadez Region, Niger

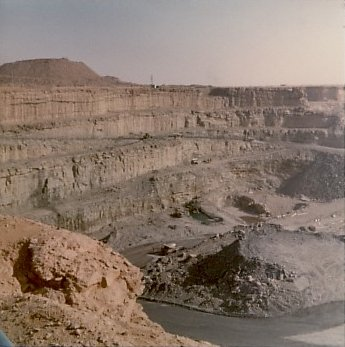

- Location within Niger

Location
- Location: Agadez Region, Niger; 18°46′23.16″N 7°20′39.48″E

Production
- Products: Uranium

The Arlit mine is a large mine located near Arlit, in the northern part of Niger in Agadez Region. Arlit represents one of the largest uranium reserves in Niger having estimated reserves of 47.5 million tonnes of ore grading 0.014% uranium.

Having been previously operated by its majority owner, the French nuclear energy firm Orano, the mine's operations were taken over by the Nigerien government on 4 December 2024.

In late 2025, French officials claimed that the ruling National Council for the Safeguard of the Homeland had signed a deal with Russian state corporation Rosatom to export hundreds of tons of yellowcake to Russia. By the end of November 2025, Orano stated that it believed that a large convoy carrying the shipment had left the mine. The convoy was later observed to have arrived at the Diori Hamani International Airport in Niamey by mid-December. The convoy sparked significant controversy in France, with Orana accusing the Nigerien junta of theft, concerns over the safety of the transport process, and French press dubbing it the "Mad Max Uranium Express."
