= Plaque Point attack =

Date	April 9, 2023
Location	Plaque Point, between Tagharaba and Arlit, Agadez Region, Niger
Result	Attackers' victory

Belligerents
Niger	Unknown attackers: Chadians suspected

Casualties and losses
5 killed 5 injured 2 missing	3 arrested

On April 9, 2023, jihadists attacked a convoy of Nigerien soldiers returning from the Tabarkat gold mine along the Tagharaba-Arlit road near an area called Plaque Point. Five soldiers were killed in the attack. The perpetrators of the attack are unknown.

== Background ==
Jihadist groups like the Islamic State – Sahel Province (ISGS) and Jama'at Nasr al-Islam wal-Muslimin (JNIM) are both active in Niger and have been known to attack gold mines and gold convoys to finance their jihadi operations. However, these groups had a very scant presence in Agadez Region at the time of the attack, being more active in Tahoua Region and Tillabéri Region.

== Attack ==
A survivor of the attack said that they were returning from the Tabarkat gold mine when the gunmen infiltrated their convoy, opening fire on the Nigerien Defense and Security Forces (FDS) soldiers. The soldiers chased after the assailants, but ended up falling into another ambush. Five soldiers were injured in the attack, five were killed, and two were missing as of April 13.

On April 10, the day following the attack, voice messages on WhatsApp circulated alleging that the raid's perpetrators had been released by Nigerien courts. The court in Arlit denied this. Three suspects were later arrested between Tchibarakaten and Arlit, with the Arlit government saying that raids like this usually occur on rural roads. Chadian emigres in Arlit were blamed for the attack, which was denied by a spokesman for the Chadian community.
