= Akokan, Niger =

Akokan
- Location in Niger
- Coordinates: 18°42′39″N 7°20′37″E
- Country: Niger
- Department: Arlit Department

Akokan is a mining town in the Arlit Department of the Agadez Region of northern-central Niger. It is located about 5 kilometres (3.1 mi) southwest of Arlit in the Sahara Desert, and roughly 250 kilometres (160 mi) north of Agadez. It is considered to be Niger's "second uranium town". SOMAIR and COMINAK (Compagnie minière d'Akokan), run by Areva and the Nigerien state, operate uranium mines in the vicinity of the towns of Akokan and Arlit. In the maps of the area, Akokan is classified under "Mine - Agadez-Niger". The Tuareg and Toubou people are local to the area.

== History ==
The Akokan deposit was initially prospected by a France-Japan-Niger tripartite affiliation in the early 1970s. In 1975, underground mining at Akokan was estimated to require over $100 million in investment. Today over 100,000 people live in Akokan and Arlit. Greenpeace has expressed concerns over the high radiation levels found on the streets of Akokan. Afasto, south of Akokan, was the site of newly discovered uranium reserves in 2001.

The operational base of COMINAK mining company was established at Akokan, Niger, near Arlit and a new mining town ship was built to house its offices and employees. The number of employees reported to be working for COMINAK is 1,150. Health and essential social services are part of the commitment by COMINAK to help and to improve living conditions for its employees and the local community. Akokan is Niger's "second uranium town" operated by SOMAIR and COMINAK (Compagnie minière d'Akokan).

== Infrastructure ==
The infrastructure facilities created in the town covers two field hospitals, network of well laid out roads (more than 800 kilometres (500 mi)) from Tahoua, electric power supply from the 16 MW captive coal based power station near Tchirozorine and transmitting power over a transmission line of 200 kilometres (120 mi) (40 kilometres (25 mi) to the north of Agadez), an airport and hotels for visitors.

Akokan includes a mix of upscale living quarters and a shantytown, as well as hotels, a cultural hall and sports centers.

== Environmental concerns ==
In both the towns of Akokan and Arlit, and also close to the mines, the tailings from the processed ores are reported to possess radioactive elements which have been harmful to the health of the people; its consequences are reported to have led to premature deaths of people including the employees. The matter has been a subject of serious debate and discussions between the Environmental Activists and the AREVA (the owner of the mining operations). Open cut and underground mines of Comac and Sumair, under operation for several decades of operations since the 1970s, of both the amount of tailings heaped up (totally unprotected to prevent health hazards) in the two towns has generated about 30million tons tailing and these are reported to be radioactive. Since 2007, following the protests, several remedial actions have been initiated by Medecins du Monde and Areva; a French lawyers' association is monitoring these management actions related to health and labour safety measures. The AREVA has averred with assurances that the “after effects of the mines” shall be addressed through “Sustainable Development Philosophy;".

== Fossiliferous site ==
An armored, terrestrial, herbivorous reptile, Bunostegos akokanensis (“the lump-headed reptile of Akokan") was discovered near Akokan and named in honor of the locale.
