= Imouraren mine =

Uranium mine in Niger

- Location within Niger
- Location: Agadez Region, Niger; 18°05′26″N 7°26′27″E
- Products: Uranium

The Imouraren mine is a large mine located in the northern part of Niger in Agadez Region, about 80 km (50 mi) south of Arlit. Imouraren represents one of the largest uranium reserves in Niger having estimated reserves of 109.1 million tonnes of ore grading 0.06% uranium. It is the site of a uranium mining project involving French company Areva and SOPaMin (Société du Patrimoine des Mines du Niger on behalf of the government of Niger). The U_{3}O_{8} ore grade at nearby SOMAIR is 14,000 tons at 0.3%, COMINAK is 29,000 t at 0.4% and Imouraren 120,000t at 0.15%.

In 2009 an operating permit was issued and excavations began in 2012. However the project was suspended in 2015 due to low uranium prices in the wake of the Fukushima nuclear disaster.

In early 2023, French nuclear fuel cycle company Orano started exploring the option of opening the mine using the in-situ recovery (ISR) method of extraction, which uses a leaching solution pumped through boreholes drilled into the deposit. There are concerns this and other mines are a danger to the area's water supply.
