= Orano Cycle =

French nuclear company

- Type: Public
- Industry: Nuclear
- Founded: 1976
- Headquarters: Paris, France
- Area served: France
- Key people: Jean-Jacques Dreher (CEO)
- Website: orano.group

Orano Cycle, formerly COGEMA (Compagnie générale des matières nucléaires) and Areva NC, is a French nuclear fuel company. It is the main subsidiary of Orano S.A. It is an industrial group active in all stages of the uranium fuel cycle, including uranium mining, conversion, enrichment, spent fuel reprocessing, and recycling.

The company was originally created in 1976. In 2001, it became part of Areva; its name was changed to Areva NC in March 2006. As a result of restructuring of Areva, Areva NC became part of Orano and changed its name to Orano Cycle.

== History ==
In 1976, Compagnie générale des mines was created based on the uranium production activities of Commissariat à l'énergie atomique (CEA). Later it was renamed Compagnie Générale des Matières Nucléaire (COGEMA). As of 1999, COGEMA was majority owned by CEA (81.5%) with minority owned by Total S.A. (15%) and Technip (3.5%). It also owned stakes in Framatome and Eramet.

In June 2001, Cogema became a part of the Topco group which was renamed Areva in September 2001. In 2006, Cogema became Areva NC and began the construction of a new uranium enrichment plant at the Tricastin nuclear site. In 2008, Areva NC launched the Comurhex II projects for new uranium conversion plants at Malvési and [Tricastin sites in France.

In 2018, Areva NC changed its name to Orano Cycle to reflect the restructuring of Areva.

== Operations ==
Areva NC is based in France and with its subsidiaries has a presence in more than 30 countries. It employs approximately 19,000 people worldwide. In France, it operates the reprocessing plant at La Hague, the Marcoule nuclear site, the Pierrelatte nuclear site (Tricastin nuclear site) and the Cadarache center.

Orano Cycle has uranium reserves in Niger, Canada, Australia and Kazakhstan. The last mine operation in France, La Société des Mines de Jouac, closed in 2001 when its reserves ran out.

=== Niger ===
==== Concessions ====
Areva NC's Niger operations consist of three concessions near the town of Arlit, runs as joint ventures with (minority) stakeholders from the Nigerien government and smaller foreign investors. Arlit was in fact built in the midst of the Sahara to support these operations, and has a large expatriate population employed by Areva and its subcontractors. These ventures are Somair (Société des Mines de l'Aïr) which operates an open pit uranium mine, and COMINAK (Compagnie Minière d'Akouta). These two mines accounted for 3,093 metric tonnes of uranium in 2005, almost 10 percent of annual global production and 30% of French consumption and 32% of Niger's exports, but less than 5% of Niger's GDP. The increase in the cost of uranium on world markets in 2006 (more than 46%) will enable Niger to triple its revenues sourced from Areva.

==== 2007 conflict with Niger ====
On 25 July 2007, the CEO of Areva-Niger, Dominique Pin, was expelled from Niger (although he was in Paris at the time) on charges of supporting the Second Tuareg Rebellion. According to Le Canard enchaîné, this move from Seyni Oumarou's government was motivated by negotiations concerning the uranium trade agreement, which was finally renewed on 1 August 2007. Furthermore, Laouel Kader Mahamadou, who had resigned from his functions as secretary general of the Nigerien government to take a consulting job with Areva-Niger, was asked by the Nigerian DGSE to remain in Niger instead of flying to France for an integration workshop until a "clarification of the situation" could be obtained.

The sporadic fighting in the uranium-producing north halted Areva's Niger mining operations in late 2007, and expansion plans were only beginning to resume in February 2008, while the insecurity and uncertainty remained.

Prior to this, Areva also gained a concession in nearby Imouraren, which is hoped to double or triple their production in Niger. In January 2008, Areva signed a deal to invest over 1 billion euros into its three operations in Niger, increasing the share of revenues going to the government of Niger by 50 percent. Areva is also being pressured by the opening for the first time of over 100 concessions for uranium mining in Niger, most notably to Canadian and Chinese firms.

In July 2008, four French workers were kidnapped from Areva operations near Arlit, but quickly released. Nigerien rebels of the Movement Nigerien for Justice (MNJ) operations in early and mid-2008 affected transport of ore from Arlit. Despite the violence in the Aïr Massif, Areva NC and the Nigerien government were by later 2008 unhindered in their exploitation of the Arlit uranium mines and in the transport of its product by highway to ports in Benin.

==== Imouraren mine ====
At the beginning of 2009, Niger and the French state mining company agreed a deal to build near Arlit the Imouraren mine. Areva would hold a 66% stake to the Nigerien mining office's 33%. At a projected output of five thousand tonnes of ore a year, it would be largest uranium mine in the world by 2012, as the SOMAIR and COMINAK mines are phased out. The deal would make Niger the second largest uranium producer in the world, and included plans to construct a civil nuclear power station for Niger. While Areva officials earlier in the year admitted the security situation makes it impossible to prospect at night, the operations of the mines were by December unaffected by the Tuareg rebellion. Despite the 2007 awarding of nearly 100 prospecting contracts to firms other than Areva, the high-profile Chinese and Canadian projects were in 2009 not yet formalised.

==== Long term relations ====
Areva has been criticised both in Niger and the west for a neocolonial relationship with the former French colony, having obtained monopoly rights to mine uranium for nearly forty years, while Niger remains (as of 2006) the least developed country in the world. There has been speculation that Areva was the primary vehicle (and motivation) for French government involvement in the Nigerien government's poor history of democracy and human rights since the late 1960s.

Areva argues that it is a good steward of the environment and a partner in development with the Nigerien people. The company stresses that most workers it directly employs in Niger are locals, and that the revenue generated by these mines is the single largest foreign exchange source for Niger. When the population of Niger was exposed to a serious famine in 2005, Areva donated 130,000 euros in June 2005 to the food crisis coordination group of Niger, and 120,000 euros in July in the form of two planes loaded with food and organized by Bernard Kouchner's Réussir NGO. Nigerien critics point out that this aid amounted to 0.05% of Areva's annual profits of 428 million euros.

In January 2008, a Swiss human rights group awarded Areva's Niger operations their "2008 Public Eye Global Award" for the "worst company in the world", citing charges of radioactive pollution, poor working conditions, and the deaths of a number of workers. The Tuareg based rebel group fighting in the Arlit area has echoed these charges.

=== France ===
==== Cezus ====
Cezus or CEZUS is a subsidiary of Areva NC. It is the company's front-end operation for zirconium. It supplies the company's Reactors and Services operational unit with the materials needed for the nuclear industry. It produces "zirconium alloy tubes, bars, and sheets for pressurized water reactors and boiling water reactors". It forms Areva's Fuel Zirconium Division with the ANF plant in Duisburg, Germany. It operates five sites in France. The commune of Ugine says Cezus is the worldwide number one in zirconium.

===== Jarrie =====
Isère. Plant manufactures zirconium sponge through chemical operations and extractible metallurgical processes. It also values derived products issued from the zirconium process such as hafnium salt, magnesium and silicium, as well as zirconium and hafnium oxides and highly pure hafnium.

===== Montreuil-Juigné =====
Maine-et-Loire. Plant transforms extruded billets into an extruded tube, the trex.

===== Painboeuf =====
Loire-Atlantique. This and Duisburg plants pilder mills the Trex as a fuel rod (claddings and guide tubes). Paimboeuf plant also makes zirconium bars for end caps.

===== Rugles =====
Eure. Plant rolls (hot and cold) the slab to coils and strips for the structure of the fuel assembly.

===== Ugine =====
- Cezus' primary research and development center, named CRC, is in Ugine, Savoie. Also a service center, it employs 25 engineers and technicians in zirconium-based alloys metallurgy and processes. It has partnerships with the French National Centre for Scientific Research (CNRS) and universities. It conducts research and development of new alloys for fuel assemblies. It develops software for fabrication of zirconium sponge, shaping of zirconium alloys, and conversion processes.
- Plant established in 1971 with a workforce of 360. Metalworking (melting, forging) and transformation of reactive metals such as zirconium, hafnium, titanium for critical nuclear and aeronautical applications. Plant turns zirconium sponge into an alloy semifinished product. Main operations: melt, forge, extrude and recycle. Outputs extruded billets, slabs and bars.

Subsidiary: Société Timet Savoie (titanium).

It is the site where Sylvain Mollier, one of the Annecy shootings victims, worked when he died.
"Il travaillait dans un atelier de production chez Cezus, une usine du groupe nucléaire français Areva [...]."

== See also ==
- Eurodif program
- Marcoule, a site shared by Areva NC and the Commissariat à l'Energie Atomique (CEA) nuclear organization.
- Nuclear power in France
