= Arlit Airport =

- IATA: RLT; ICAO: DRZL

Summary
- Airport type: Public
- Owner: Government
- Location: Arlit, Niger
- Elevation AMSL: 1,443 ft / 440 m
- Coordinates: 18°47′20″N 7°21′36″E

Map
- Location within Niger

Runways
Direction	Length		Surface
Direction	ft	m	Surface
10/28	6,550	1,996	Dirt
- Source: Google Maps

Arlit Airport (IATA: RLT, ICAO: DRZL) is an airport serving Arlit in the Agadez Region of northern-central Niger.
