= COMINAK =

National uranium mining company of Niger

COMINAK (Compagnie minière d'Akokan) is a national uranium mining company of Niger.

It is a joint venture between the French company Areva NC and the state of Niger, which operates in the field of mining. COMINAK was established in 1974, following a memorandum of understanding between France, Japan and Niger. They commenced uranium production in 1978, and reached a record production in 1981 with 2,260 tons of uranium. COMINAK's plant is installed in Akokan, not far from the town of Arlit.

COMINAK is one of two national mining companies in Niger, the other being SOMAIR in the nearby Arlit.

As of 2011, the U_{3}O_{8} ore grade reserves at Somaïr were 14,000 tons at 0.3%, Cominak is 29,000 t at 0.4% and Imouraren 120,000t at 0.15%.

== History ==
The earliest reported exploration for uranium started in 1956 was initially by the French Atomic Energy Commission (CEA) which was continued by COGEMA. This was followed by extraction of the mines at Akouta and Akola by COMINAK. In 1970, France-Japan-Niger research signed an agreement on the scope of exploitation of Akouta underground mines. COMINAK then became the second in the line of firms established to mine and process uranium in Niger. The consortium was founded in 1971, but it is in business of uranium mining in Niger after establishing its plant in 1978, and since then has progressively expanded its interest over the years. Its active mines in Nigeria are the underground mines which are claimed as the largest underground mines in the world. However, in 1975 the leasing or transfer of mining rights of Akouta's area to COMINAK was concluded by COGEMA. In 1981 COMANAC mines achieved the maximum production rate 2,260 metric tons per year; however, in 1986 the production rate per year was restricted to 1,960 metric tons. Akola area was leased to COMINAK for extraction, in 1987.

In 1998, uranate, the processed uranium of 40 million tons was packed under containers, which was followed by signing of a new mining agreement in 2001 for the period 2004–2013. Feasibility study for the Afasto site was initiated and the extraction of the mines was started during 2007. ISO 14001 certification on sustainable development and environmental protection was given in 2003, renewed in 2006 and 2008. A rectification and development plan was also launched for the period 2006–08. During 2006 the Agebout and Afouday areas were also taken up for exploration studies. COMINAK was granted a mining permit in 2006 to operate in the southern part of the Ebba deposit. The Imourarean ore area, located 80 km to the south of Arlit, which was first discovered in 1969, was also explored in 2006 considering the favorable market condition for uranium in the world. Mining at this large mine was started in 2011. It is now the second largest active uranium mine in the African continent. The reserves were expected to last for another 15 years as of 2010 at the extraction rate of 1,433 metric tons of concentrate. The Akouta region, where uranium concessions are operational since 1978, is 10 kilometres (6.2 mi) west of Arlit; the mines were discovered in 1966-67 by the French Atomic Energy Commission (CEA). When established the programme was to have a production rate of 2000 tons of processed ore by 1980. The second company to be established to mine and process uranium in Niger, its plant became operational in 1978.

== Operations ==
SOMAIR and COMINAK are both subsidiaries of AREVA. Established as a joint consortium, the shares of each partner is well defined with Cogema of France holding 34%, followed by Onarama of Niger 31%, Oud of Japan holding 25% and the balance 10% with ENUSA (Empresa Nacional del Uranio) of Spain. Mutually, the two firms have continued to have cordial relations with conventions established with the Nigerian authorities. With Niger ranked third in the world in production of uranium, the COMINAK, along with its sister concern Somair, have become substantial uranium producers. From the time the mining began in 1971, the two firms have fully adhered and honoured all agreements with the Government of Niger. COMINAK has ISO 14001 and OHSAS 18001 certification continues to have (as of 2011) on the basis of establishing the demanded and essential environmental, health and safety management systems.in the mining area. COMINAK is under a legal frame work with Niger, which is binding till 2103.

The operational base of the company was established at Akokan, Niger, near Airlit and a new mining town ship was built to house its offices and employees. The number of employees reported to be working for COMINAK is 1,150. Health and essential social services are part of the commitment by COMINAK to help and to improve living conditions for its employees and the local community. COMINAK developed a workers training center, still active as of 2007. Consequent to protests by the environmentalist lobby in Nigeria over the high rate of uranium emissions. In the area, the company has instituted many social services and sought certification by the ISO.

== Production ==
The COMINAK's Akouta underground mine's entrance has two declines (with 20% slope), one to provide circulation to engines and the other for the conveyor belt for the ores. The mines have a maze of tunnels extending over 250 kilometres (160 mi) of combined length and reaching depths of 250 metres (820 ft). The stopes for extraction run up to 250 metres (820 ft). The Akota mill facility is located next to the mine, which has a sulphuric acid plant for processing, using imported sulphur. The mine produced 1,606 tonnes of uranium metal in 2010, cumulative production of about 61 500 tonnes since 1974. Approximately 1200 people are employed by the COMINAK. A very productive time, the field is experiencing a significant decline over the past twenty years. Aakouta underground mine has contributed richly to uranium production in Niger., and these ore formations are considered the richest grade in Africa (second only to that of Canada) COGEMA has nearly a 66% share of uranium concentrates. The ore assets remaining in the mines are assessed to last for many decades.

== Geology ==
The geological formations of the continental lower Carboniferous sandstones have the uranium ore in association with quartz and feldspar which also have intrusions of clay and organic matter; Pitchblende is also part of this formation. Concentration of Uranium is of the order of 4000 ppm. Specifically, the COMINAK mines are part of the geological formations of Guezouman conglomeratic (conjectured as of Viséan age, a stage in the stratigraphic column) and in the Tarat sandstones of Namurain age, a stage in the regional stratigraphy. The Imourean deposits have been identified in the Tchirezrine sandstone of Jurassic age, a geologic period and system. In simple terms, uranium ores are found in sandstone deposits. An oxidative dissolution using sulphuric acid is the process that is used for extraction of uranium. Inference from the laboratory investigations of many samples of the tailings of the processed ore indicate that the main source of UVI could be from the ore-inherited uraninites influenced by oxidation and solubilization. Uranium ore is mined at Akouta, Akola and Afasto nearby. It is the largest underground uranium mine in the world. The uranium content is 0.4%. The ore is processed to produce magnesium uranate (the "Yellow Cake", which contains about 75% uranium). The yield from their mines is reported as 4 kg of Uranium for every metric ton of ore extracted.

== See also ==
- Oil and mining industry of Niger
- List of countries by uranium production
- List of countries by uranium reserves
