= SOMAIR =

Mining company of Niger

- Location: Arlit, Agadez Region, Niger
- Products: uranium
- Opened: 1971
- Company: AREVA (63.4%), Government of Niger (36.6%)
- Acquired: 1969

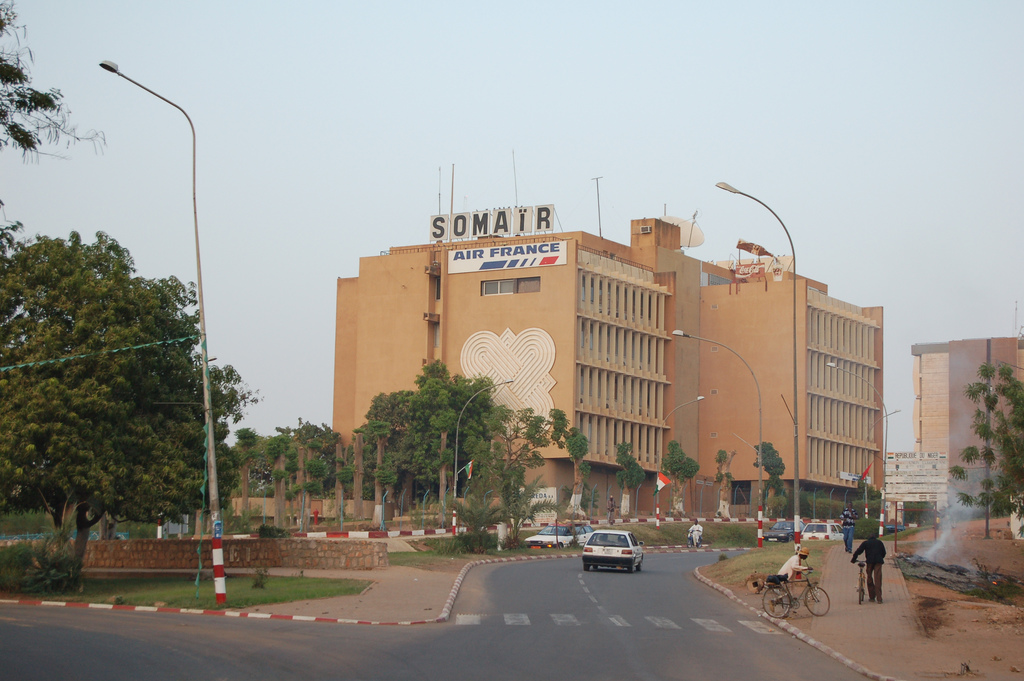
SOMAIR's headquarters building in Niamey, Niger

SOMAIR (Société des Mines de l'Air) is a national mining company of Niger in the mining area of its northern zone. Established in 1968, it started uranium mining at the Arlit deposit in 1971, mining 0.30–0.35% ore down to depth of 60 metres (200 ft) depth. By 1981, the company was producing 2100 tU/yr and by 2006 it was producing 1565 tU at the Tamou deposit. The production peaked to 3065 tU in 2012. The resources, according to the Red Book, are assessed at 23,170 tU, as of 2010, at 42,200 tU of 0.25%U grade recoverable conventionally, and 5500 tU of 0.07%U grade from heap leaching. SOMAIR is one of two national mining companies in Niger, the other being COMINAK in the nearby Akokan.

== Geography ==
Arlit and Akokan are the twin mining towns of SOMAIR. They are situated on the southern border of the Sahara Desert, where uranium is extracted, and are on the western fringe of the Aïr Mountains. They are located 1,200 kilometres (750 mi) to the north-east of Niamey, the capital of Niger.

== History ==
The discovery of uranium in Niger dates to 1967. It was discovered at Azelik by the French Bureau de Recherches Géologiques et Minières (BRGM). Studies of its potential and quality were commenced by the French Atomic Energy Commission (CEA). Uranium deposits were also discovered in sandstone formations in other locations in Niger such as Abokurum (1959), Madaouela (1963), Arlette, Ariege, Artois and Tassa/Taza (1965), Imouraren (1966) and Akouta (1967). In 1971, SOMAIR became the first company to operate the Arlit mine. Yet another company, the Société Minière de Tassa N'Taghalgue (SMTT) assigned its mining rights in 1996 to SOMAIR before it dissolved.

In May 2023, the Niger government and Orano, the restructured successor to Areva, signed an agreement to extend the operational life of the mine by 11 years to 2040.

After the 2023 Nigerien coup d'état, in December 2024, Orano announced that it had "lost operational control" of its mining subsidiary Somaïr in Niger.

In June 2025, the State of Niger decided, during a Council of Ministers meeting, "to nationalize the Société des mines de l'Aïr. According to the Nigerien government, the shares and assets of Somaïr are fully transferred to the State of Niger". In September 2025, following action by Orano to defend its interests, the International Centre for Settlement of Investment Disputes ordered Niger not to sell or transfer uranium from Arlit.

== Operations ==
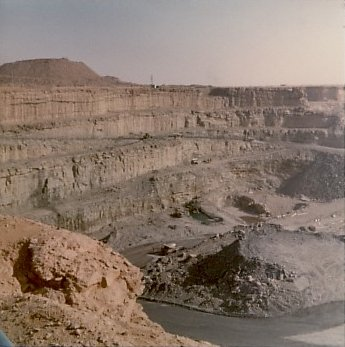
Arlit mine under SOMAIR in Niger

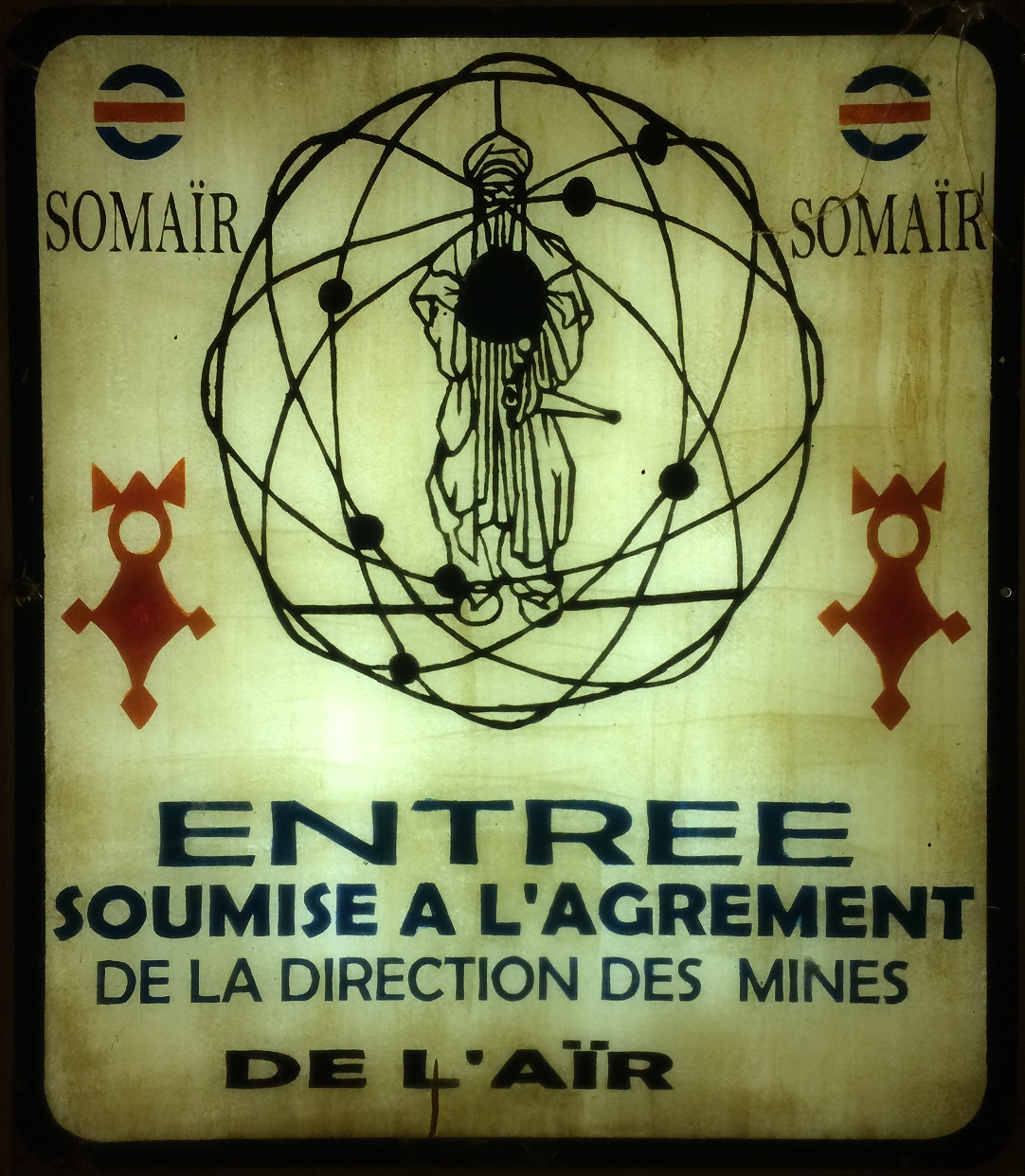
Sign for the mine restaurant

SOMAIR, like COMINAK, is a subsidiary of Areva. The company's two shareholders are Cogema (now Areva NC) and ONAREM (Office National des Ressources Minieres du Niger). The mine operations conform to the ISO 14001 certification.

== Production ==
The extraction process was started during the late 1970s and early 1980s and involved the building of exclusive leach pad processing operations of the extracted uranium ores, apart from open cut mining. Initially, the Artois deposits were extracted by open cut mining up to 60 metres (200 ft) depth with a production rate of 0.30 - 0.35% ore. Lower grade uranium is exploited up to deeper depths of 90 metres (300 ft), but with lower ore extraction rate of 0.20 - 0.25%.

During 2005–06, new leach pads were constructed over the old ones. The new leach pad is capable of handling 17 million tonnes of uranium ore which could yield 1.4 million tonnes of uranium extract per year. For the new leach pad, called a heap leach pad, associated with processing ponds, the design adopted at the SOMAR mining site is 30 metres (98 ft) in height. It is built up with 5 layers of 6 metres (20 ft) lift each. The leach pad and the pond are built over a layer of 300 millimetres (12 in) thick, clay of low permeability. High-density polyethylene (HDPE) of 2 millimetres (0.079 in) thickness is laid over the clay layer. The optimized design adopted envisages minimizing the cut-and-fill earthworks and also ensure pad-drainage slopes to enable gravity drainage "through a solution channel to the ponds". The drainage pipes are perforated and are installed in a "herringbone pattern", in each cell. The collection of drainage water from each cell is achieved by linking them to a collector drainpipe which carries the drained water into the processing ponds. The piping system was fully camouflaged with fill of ore material.

According to the Red Book, the resource potential of the ore was 42,200 tU as of 2010; this includes conventional recovery of 42,200 tU of 0.25%U, and by heap leaching another 5500 tU at 0.07%U. The production of the SOMAIR mines have progressively increased from 1808 tU in 2009, 2726 tU in 2011 and 3065 tU in 2012. Since 2010, the production from SOMAIR Lixi mine has been 1000 tU/yr. The mill capacity has also been upgraded to handle 3000 tU/year. This operation has an annual production rate of 1.4 Mt of low-grade ore with a yield of less than 0.1%U. The processed ore is converted into concentrates and then transported to the ports of Benin. From these ports, they are shipped to Comurhex in France.

== See also ==
- List of countries by uranium production
- List of countries by uranium reserves
- Oil and mining industry of Niger
