= Arlit =

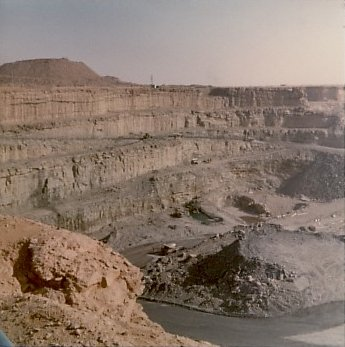
- The open pit Uranium Mine at Arlit

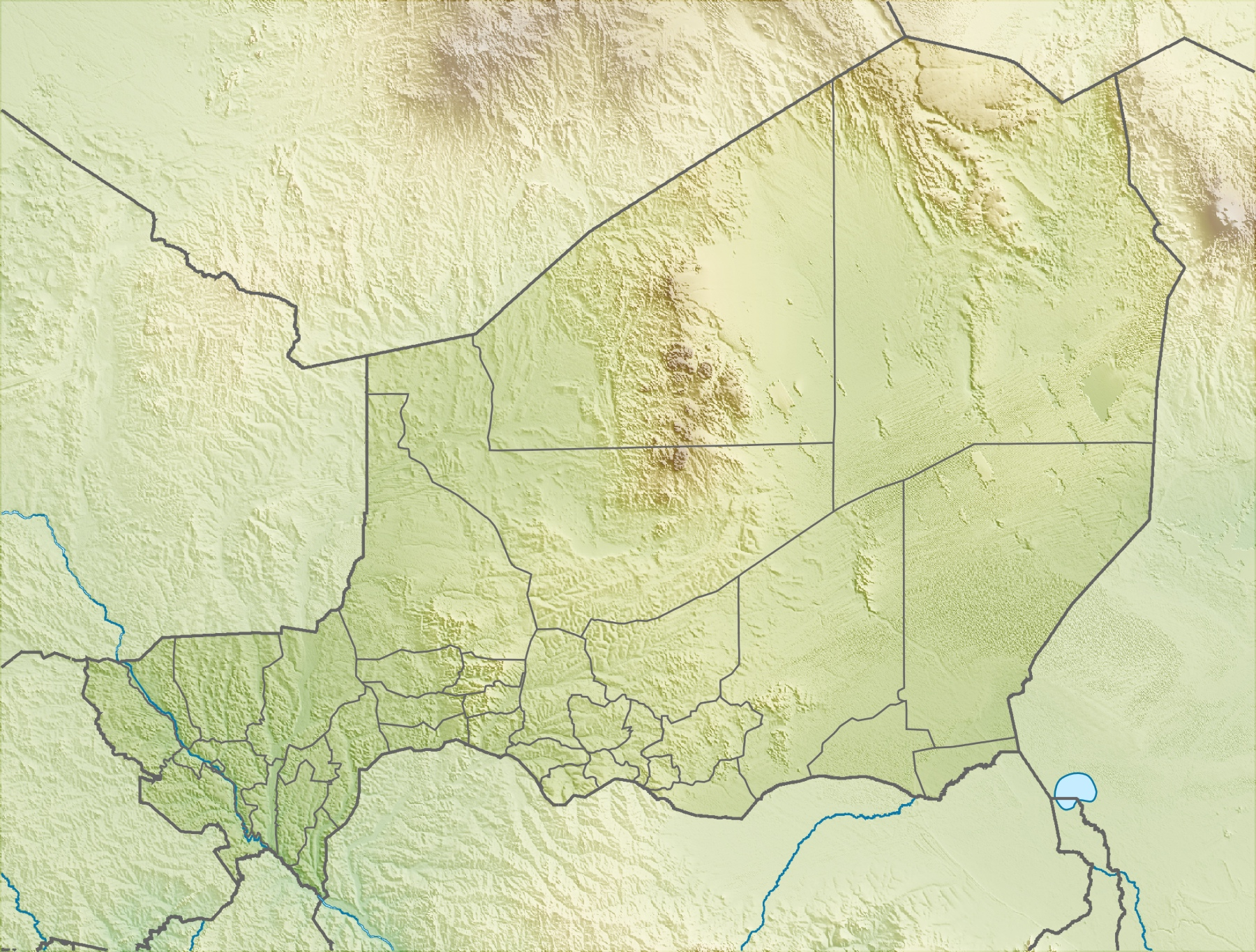
- Location in Niger
- Coordinates: 18°44′N 7°23′E
- Country: Niger
- Region: Agadez Region
- Seat: Arlit Department

Area
  - Total: 1,247 km^{2} (481 sq mi)
- Elevation: 425 m (1,394 ft)

Population (2012 census)
  - Total: 112,432
  - Density: 90.16/km^{2} (233.5/sq mi)

Topographic Map of the Aïr mountains. Arlit is located to the left of the center of the map.

Arlit is an industrial town and capital of the Arlit Department of the Agadez Region of northern-central Niger, built between the Sahara Desert and the eastern edge of the Aïr Mountains. It is 200 kilometers south by road from the border with Algeria. As of 2012, the commune had a total population of 79,725 people.

== Uranium industry ==
Founded in 1969 following the discovery of uranium, it has grown around the mining industry, developed by the French government. Two large uranium mines, at Arlit and nearby Akouta, are exploited by open top strip mining. One open-pit mine was built in 1971 by the National Mining Company of Niger, SOMAIR. The second open-pit mine, as well as a third underground mine, was built by the French Compagnie Minière d'Akouta (or COMINAK). All the ore from both is now processed and transported by a French company Orano Cycle, a holding of the Orano group, itself a state-owned operation of the French Commissariat à l'énergie atomique (CEA). The system of French nuclear power generation, as well as the French nuclear weapons program, is dependent on uranium mined at Arlit. Orano Cycle alone employs 1600 foreign nationals on the site.

In 2017, 2,116 tonnes of uranium were extracted from the Arlit mines and exported to France via truck to the seaport at Cotonou, Bénin. At its peak in the 1980s, 40% of Niger's uranium production came from Arlit, and uranium represented 90% of Niger's exports (by value). A major modern road, known as the Uranium Highway, has been built to transport uranium south, but it has bypassed many towns along the way (In-Gall for example) and has radically changed Niger's transportation system.

=== Boom, bust and recovery ===
In the late 1980s, Arlit suffered from a steep decline in world uranium prices, and the number of foreign employees in the town was cut to 700, a drop which has rebounded by the first decade of the 21st century. The value of Niger's uranium "boom" has never recovered its 1980s level, causing dislocation and suffering for the tens of thousands of Nigeriens who flocked to the shanty towns surrounding Arlit.

Anger at the results of uranium bust, along with a belief that the best jobs were going to those from southern Niger, contributed to the Tuareg Rebellion of the 1990s. As late as 2007, Tuareg nationalists have made a fairer division of profits and jobs for local people a primary demand.

On a macroeconomic scale, Arlit can be said to suffer from Dutch disease, or Dutch curse, a phenomenon where over-emphasis on one particular sector (commonly a highly sought after resource such as oil) hinders normal development of other sectors essential to an economy.

=== Environmental impact ===
The impact on the local environment of the Arlit mining industry has been criticised by African and European Non-Governmental Organisations, and Areva NC has especially been accused of a disregard for health and environmental conditions around its operations. The French NGO Commission for Independent Research and Information on Radioactivity has described the surface nuclear waste piles near Arlit as a danger to the area's water supply.

=== "Yellowcake" controversy ===
In the build-up to the war in Iraq there was controversy over allegations in 2003 that Saddam Hussein was seeking to purchase uranium from Arlit.

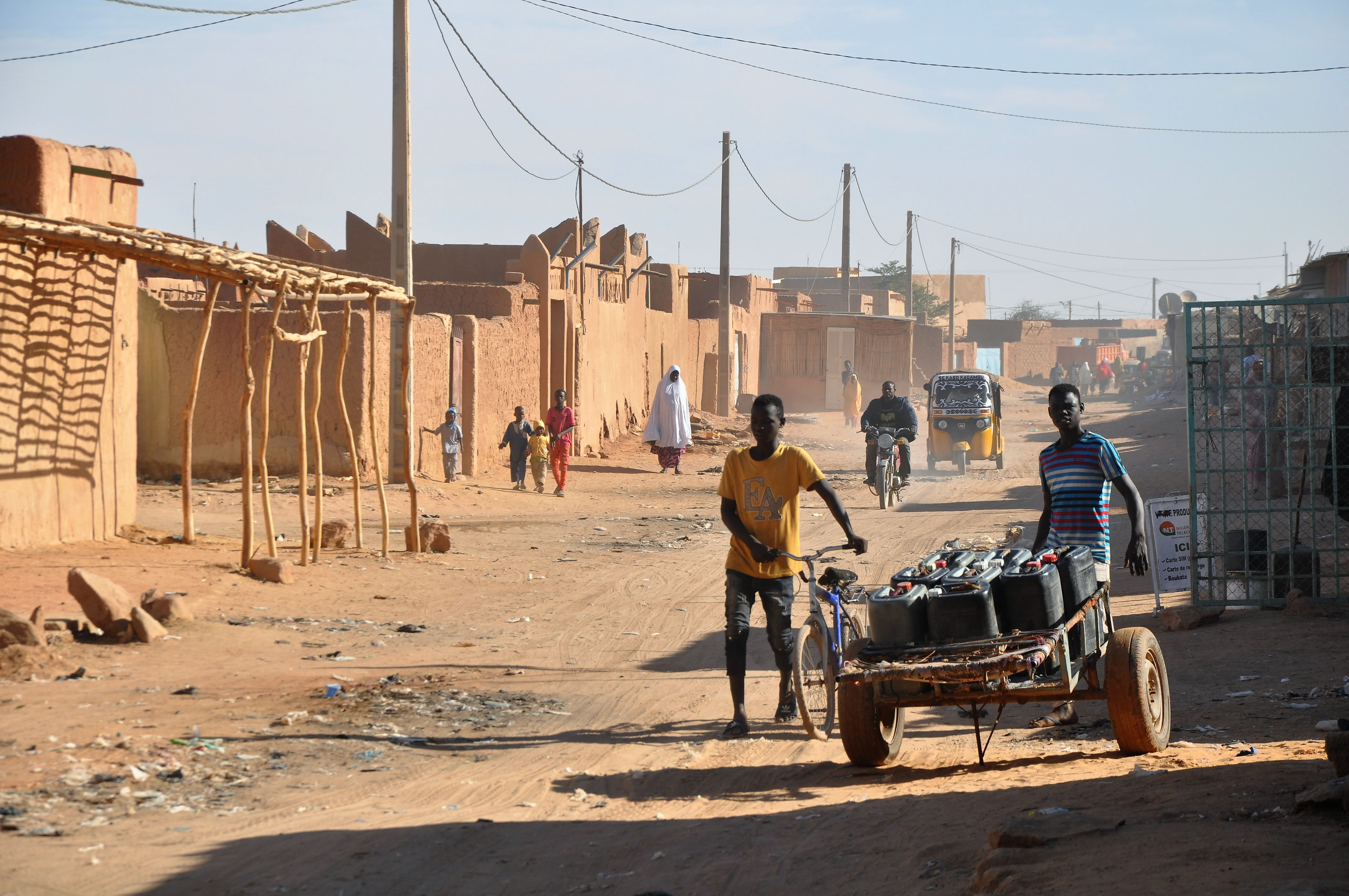
Street scene in Arlit

== Military base ==
The United States has operated a military base in Arlit since approximately 2015.

== Transportation ==
Arlit is served by Arlit Airport.

== In popular culture ==
In 2005 the Beninese filmmaker, Idrissou Mora-Kpai, produced and directed the film Arlit, deuxième Paris (Arlit, a Second Paris) about the large expatriate community in the town.

In 2007 Andersen Press published The Yellowcake Conspiracy, a novel by British children's author Stephen Davies. The novel is an espionage thriller set in and around the Arlit mine.

== Geology ==
More than 25 uranium deposits occur within Mississippian to Cretaceous age sandstones. Key structural features are the Arlit Fault, and intrusions and ring dikes from 480 to 145 Ma in age.

== Climate ==
Arlit has a hot arid climate (BWh under the Köppen-Geiger system.)

Climate data for Arlit
Month	Jan	Feb	Mar	Apr	May	Jun	Jul	Aug	Sep	Oct	Nov	Dec	Year
Mean daily maximum °C (°F)	26.9 (80.4)	30.1 (86.2)	34.3 (93.7)	38.6 (101.5)	41.2 (106.2)	41.5 (106.7)	39.8 (103.6)	38.6 (101.5)	39 (102)	37 (99)	32.3 (90.1)	28.4 (83.1)	35.6 (96.2)
Daily mean °C (°F)	18.8 (65.8)	21.7 (71.1)	25.9 (78.6)	30.5 (86.9)	33.4 (92.1)	34.2 (93.6)	32.8 (91.0)	31.9 (89.4)	31.8 (89.2)	29.3 (84.7)	24.2 (75.6)	20.5 (68.9)	27.9 (82.2)
Mean daily minimum °C (°F)	10.8 (51.4)	13.3 (55.9)	17.5 (63.5)	22.4 (72.3)	25.7 (78.3)	27 (81)	25.9 (78.6)	25.3 (77.5)	24.6 (76.3)	21.6 (70.9)	16.1 (61.0)	12.7 (54.9)	20.2 (68.5)
Average rainfall mm (inches)	0 (0)	0 (0)	0 (0)	1 (0.0)	1 (0.0)	5 (0.2)	11 (0.4)	18 (0.7)	5 (0.2)	0 (0)	0 (0)	0 (0)	41 (1.5)
Source: Climate-Data.org, altitude: 429 metres or 1,407 feet

== See also ==
- Economy of Niger
- Battle of Agadez and Arlit
