= Orano =

French multinational nuclear fuel cycle company

Orano SA

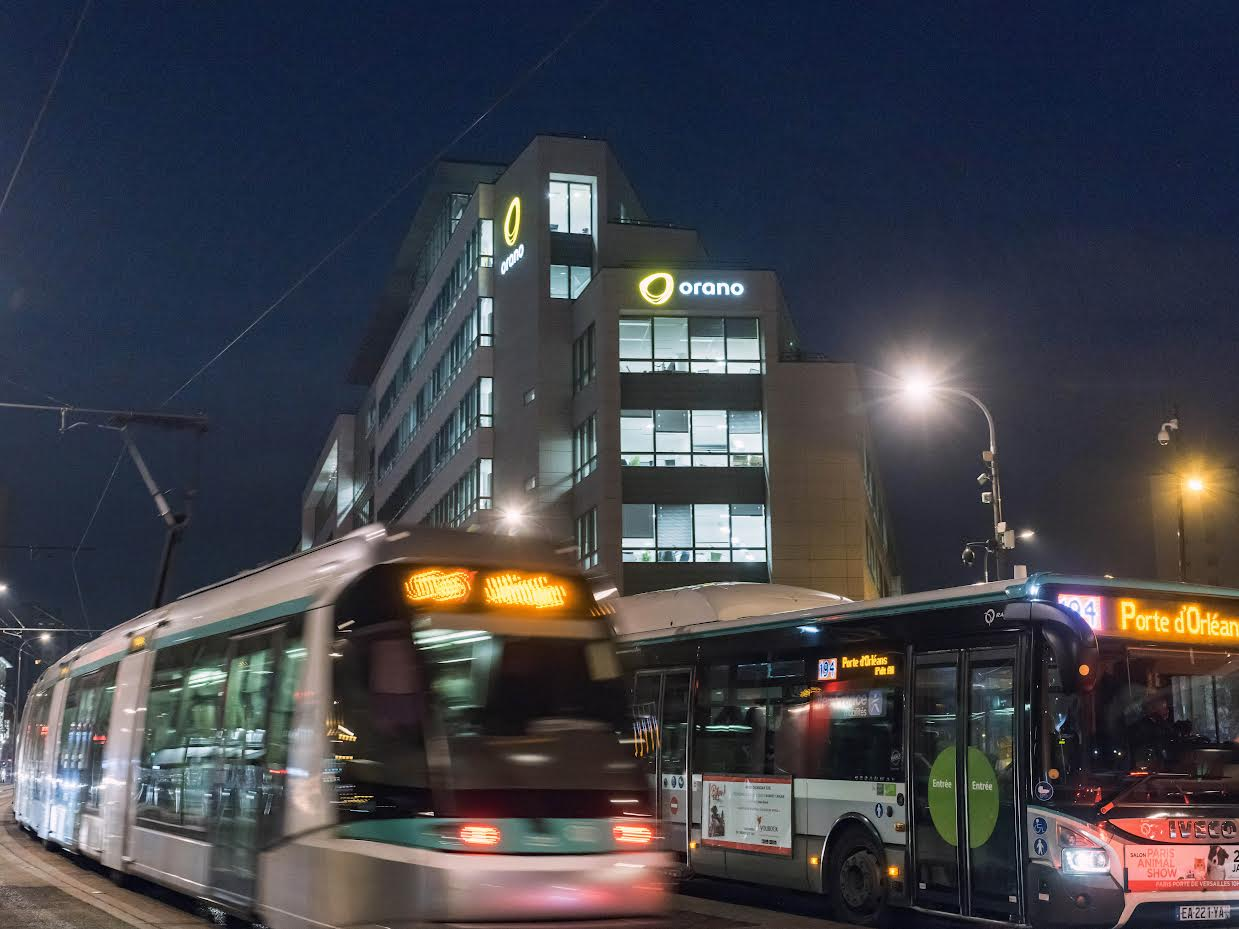
- Headquarters in Châtillon, Greater Paris
- Industry: Nuclear industry
- Predecessor: Areva
- Founded: March 2001; 25 years ago
- Founder: Anne Lauvergeon, Pascal Colombani
- Headquarters: Châtillon (Paris), France
- Area served: Worldwide
- Key people: Claude Imauven (Chairman); Philippe Knoche (CEO)
- Products: Nuclear fuel
- Services: Nuclear enrichment Nuclear material transport Nuclear reprocessing
- Revenue: ▲€5.87 billion (2024)
- Operating income: ▲€1.08 billion (2024)
- Net income: ▲€633 million (2024)
- Total assets: ▲€25.80 billion (2024)
- Total equity: ▲€2.73 billion (2024)
- Owner: Government of France (90%); CEA (1 share); JNFL (5%); Mitsubishi Heavy Industries (5%)
- Number of employees: 17,500 (2024)
- Subsidiaries: Orano Cycle; Orano Mining; Orano Med; Orano TN; Orano Projects; Orano Temis; Orano DS; Orano Assurance & Réassurance; Orano US LLC; Orano Canada
- Website: www.orano.group

Orano SA (French: [ɔʁano]) is a French multinational nuclear fuel cycle corporation headquartered in Châtillon, Hauts-de-Seine. It is majority-owned by the French State. The company is engaged in uranium mining, conversion-enrichment, spent fuel recycling, nuclear logistics, dismantling, and nuclear cycle engineering activities. It was created in 2017 as a result of restructuring and recapitalizing of the nuclear conglomerate Areva.

Orano has shifted from the second largest uranium producer in the world with a 9% share in global uranium production in 2021 to the third largest uranium producer in the world with an 11% share of global uranium production in 2024. As of 2025 Orano accounted for 11% of global enrichment capacity and 24% of global conversion capacity.

== Etymology ==
The name Orano is derived from Ouranos, the Greek god, and it refers to uranium. The company's circular yellow logo refers to yellowcake uranium concentrate and to the nuclear fuel cycle.

== History ==
Orano dates back to 1976 when based on the production division of the French Alternative Energies and Atomic Energy Commission (CEA), the Compagnie générale des matières nucléaires (COGEMA, now Orano Cycle) was created. In 2001, COGEMA was merged with Framatome and CEA Industrie to form Areva.

In 2016, due to financial difficulties, Areva initiated a restructuring process. As part of this, it created a new fuel cycle company, dubbed as New Co or New Areva. The new company combined Areva Mines, Areva NC, Areva Projects, and Areva Business Support companies. It was created as a wholly owned subsidiary of Areva; however, Areva lost control over the company as the French government invested to recapitalize the company. On 23 January 2018 the company changed its name to Orano. In February 2018, Japan Nuclear Fuel Limited and Mitsubishi Heavy Industries took 5% stakes in the company each.

In September 2018, the United States Nuclear Regulatory Commission terminated the license of Orano to construct the Eagle Rock Enrichment Facility, which was to be built in Bonneville County, Idaho. The project had been suspended since December 2011. At the same time Orano opened the Philippe Coste uranium conversion plant in France.

In 2023 Orano's board of directors approved a 30% expansion of the Georges-Besse II enrichment facility in France that will add 2.5 million SWU per year capacity by 2028 at an estimated cost of €1.7 billion.

On January 17, 2025, Orano signed a uranium deal with the Mongolian government to develop the Zuuvch-Ovoo uranium deposit located in the Gobi Desert.

On March 12, 2025, in Uzbekistan, Orano signed an agreement with the producer Navoiyuran.

In January 2026 Orano won a $900 million award from the U.S. Department of Energy to start enriching uranium in the U.S. and it now plans to construct a "Project Ike" enrichment facility in Oak Ridge, Tennessee at a cost of $5 billion.

== Controversies ==
Orano has maintained business relationships with Russia despite international sanctions following the 2022 Russian invasion of Ukraine. The company has faced backlash for its decision to maintain its presence in the Russian market, as critics argue that such operations indirectly support the Russian economy.

Orano faced controversies related to its uranium mining operations in Niger, including environmental issues and the impact on local communities. Geopolitical tensions have also raised concerns about the security and control of uranium resources in the region. Reports have emerged indicating that Orano is at risk of losing its Niger uranium mine to interests associated with Russia, heightening worries about the company's operations and involvement in international affairs.

In December 2024, the French state‑owned nuclear company Orano announced that the junta had taken operational control of its subsidiary Somaïr. Efforts to resume exports had already been blocked for months, pushing Somaïr into financial crisis. The disruption forced France and the European Union to seek alternative suppliers, and EU uranium imports from Russia also rose significantly, complicating efforts to reduce dependence on Moscow during the war in Ukraine.

The junta’s stance reflected both nationalist sentiment, long critical of France’s dominant role in Niger’s uranium sector, and political retaliation against Paris, which condemned the coup and supported the West African bloc ECOWAS in its pressure campaign. In June 2024, Niger cancelled Orano’s rights to develop the large Imouraren deposit, further undermining French interests.

Niger was considering exporting yellowcake to Iran and contacts between the two governments have deepened, with Niger's Prime Minister Ali Mahamane Lamine Zeine visiting Tehran in Jan 2024.

As consequence the Somaïr mine got into a financial crisis, threatening hundreds of jobs in the northern town of Arlit. Communities in the desert region, long dependent on uranium mining, face severe economic hardship as stockpiled uranium worth over $200 million remains unsold. The cancellation of Orano’s rights to develop the Imouraren deposit has further undermined prospects for future growth in the sector.

On 23 September 2024 the ICSID ordered Niger to halt the sale or transfer of uranium mined before the suspension of operations at the Somaïr site in case Orano Mining SAS versus Republic of Niger No. ARB/25/8, following a complaint by the French state‑owned nuclear company Orano. The ruling came after Niger’s military government expropriated Orano’s 63.4% stake in the mine, part of a broader regional trend in which military‑led governments in Mali, Burkina Faso, and Guinea have asserted greater control over natural resources.

== Operations ==
Orano is engaged in uranium mining, conversion and enrichment, spent fuel recycling, nuclear logistics, dismantling, and nuclear cycle engineering activities. Its main subsidiaries include Orano Cycle, COGEMA and Areva NC, which is active in all stages of the nuclear fuel cycle; Orano Mining, which is active in mining activities, including exploration, extraction, and processing of uranium ore, Orano Med which focuses on the development of therapies to fight cancer; Orano TN, which deals with the transport of nuclear materials; and Orano Projects, which is responsible for the fuel cycle engineering.

=== Mining ===
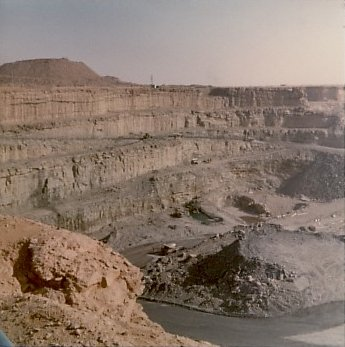
The open pit uranium mine at Arlit, Niger.

As of 2024, Orano is the third largest uranium producer in the world with an 11% share of global uranium production. Orano operates uranium production sites in Canada, Kazakhstan, and has uranium production sites in Niger that are currently the subject of legal disputes. The operations of Orano Canada include interests in the McClean Lake uranium mill, Cigar Lake mine, McArthur River mine, and Key Lake uranium mill. In Kazakhstan, Orano has a joint venture with Kazatomprom named Katco. In Niger, Orano previously two mines near Arlit, in northern Niger, called Somair and Cominak, and was also developing the Imouraren project situated 80 kilometres (50 mi) from Arlit. In addition, it owns the mothballed Trekkopje mine in Namibia, together with the Desalination Plant near Swakopmund. In Gabon, it owns the site of former Mounana uranium mine where mining activities were carried out between 1961 and 1999.

=== Processing ===
The conversion and enrichment operations are carried out in Malvési and Tricastin sites in France.

=== Transportation and storage ===
Nuclear material transport and storage services are provided through Orano TN subsidiary. In 2017 the NUHOMS Matrix advanced used nuclear fuel storage overpack, a high-density system for storing multiple spent fuel rods in canisters, was launched.

=== Recycling ===
Orano provides nuclear recycling activities at the La Hague and Melox sites in France.

=== Engineering ===
Orano provides nuclear fuel cycle engineering services through its subsidiary Orano Projects. Its engineering sites are located in Equeurdreville, Saint-Quentin-en-Yvelines, and Bagnols-sur-Cèze, France. The subsidiary Orano Temis is involved in mechanical engineering and manufactures special equipment, relating to the nuclear fuel cycle, as well as serving external customers in the aerospace and defense sectors. In at least one case Orano has been contracted for feasibility studies.

=== Nuclear medicine ===
Orano's subsidiary Orano Med deals with nuclear medicine, including the development of therapies to fight cancer. It has laboratories in Bessines-sur-Gartempe, France, and Plano, Texas, United States.

== See also ==
- European Atomic Energy Community
- International Atomic Energy Agency
- World Nuclear Industry Status Report
