= Rita =

Rita may refer to:

== People ==
- Rita (given name)
- Rita (Indian singer) (born 1984)
- Rita (Israeli singer) (born 1962)
- Rita (Japanese singer)
- Eliza Humphreys (1850–1938), wrote under the pseudonym Rita

== Places ==
- Djarrit, also known as Rita, a community in the Marshall Islands
- 1180 Rita, an asteroid
- Rita, West Virginia
- Santa Rita, California (disambiguation), several places

== Film, television, and theater ==
- Rita (1959 film), an Australian television play
- Rita (2009 Italian film), an Italian film
- Rita (2009 Indian film), a Marathi film directed by Renuka Shahane
- Rita (2024 Guatemalan film), Guatemalan dark fantasy film
- Rita (2024 Spanish film), an upcoming Spanish drama film
- Rita (TV series), a Danish television show
- RITA Award, an award for romantic fiction
- Educating Rita, a 1980 stage play by Willy Russel
  - Educating Rita (film), a 1983 British film based on that play
- Rita Oberoi, fictional character in the 1982 Indian film Disco Dancer, played by Kim Yashpal
- Rita Santos, an adult mermaid on the TV series Mako Mermaids

== Music ==
- Rita (opera), an 1841 opera by Gaetano Donizetti

=== Albums ===
- Rita (Rita Yahan-Farouz album), 4× platinum album by Israeli singer Rita 1986
- Rita, 2× platinum album by Rita MacNeil 1989
- Rita (Rita Guerra album), a 2× platinum Portuguese-language album by Rita Guerra 2005

=== Songs ===
- "Rita", a 1972 song by Arthur Conley
- "Rita", a 1976 song by Marcel Khalife
- "Rita", a 1967 song by The Men (pop rock band)
- "Rita", a song by Powderfinger from the 2003 album Vulture Street

=== Other uses in arts and entertainment ===
- Rita (roller coaster), a roller coaster at Alton Towers, England
- Rita Repulsa, a villain in the TV series Mighty Morphin Power Rangers

== Weather ==
- Hurricane Rita
- Tropical Storm Rita (disambiguation), the name of several storms

== Other uses ==
- Budweiser Rita, a group of flavored drinks made by Anheuser-Busch
- Shortening of margarita (the tequila-based sour cocktail)
- Nakajima G8N, Japanese WWII naval heavy bomber, codenamed "Rita"
- Research and Innovative Technology Administration, research programs agency within the U.S. Department of Transportation
- Resistance Inside the Army, a protest movement
- RiTa, an open-source programming library
- RIT Ambulance, an emergency medical services organization
- Rita the Rock Planter, a giant wooden sculpture in Colorado, USA.
- Rita (chimpanzee)
- Rita (fish), a genus of catfishes
- Rta (also transliterated as Rita), a cosmic order in Hinduism

== See also ==
- RTA (disambiguation)
- Margarita (disambiguation)
- Margherita (disambiguation)
- Rita Rocks, a 2008-2009 U.S. TV series starring Nicole Sullivan
