= RTA =

RTA may refer to:

== Media ==
- Radio and Television Arts, program at Ryerson University, Toronto, Canada
- Radio Television Afghanistan
  - RTA TV, an Afghan channel
- Radiodiffusion Télévision Algérienne
- Real-time attack, a game speedrun performed by a human without the use of external tools

== Science and technology ==
- Rapid thermal anneal, in semiconductor fabrication
- Real-time analyzer of audio spectrum
- Renal tubular acidosis, a medical condition
- Restricted to Adults
- Retrospective Think Aloud
- RTA clade of araneomorph spiders
  - Retrolateral tibial apophysis, defining the RTA clade

== Transportation ==
- Railway Tie Association
- Road traffic accident

=== United States ===
- Regional Transportation Authority (Illinois), Chicago
- Regional Transportation Authority (Tennessee), Nashville
- Regional Transportation Agency of Central Maryland
- Regional Transit Authority of Southeast Michigan, Metro Detroit
- Central Puget Sound Regional Transit Authority
- New Orleans Regional Transit Authority
- South Florida Regional Transportation Authority

==== California ====
- Riverside Transit Agency, California
- San Luis Obispo Regional Transit Authority, California, US

==== Ohio ====
- Greater Cleveland Regional Transit Authority, Ohio
  - RTA Rapid Transit, the rail system operated by the above body
- Greater Dayton Regional Transit Authority, Ohio

=== Australia ===
- Former Roads & Traffic Authority, New South Wales, Australia

=== United Arab Emirates ===
- Roads & Transport Authority (Dubai)
- Roads & Transport Authority (Sharjah)

== Other uses ==
- Ṛta or rita, a Hindu religious concept
- RTA (Niger), a village
- Ready-to-assemble furniture
- Regional trade agreement
- Rehabilitation Through the Arts
- Residential Tenancies Authority, Queensland, Australia
- Rio Tinto Aluminium
- Royal Thai Army
  - RTA 5 (Thailand); the Thai state-run television owned by Royal Thai Army
- Race Team Alliance
- RTA (album), by Rudra

== See also ==
- Rita (disambiguation)
