= RTA (Niger) =

- Location in Niger
- Coordinates: 18°4′50.73″N 7°32′13.19″E
- Country: Niger
- Region: Agadez Region
- Department: Arlit Department
- Commune: Dannet Commune

RTA (also Rta or R.T.A.) is a village in northern Niger, lying -roughly- halfway between Agadez and Arlit. Administratively, it falls under the Agadez Region, Arlit Department, Dannet Commune.

The village does not seem to have an official name, although some sources describe the locality where the village sprang up to have been named Anou Makarene, sometimes written as Anoumakaram. However, Anou Makarene is the name of the large wadi that passes just 1 km north of the village and that originates some 140 km further east, in the Aïr Mountains. RTA is thus a colloquial name, and is an abbreviation of Route de Tahoua-Arlit or Route de Tahoua-Agadez-Arlit. This route (road) was built between 1978 and 1980 by the Société Financière pour la Construction de la Route Tahoua-Arlit (SFCTA) to provide access to the uranium mines at Arlit.
The current settlement was formed as a temporary camp where road builders lived with their families. Some merchants and traders joined them and at one time the locality had some 500 inhabitants. After the completion of the road many of them left but the settlement was not abandoned as the Service d'Entretien de la Route Tahoua-Arlit (SERTA) continued to operate a maintenance depot there. In the early 1990s the village was attacked several times by Touareg rebels, such as on 18 May 1992 when rebels looted the place. RTA was abandoned after the assassination of the village chief in one of these attacks.
People gradually returned after the end of the rebellion though. But according to the "Collectif Tchinaghen" (a group fighting against the influence of the mining industry in northern Niger) the village would have been abandoned again on 26 June 2008 after threats and harassment of the population by elements of the Armed Forces of Niger. 150 families would have left, their houses and gardens destroyed. They returned yet again. In February 2012 the Niger Media and Telecoms Landscape Guide mentioned RTA as a locality with a functioning community radio station.

Currently (December 2018), the road from Agadez to Arlit has deteriorated to such a point that RTA is a welcome stop for tired truck and bus drivers. Many market stalls and the occasional small local restaurant sell food and drinks to travellers before they continue their journey. There is no gas station at RTA. Less than 2 km north of the village there's a military camp. Just south of RTA starts the side road to Imouraren and the uranium mine there.

== Climate ==
RTA has a desert climate, categorized as "BWh" according to the Köppen climate classification. The average annual temperature (day and night) is 28.0 °C; the average daily maximum temperatures in May and June are over 41 °C. In cold January nights temperatures may drop to 11 °C. Annual rainfall is around 66 mm; 74% of which falls in July and August. In the 8 months from October to May rainfall is just 3 mm.

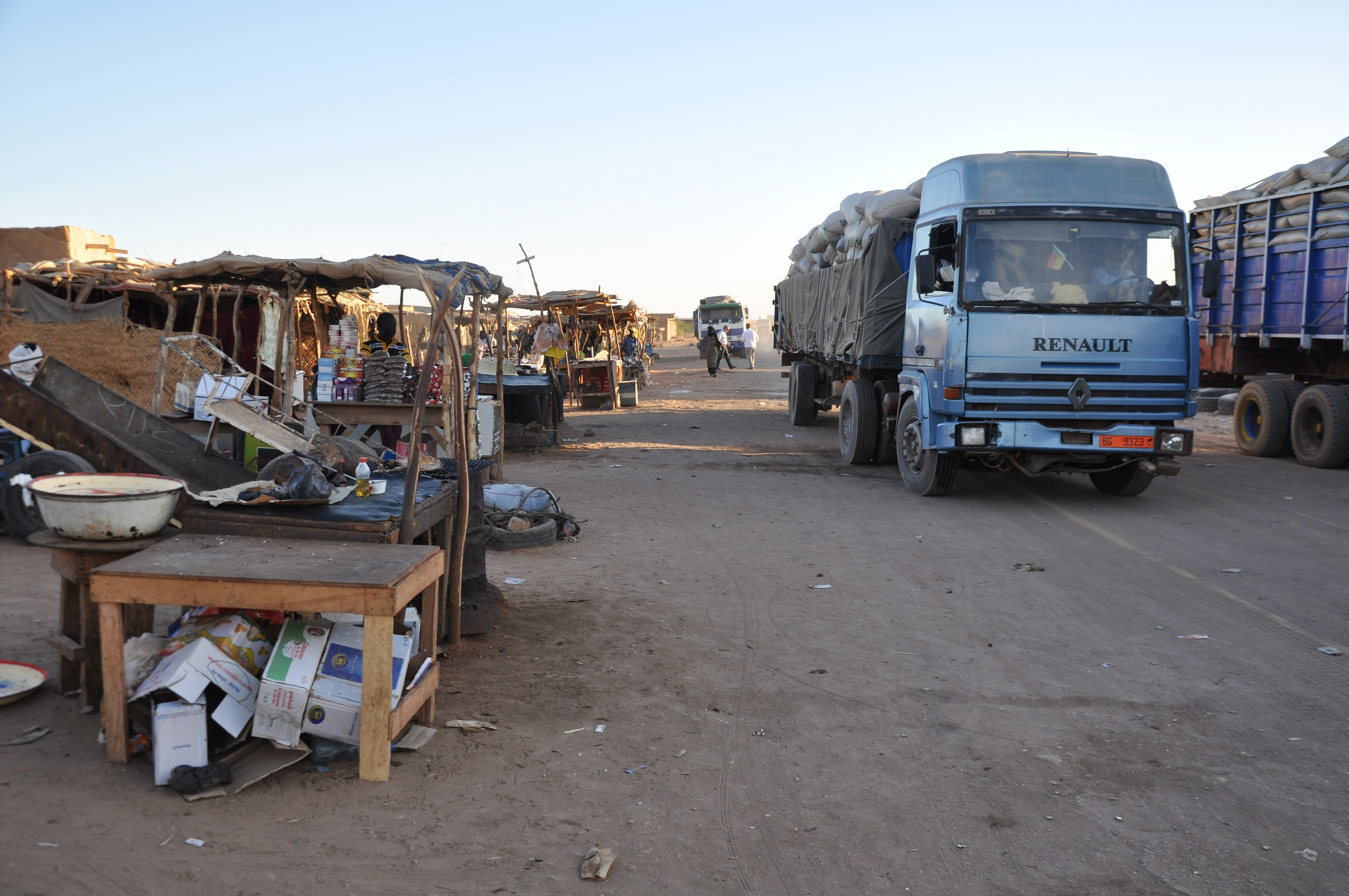
Scene in RTA

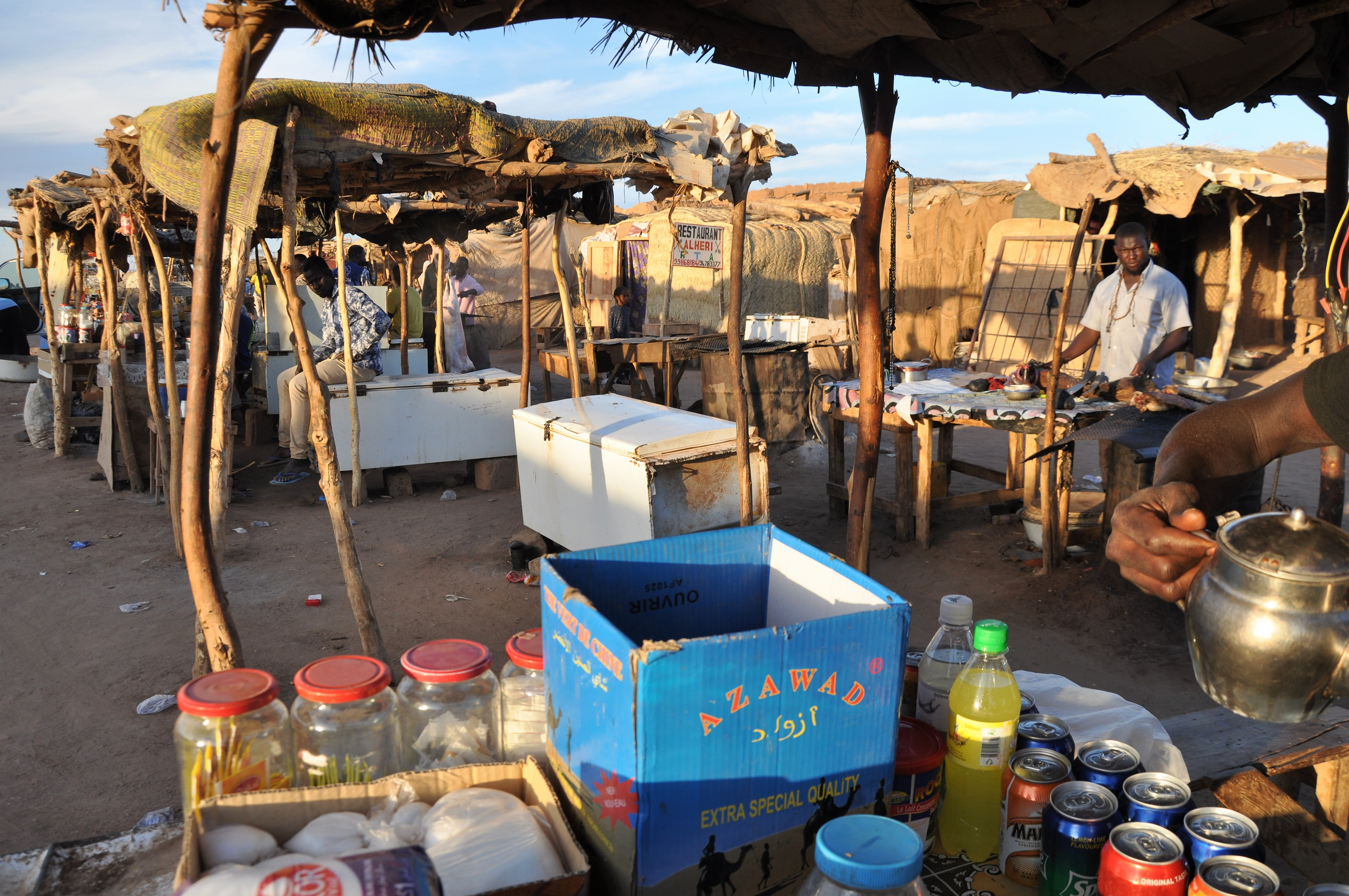
Market stalls and restaurant in RTA

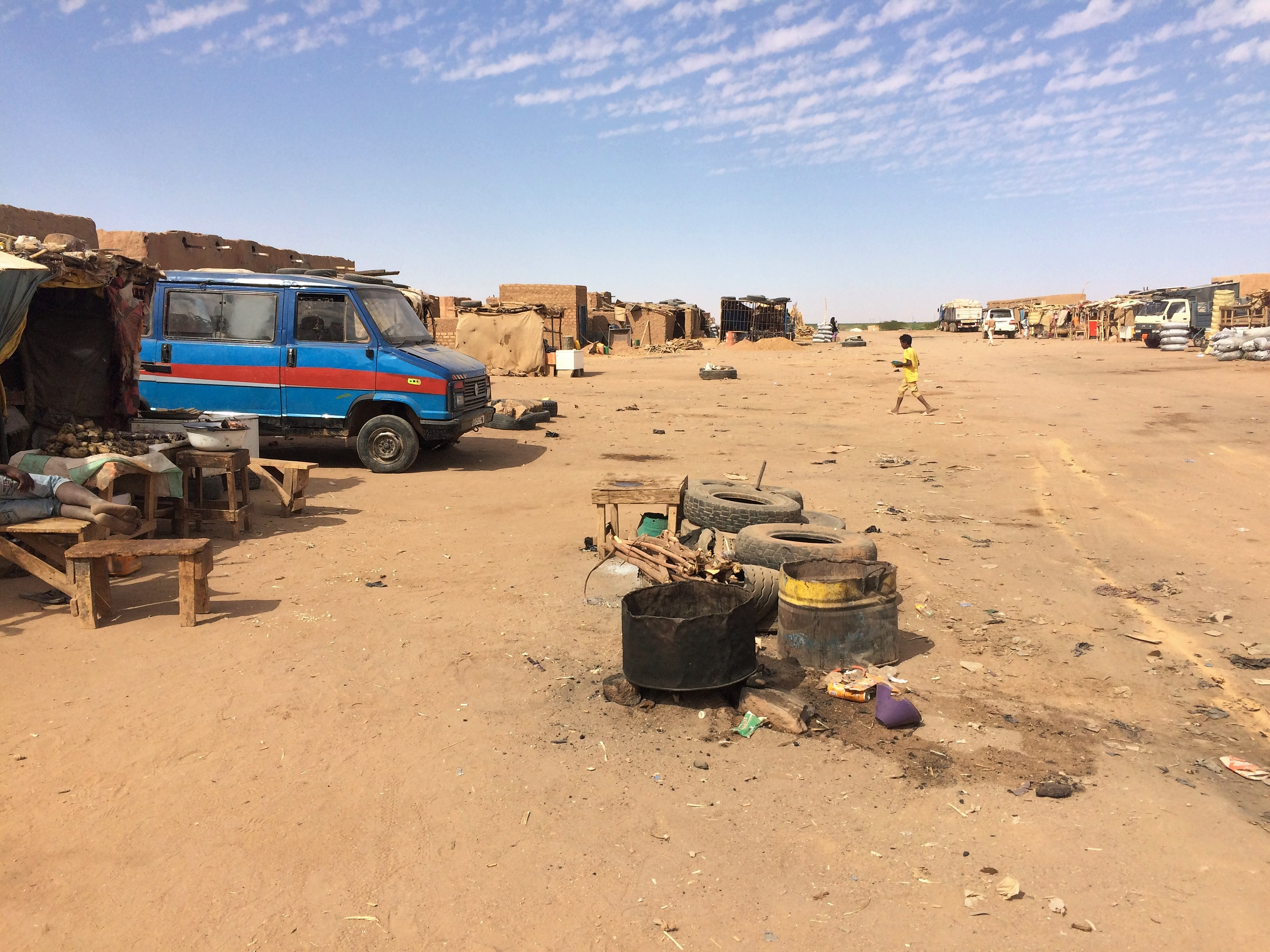
RTA at midday
