= Elok =

- Location in Niger
- Coordinates: 19°3′N 8°28′E
- Country: Niger
- Region: Agadez Region
- Department: Arlit Department
- Time zone: UTC+1 (WAT)

Elok is human settlement in the Arlit Department of the Agadez Region of northern-central Niger.
