= Department of Housing and Public Works =

State government department in Queensland, Australia

Department overview
- Jurisdiction: Queensland Government
- Headquarters: 1 William Street, Brisbane
- Employees: ▲5,436 (2019)
- Annual budget: ▲ A$1.365 billion (2019–20)
- Minister responsible: Minister for Housing and Public Works and Minister for Youth
- Department executive: Mark Cridland, Director-General
- Child agencies: Service Queensland; Queensland Shared Services; QFleet
- Website: housing.qld.gov.au

The Department of Housing and Public Works is a ministerial department of the Queensland Government that is responsible for housing, sport, digital technology, and urban design and architectural services in Queensland. Both Service Queensland and Queensland Shared Services (QSS) sit within the Housing and Public Works portfolio, providing whole-of-government services including HR, payroll, procurement, infrastructure, and state-wide contact centre solutions.

The department was previously called the Department of Housing, Local Government, Planning and Public Works prior to the November 2024 machinery-of-government changes.

== Executive leadership ==
=== Minister and director-general ===
The various streams within the department are responsible to the Queensland Parliament through the Minister for Housing and Public Works and Minister for Youth. Since 1 November 2024, Sam O’Connor is the Minister for Housing and Public Works and Minister for Youth. Day-to-day operations are led by the department director-general, currently Mark Cridland, who reports to the minister.

=== Leadership structure ===
Each division within the department has a senior responsible officer for that stream, normally a deputy director-general. The Customer and Digital Group's senior responsible officer is the Queensland Government's Chief Customer and Digital Officer. The Office of the Director-General is managed operationally by an executive director, but is led by the director-general.

== Department structure ==
The department has six divisions, each headed up by a Deputy Director-General. The department also administers four government bodies and the Office of Night-Life Commissioner that reports to the Minister and a Strategy and Reform unit that reports directly to the Director-General

=== Policy, Performance and First Nations ===
This division includes:

- First Nations Housing and Homelessness
- Regulatory Services
- Strategic Policy and Intergovernmental Relations
- Office for Youth and Safer Schoolies Initiative

=== Housing and Homelessness Services ===
This division includes:

- Housing and Homelessness Programs
- Service Delivery

=== Social and Affordable Housing Growth ===
This division includes:

- Housing Development
- Social Housing Delivery

=== Public Works ===
This division includes:

- QBuild
- Building Policy
- Major Projects
- Disaster Resilience Program
- Queensland Government Accommodation Office
- Queensland Government Architect

=== Corporate Services ===
This division includes:

- Finance
- People and Culture
- Legal Services
- Information and Digital Services
- Technology and Digital Solutions
- Strategic Communication and Engagement
- Professional Standards and Performance
- Internal Audit

=== Procurement ===
This division incorporates:

- Policy
- Compliance
- General Goods and Services
- QFleet

== Government bodies ==
The department is responsible for four government bodies including:

- Queensland Building and Construction Commission
- Board of Architects of Queensland
- Board of Engineers of Queensland
- Residential Tenancies Authority

who each report to the responsible minister.

== Whole-of-government services ==
The department, through the Customer and Digital Group, also provides some services to other state government departments, some local governments, and some state-owned corporations or authorities.

=== Queensland Shared Services ===
Queensland Shared Services (QSS) provides internal support and services for most Queensland Government departments and agencies. QSS supports departments by operating public and internally facing services such as government human resources, payroll, finance, procurement, telecommunications, accommodation, and mail services. Education Queensland does not use QSS in any capacity, whilst some Hospital and Health Services within Queensland Health only use QSS for some limited HR processes such as job evaluations.

=== Service Queensland ===
Service Queensland provides contact centre services to the public, meaning people can access state government services through one contact rather than dealing with agencies individually. SSQ delivers the 13 QGOV call centre and the Queensland Government master website (qld.gov.au). They also manage the Queensland Government Service Centres in Brisbane, Maroochydore and Cairns, and the Queensland Government Agent Program which allow people in regional and rural areas to access services from existing businesses in the area such as newsagents or post offices.

=== QFleet ===
QFleet is the whole-of-government fleet management service, provides vehicle procurement, sales, leasing, maintenance, safety, and policy services to Queensland Government departments and limited other entities. Several other agencies hold their own fleet management services, particularly those with large fleets, such as the Queensland Ambulance Service, Fire Department, Police, and some larger Hospital and Health Services. Fleet vehicles can be identified by their number plate; all QFleet registration numbers start with "QG" for Queensland Government.

== Legislation ==
Department of Housing and Public Works is the administering department for several Queensland statutes. These include the:

- Housing Act 2003
  - Housing Regulations 2015
- Major Sport Facilities Act 2001
  - Major Sports Facilities Regulation 2014
- Mt. Gravatt Showgrounds Act 1988
- Sports Anti-Doping Act 2003
- Plumbing and Drainage Act 2018
  - Plumbing and Drainage Regulation 2019
- Housing Legislation (Building Better Futures) Amendment Act 2017
  - Manufactured Homes (Residential Parks) Act 2003
  - Residential Services (Accreditation) Act 2002
    - Residential Services (Accreditation) Regulation 2018
  - Retirement Villages Act 1999
  - Residential Tenancies and Rooming Accommodation Act 2008

== History ==
=== Before federation (pre-1901) ===
- 1862: The Lands and Works Department was created in 1862.
- 1866: The Lands and Works Department was divided into the Lands Department and the Public Works Department.
- 1887: The Public Works and Mines Departments merge.
- 1890: The Public Works Department was established from the former Mines and Works Department.

=== 1901–2000 ===
- 1909: The early 20th century marks the Queensland Government's first involvement in housing when it introduces The Workers' Dwellings Act 1909 to provide subsidised housing for workers. The Workers' Dwelling Branch is established shortly after and is responsible for lending money and providing house construction expertise to Queenslanders.
- 1920: The Workers' Dwellings Branch was transferred to the State Advances Corporation.
- 1939: Staff from the Public Works Department are deployed to Townsville to assist with defence projects during World War II. As a result, the department becomes heavily involved in defence projects including the construction of the Garbutt Air Base, large warehouses at depots at Macrossan and Breddan, and a military hospital at Blackwater. The department was also involved in procuring and sending food supplies. The Department of Public Works' Townsville office becomes the epicentre for the department's work during World War II.
- 1945: The Queensland Housing Commission was established following federal and state investment in post-war reconstruction.
- 1947: To meet the demand for housing, the Queensland Housing Commission started building the State's first rental homes.
- 1970: Due to changes to the Family Law Act, including the addition of no-fault divorce, and the subsequence rise of smaller households, the commission began developing unit blocks and attached houses rather than standalone large estate developments.
- 1975: The Public Works Department begins designing and developing the Queensland Cultural Centre
- 1989: The Administrative Services Department is formed, encompassing the former Public Works Department.
- 1992: The Department of Housing, Local Government and Planning is formed. Responsibility for the Aboriginal Rental Housing program transfers to the Queensland Department of Housing, Local Government and Planning.
- 1996: The Department of Public Works and Housing is formed.
- 1998: The Public Works and Housing Department separates into two portfolios, with Housing becoming its own department to streamline state housing efforts. The Smart Housing initiative and Community Renewal program.

=== 21st century ===
- 2001: The department wins the Royal Australian Institute of Architects' Harry Marks Sustainable Architectural Award for the design of Redcliffe City Council library and gallery.
- 2002: QFleet won the Australasian Fleet Managers Association (AFMA) 2002 Fleet Environment Award for its ongoing corporate fleet environment practices. QFleet also became the first organisation to receive all three of AFMA's major industry awards, also winning the Fleet Safety Award and later the Fleet Manager of the Year award. In the same year, the Department of Public Works was recognised for its heritage conservation efforts with a gold award, the John Herbert Heritage Award from the National Trust of Queensland for the restoration of the 173-year-old convict-built Commissariat Store in William Street, Brisbane.
- 2005: The department assumes a leadership role for the Queensland Government's four-year Responding to Homelessness initiative after earlier leading work aimed at improving cross-agency responses to homelessness.
- 2008: The department commences RentConnect, and becomes the Queensland conduit for the National Rental Affordability Scheme, a federal and state government initiative to stimulate the supply of 50,000 new affordable rental dwellings across Australia.
- 2012: The Department of Housing and Public Works is formed from the previous departments of Housing and Public Works.
