= Dabaga, Niger =

Dabaga
- Location in Niger
- Coordinates: 17°16′N 08°06′E
- Country: Niger
- Region: Agadez Region
- Department: Tchirozérine Department

Area
  - Total: 3,232 km^{2} (1,248 sq mi)

Population (2012 census)
  - Total: 23,969
  - Density: 7.416/km^{2} (19.21/sq mi)
  - Summer (DST): UTC+1 (WAT)

Dabaga is a town and rural commune in the Agadez Region of northern Niger. The town is situated around 50 kilometers north of the regional capital, Agadez, on the main road leading north into the Aïr Mountains and the town of Elmeki. Like the nearby communities of Azel, Elmeki and Egandawel, Dabaga is an oasis in the Aïr Massif valleys, populated by both sedentary and semi-nomadic Tuaregs and small numbers of Hausa and other groups. According to the census 2012, Dabaga had a permanent population of 23,969, mostly families of Tuareg pastoralists, where the adult men traveled with their herds.

Though a village with a long history, Dabaga was officially designated the chief place of its own "Rural Commune" in 2002. It is one of five communes in the Tchirozérine Department.

== 2007–2008 violence ==
Dramatically affected by unrest in 2007–2008, Dabaga was briefly a center for a Doctors Without Borders project, which was forced out at the end of October 2007 due to attacks from unknown assailants.

In early 2008, Amnesty International alleged the civilian population had suffered repeated attacks by the Nigerien military, who suspect the residents of supporting Niger Movement for Justice (Mouvement des Nigériens pour la justice, MNJ) rebels in the ongoing Second Tuareg Rebellion. Amnesty reported that the village head, among others, had been murdered by Nigerien armed forces.
