= Tegguiada In Tessoum =

Coordinates: 17°25′44.68″N 6°38′35.51″E

Tegguiada In Tessoum is a town in Agadez Region, Arlit Department, Niger. Its largely season population is based in the nearby town of Ingall who oversee a historic salt producing industry.
