= Goûgaram =

- Commune and town
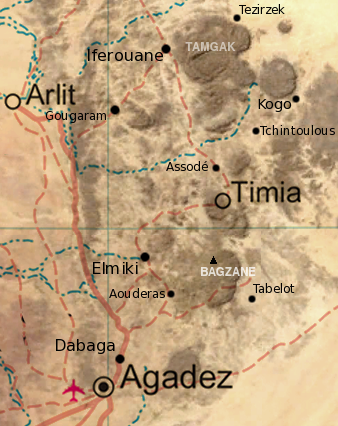
- Regional location

- Location in Niger
- Coordinates: 18°28′57″N 7°47′4″E
- Country: Niger
- Region: Agadez Region
- Department: Arlit Department

Area
  - Total: 18,250 sq mi (47,266 km^{2})

Population (2012 census)
  - Total: 10,336
  - Density: 0.56637/sq mi (0.21868/km^{2})
- Time zone: UTC+1 (WAT)

Goûgaram is a town and commune in the Arlit Department of the Agadez Region of northern-central Niger. As of 2012, the commune had a population of 10,336.
