= Tchintoulous =

- village
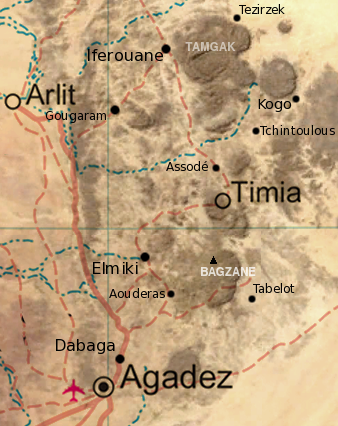
- Regional location

- Location in Niger
- Coordinates: 18°34′56″N 8°47′58″E
- Country: Niger
- Region: Agadez Region
- Department: Arlit Department
- Time zone: UTC+1 (WAT)

Tchintoulous (also written as Tintellust and Tin Telloust) is a village in the Arlit Department of the Agadez Region of northern-central Niger.

== Geography ==
The village, led by a traditional village head (chef traditionnel), lies in a valley between the mountains Agueraguer (1,730 m (5,675 ft 10 in)) in the north and Goundaï (1,768 m (5,800 ft 6 1/2 in)) in the south. The settlement belongs to the municipal area of Iférouane and to the UNESCO World Heritage Site Aïr and Ténéré National Nature Reserve. The settlement of Iférouane, the main town of the rural commune of Iférouane and the Iférouane Department in the Agadez Region, is located approximately 66 kilometers northwest of Tchintoulous.

Acacias thrive in the gallery forest of Tchintoulous, which grows in a low-lying area. It is under protected area status. The area around Tchintoulous is a habitat for Dorcas gazelles, cheetahs, and patas monkeys.

== History ==
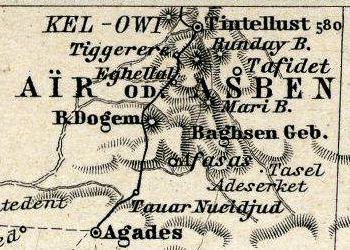
Tchintoulous in Stielers Handatlas (1891)

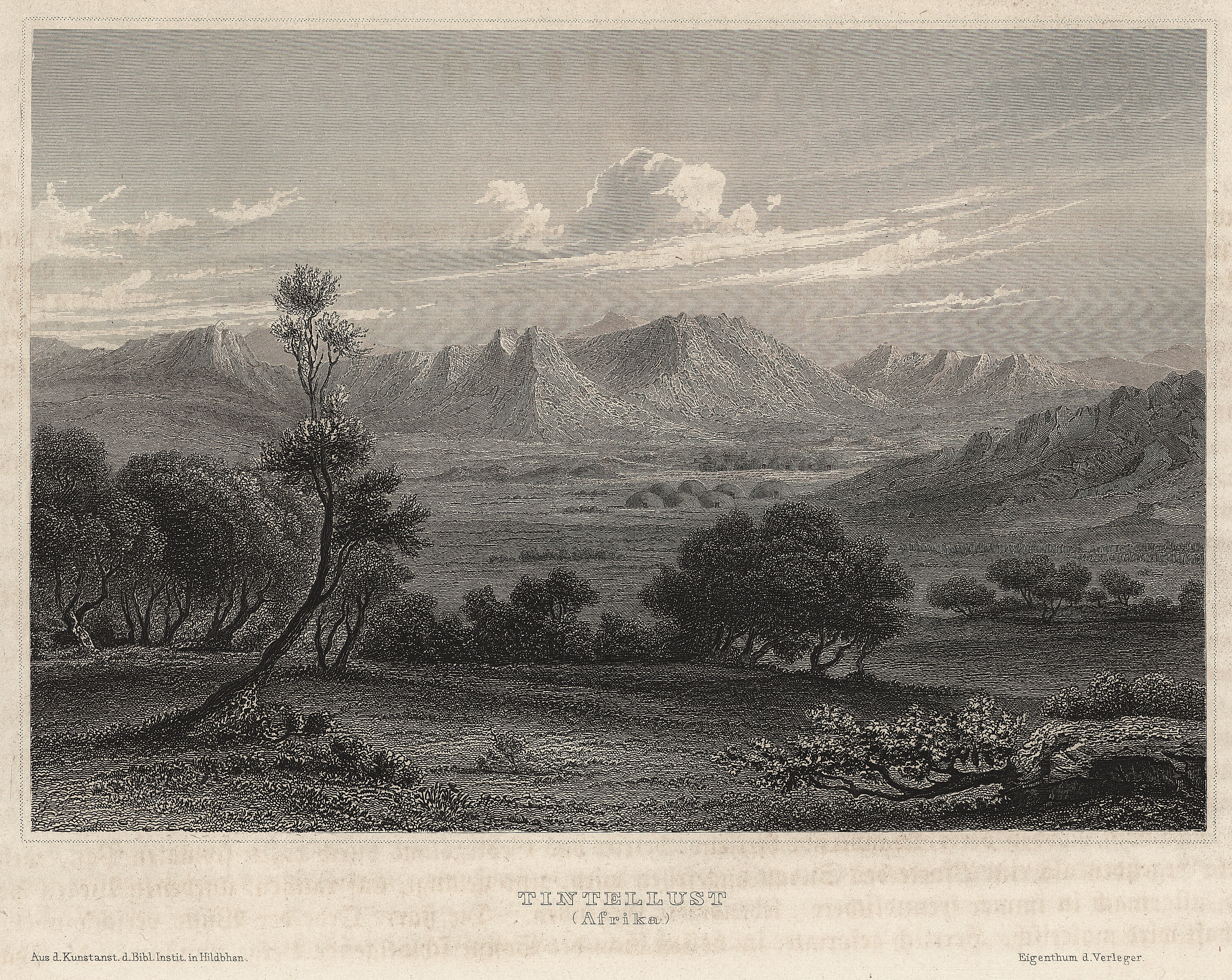
Tchintoulous in the 19th century

Tchintoulous became known in the 19th century as the seat of the influential local ruler Annur, who was visited by the African explorers Heinrich Barth and James Richardson in 1850. At the beginning of the 20th century, Toubou drove the inhabitants away to the city of Agadez. They did not return to the valley until 1942, by which time they had been decimated by diseases. A study conducted in 2025 by the Nigerien government with the support of the United Nations World Food Programme classified Tchintoulous as one of the 1285 locations in Niger that were extremely vulnerable in terms of food security.

== Population ==
In the 2012 census, Tchintoulous had 67 inhabitants living in 16 households. In the 2001 census, the population was 734 in 135 households and in the 1988 census, the population amounted to 371 in 78 households.

The population consists predominantly of the Tuareg subgroup Kel Ewey.

== Economy and infrastructure ==
The Kel Ewey engage in horticulture and livestock farming on a modest scale. Furthermore, Tuareg herders from the Enadan, Kel Aghazan, Kel Eguiga, Kel Tédélé and Kel Wedigui groups use the grazing areas near Tchintoulous year-round. There is a permanent rain gauge.

A health center is available in the village in the form of a Centre de Santé Intégré (CSI). There is a school. In 1996, the Nigerien Ministry of Education, together with the United Nations World Food Programme, established numerous school canteens in zones affected by food insecurity, including one for nomad children in Tchintoulous.
