= Iferouane Department =

Iferouane
- Department
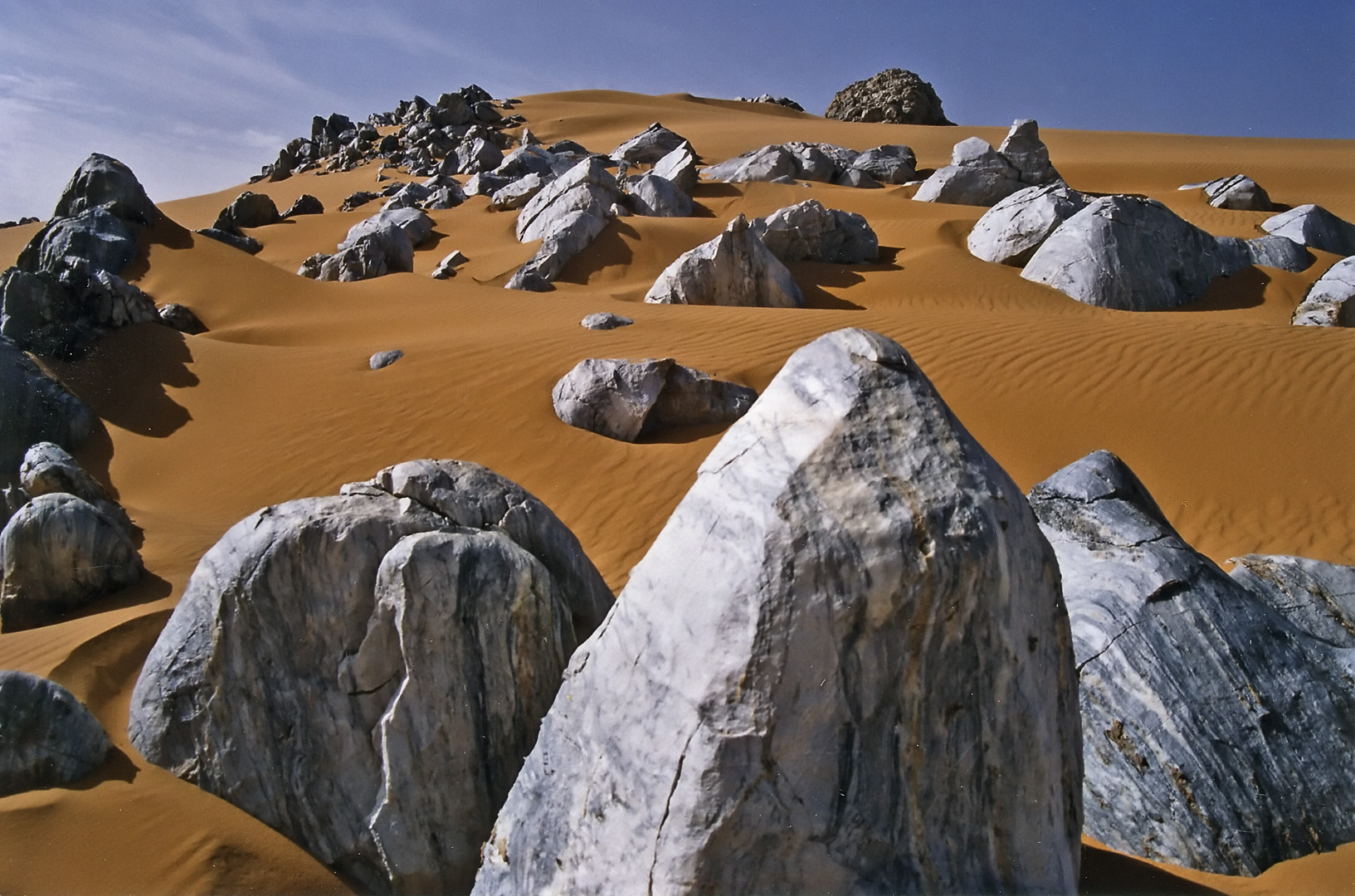
- Landscape
- Interactive map of Iferouane
- Country: Niger
- Region: Agadez Region

Area
  - Total: 53,900 sq mi (139,600 km^{2})

Population (2012)
  - Total: 32,731
  - Density: 0.6073/sq mi (0.2345/km^{2})
- Time zone: UTC+1 (GMT 1)

Iferouane is a department of the Agadez Region in Niger. Its administrative seat is the city of Iferouane. As of 2012, the department had a total population of 32,731 people.

== History ==
The department goes back to the administrative post (poste administratif) of Iférouane, which was established in 1964. In 2011, the administrative post was separated from the department of Arlit and elevated to the department of Iférouane.

== Communes ==
Iferouane Department is divided into two communes, listed with population as of 2012 census:

- Iferouane (13,655)
- Timia (19,076)
