= Tarhmert =

- Location in Niger
- Coordinates: 18°45′N 8°51′E
- Country: Niger
- Region: Agadez Region
- Department: Arlit Department
- Time zone: UTC+1 (WAT)

Tarhmert is a human settlement in the Arlit Department of the Agadez Region of northern-central Niger.
