= Iferouane Airport =

Airport in Niger

- IATA: none; ICAO: DRZI

Summary
- Airport type: Public
- Serves: Iferouane
- Elevation AMSL: 2,162 ft / 659 m
- Coordinates: 19°04′00″N 8°24′55″E

Map
- Location of the airport in Niger

Runways
Direction	Length		Surface
Direction	ft	m	Surface
01/19	4,430	1,350	Dirt
- Source: Google Maps

Iferouane Airport (ICAO: DRZI) is an airport serving the oasis town of Iferouane, in northern Niger. The airport is located just west of the town.

== See also ==
- Transport in Niger
