= Dannet =

- Commune and village
- Location in Niger
- Coordinates: 18°16′03″N 7°18′13″E
- Country: Niger
- Region: Agadez Region
- Department: Arlit Department

Area
  - Total: 4,892 sq mi (12,669 km^{2})

Population (2012)
  - Total: 14,964
  - Density: 3.0592/sq mi (1.1812/km^{2})
- Time zone: UTC+1 (WAT)

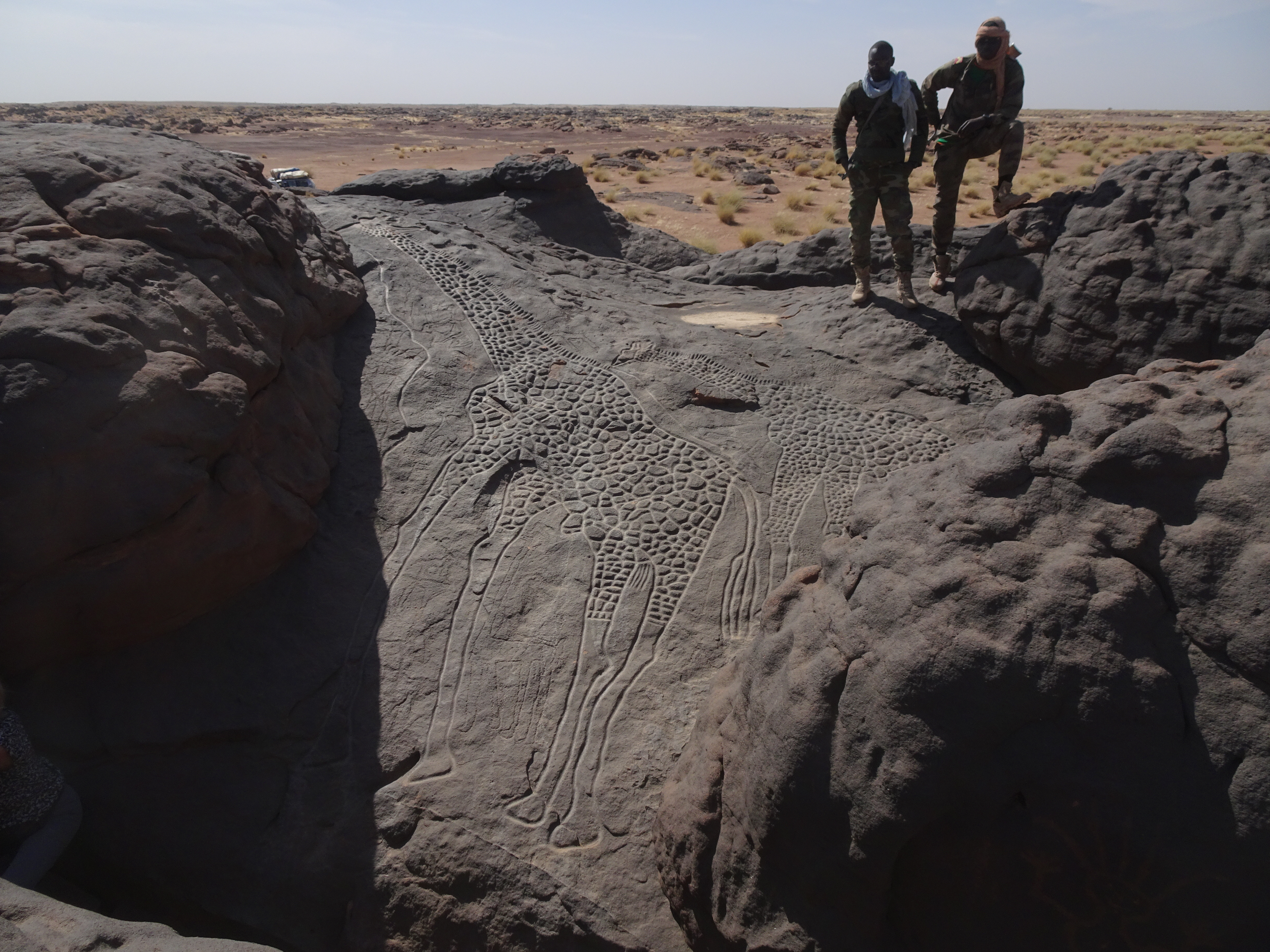
Dannet, 2020

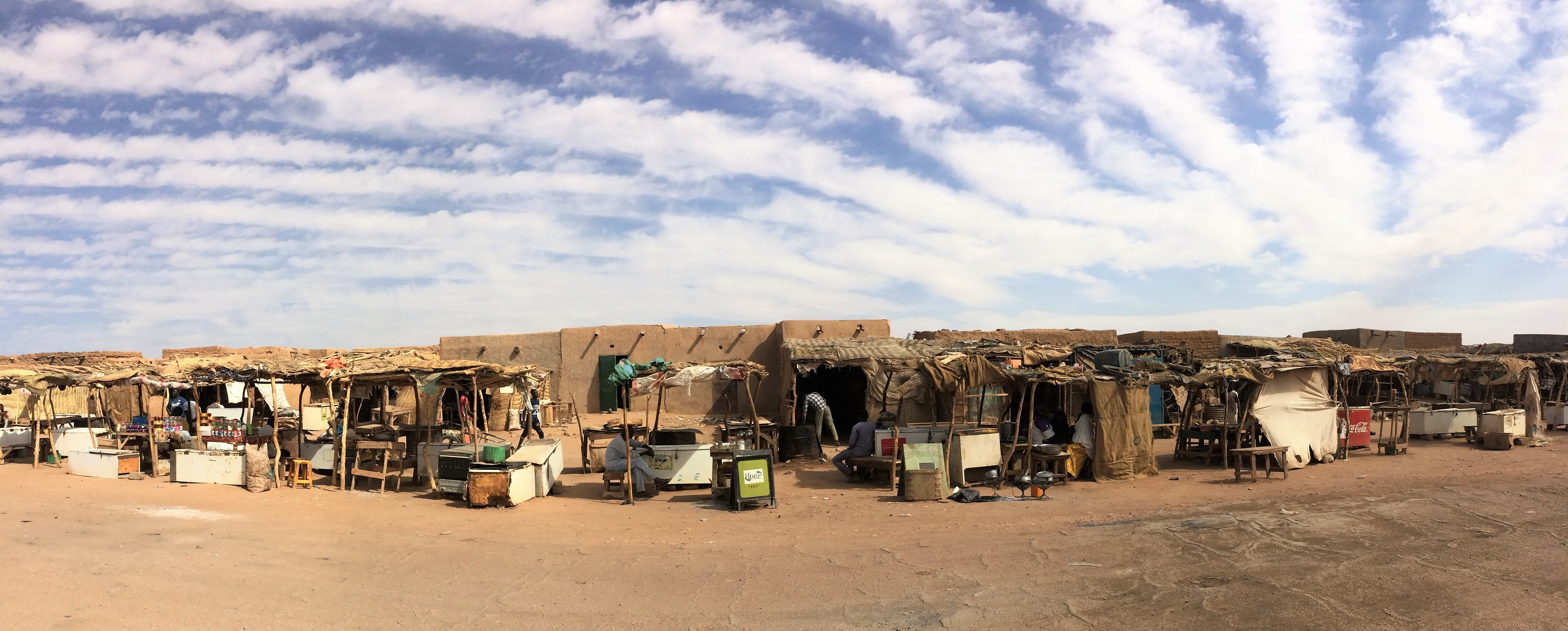
Dannet, 2018

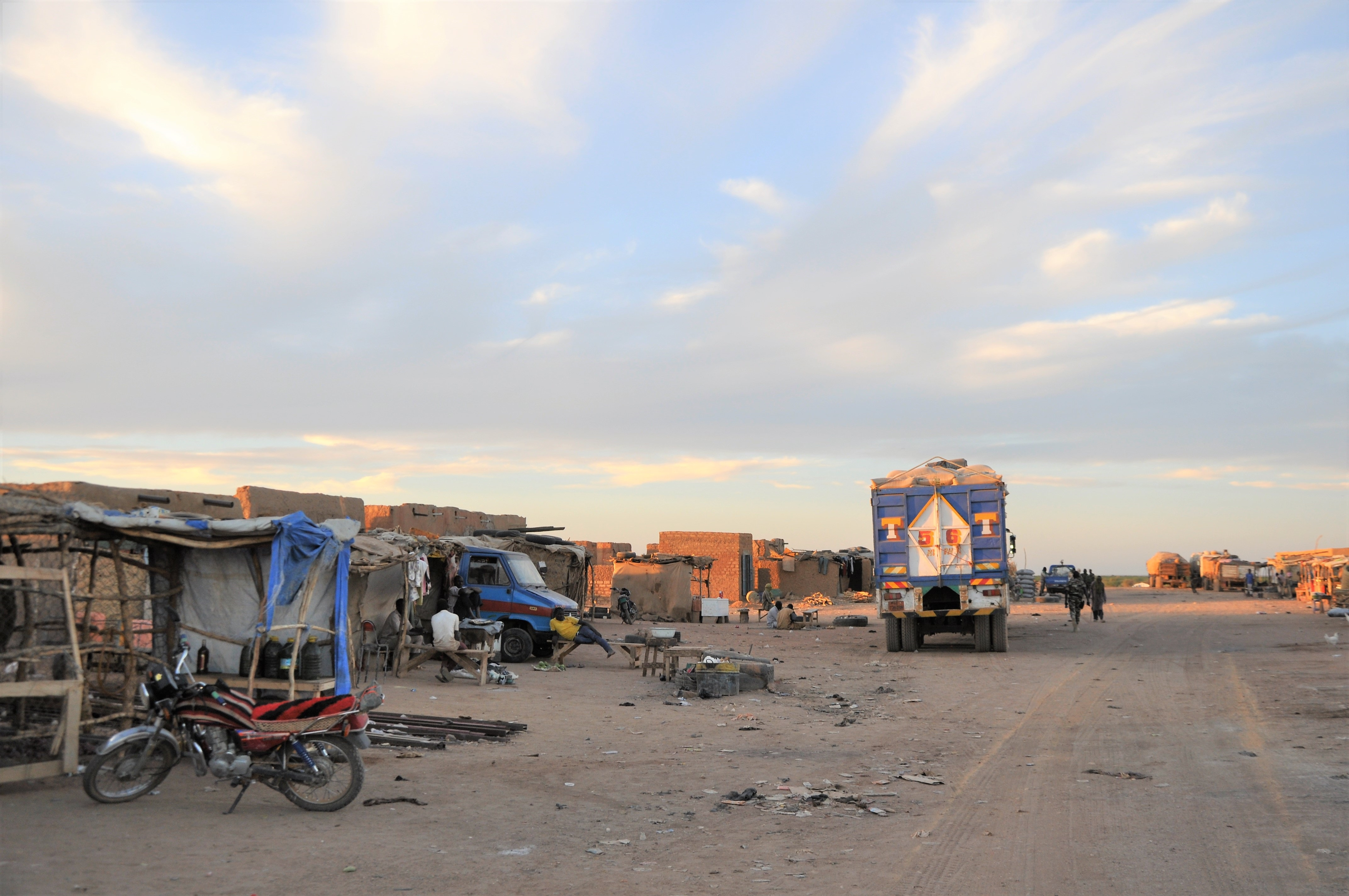
Dannet, 2018

Dannet is a village and rural commune in Niger. As of 2012, the commune had a population of 14,964 people.
