= Sadou Soloké =

Nigerien politician

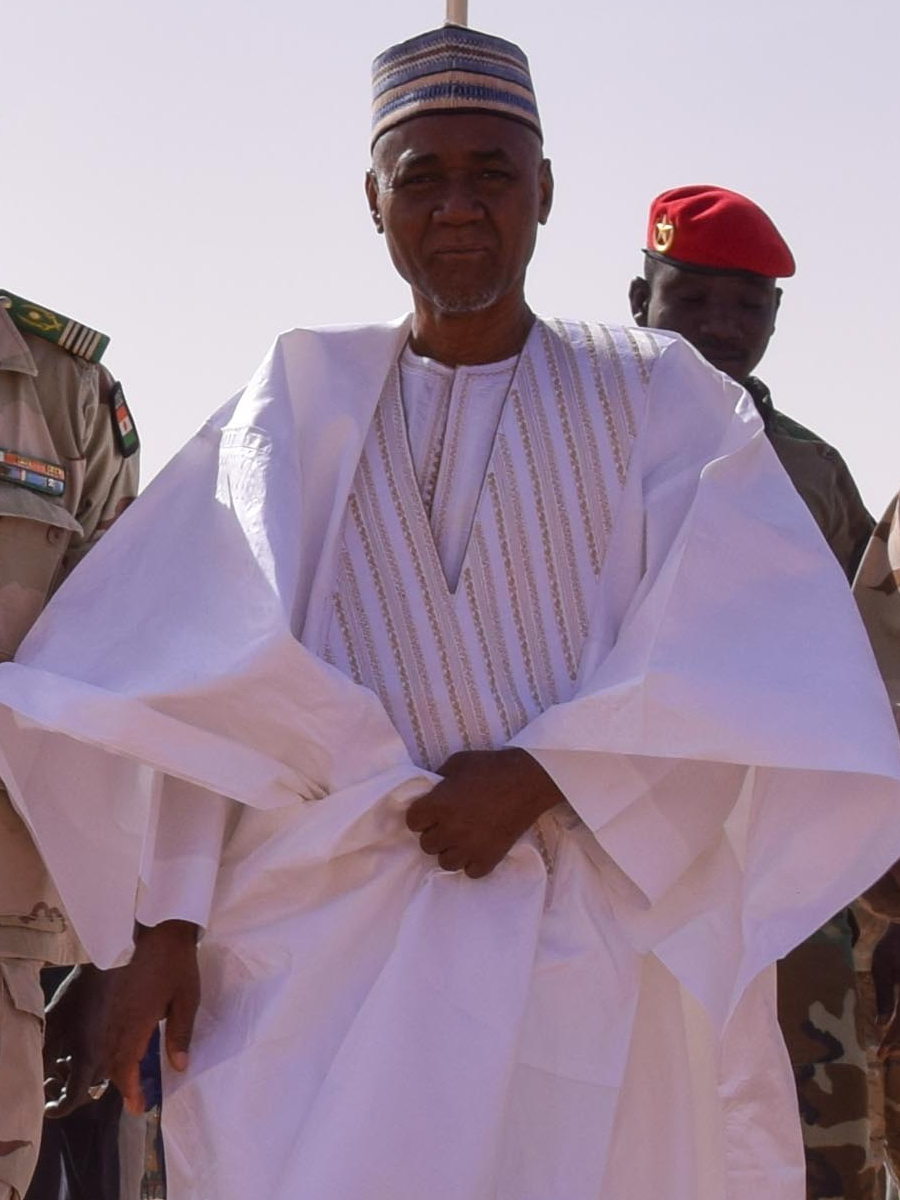
- Sadou Soloké

Governor of Agadez

Sadou Soloké is the Governor of the Agadez Region, Niger.

== Political positions ==
Soloké has stated that the government supports reopening the Djado Plateau for gold mining, with additional regulations.
