= Think aloud protocol =

Method to gather data in usability testing

A think-aloud (or thinking aloud) protocol is a method used to gather data in usability testing in product design and development, in psychology and a range of social sciences (e.g., reading, writing, translation research, decision making, and process tracing).

== Description ==
Think-aloud protocols involve participants thinking aloud as they are performing a set of specified tasks. Participants are asked to say whatever comes into their mind as they complete the task. This might include what they are looking at, thinking, doing, and feeling. This gives observers insight into the participant's cognitive processes (rather than only their final product), to make thought processes as explicit as possible during task performance. In a formal research protocol, all verbalizations are transcribed and then analyzed. In a usability testing context, observers are asked to take notes of what participants say and do, without attempting to interpret their actions and words, and especially noting places where they encounter difficulty. Test sessions may be completed on participants own devices or in a more controlled setting. Sessions are often audio- and video-recorded so that developers can go back and refer to what participants did and how they reacted.

== History ==
The think-aloud method was introduced in the usability field by Clayton Lewis while he was at IBM, and is explained in Task-Centered User Interface Design: A Practical Introduction by Lewis and John Rieman. The method was developed based on the techniques of protocol analysis by K. Ericsson and H. Simon. However, there are some significant differences between the way Ericsson and Simon propose that protocols be conducted and how they are actually conducted by usability practitioners, as noted by Ted Boren and Judith Ramey. These differences arise from the specific needs and context of usability testing; practitioners should be aware of these differences and adjust their method to meet their needs while still collecting valid data. For example, they may need to prompt for additional information more often than Ericsson and Simon would allow, but should take care not to influence what participants say and do.

== Process ==
A typical procedure of think-aloud protocols would include:

- Design the study and write the guide: Determine the number and type of participant for the study. Generally 5 participants would be sufficient. The next step is to write a guide that ask the participants to complete the tasks intended with clear step-by-step instructions. In the script, there should be reminders to participants to say their thoughts out when performing tasks.
- Recruit participants: The team should set up a screener for eligibility of participants. After contacting the person of interest and setting up meeting details such as time and location, the team could also provide additional information to help participant better prepare for the activity.
- Conduct think-aloud protocol: After stating the purpose and asking for consent, the team should proceed by giving instructions to the participant. Ask open-ended questions and follow-up questions. The team should avoid asking leading questions or giving clues.
- Analyze the findings and summarize insights: The team should use notes taken during the sessions to generate insights and to find common patterns. Based on the findings, the design team could then decide directions to take action on.

As Kuusela and Paul state, the think-aloud protocol can be distinguished into two different types of experimental procedures. The first is the concurrent think-aloud protocol, collected during the task. The second is the retrospective think-aloud protocol, gathered after the task as the participant walks back through the steps they took previously, often prompted by a video recording of themselves. There are benefits and drawbacks to each approach, but in general a concurrent protocol may be more complete, while a retrospective protocol has less chance to interfere with task performance. Nonetheless, some concurrent protocols have not produced such interference effects, suggesting that it may be possible to optimize both completeness and authenticity of verbal reports.

== Benefits ==
The think-aloud method allows researchers to discover what users genuinely think of your design.

== Related method ==
A related but slightly different data-gathering method is the talk-aloud protocol. This involves participants only describing their actions but not other thoughts. This method is thought to be more objective in that participants merely report how they go about completing a task rather than interpreting or justifying their actions (see the standard works by Ericsson & Simon).

== See also ==
- Partial concurrent thinking aloud
- Protocol analysis
- Retrospective think aloud
- Rubber duck debugging
