= Tchirozerine Department =

Coordinates: 17°13′20″N 7°37′20″E

Tchirozerine
- Department
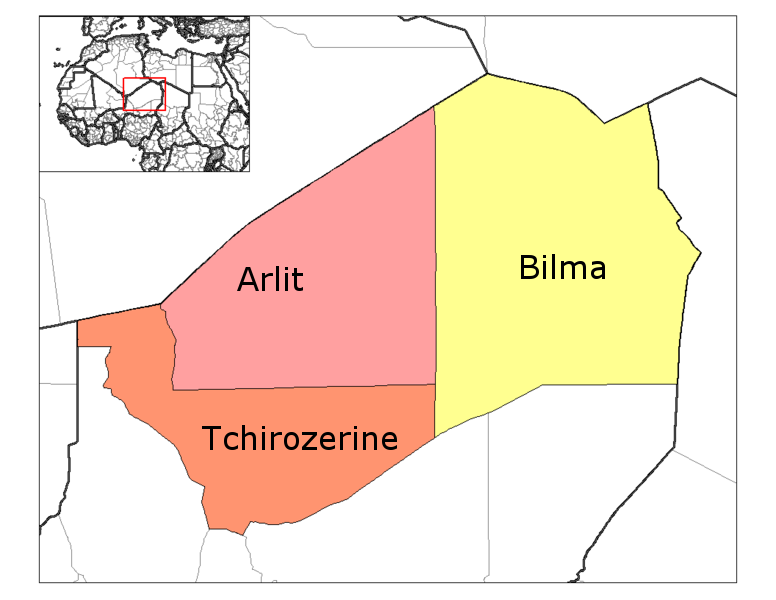
- Tchirozerine Department (2011 borders) location in the region
- Country: Niger
- Region: Agadez Region
- Seat: Tchirozerine

Area
  - Total: 30,960 km^{2} (11,950 sq mi)

Population (2012 census)
  - Total: 244,706
  - Density: 7.904/km^{2} (20.47/sq mi)
- Time zone: UTC+1 (GMT 1)

Tchirozerine is a department of the Agadez Region in Niger. Its capital lies at the city of Tchirozerine. As of 2012, the department had a total population of 244,706 people.

It is divided administratively into the following communes:

- Communes urbaines (urban commune): Tchirozérine, Agadez (the capital of the Agadez Region)
- Communes rurales (rural communes): Dabaga, Tabelot
