= Iferouane =

Oasis town in Agadez Department, Niger

Iférouane Iferouan
- Commune
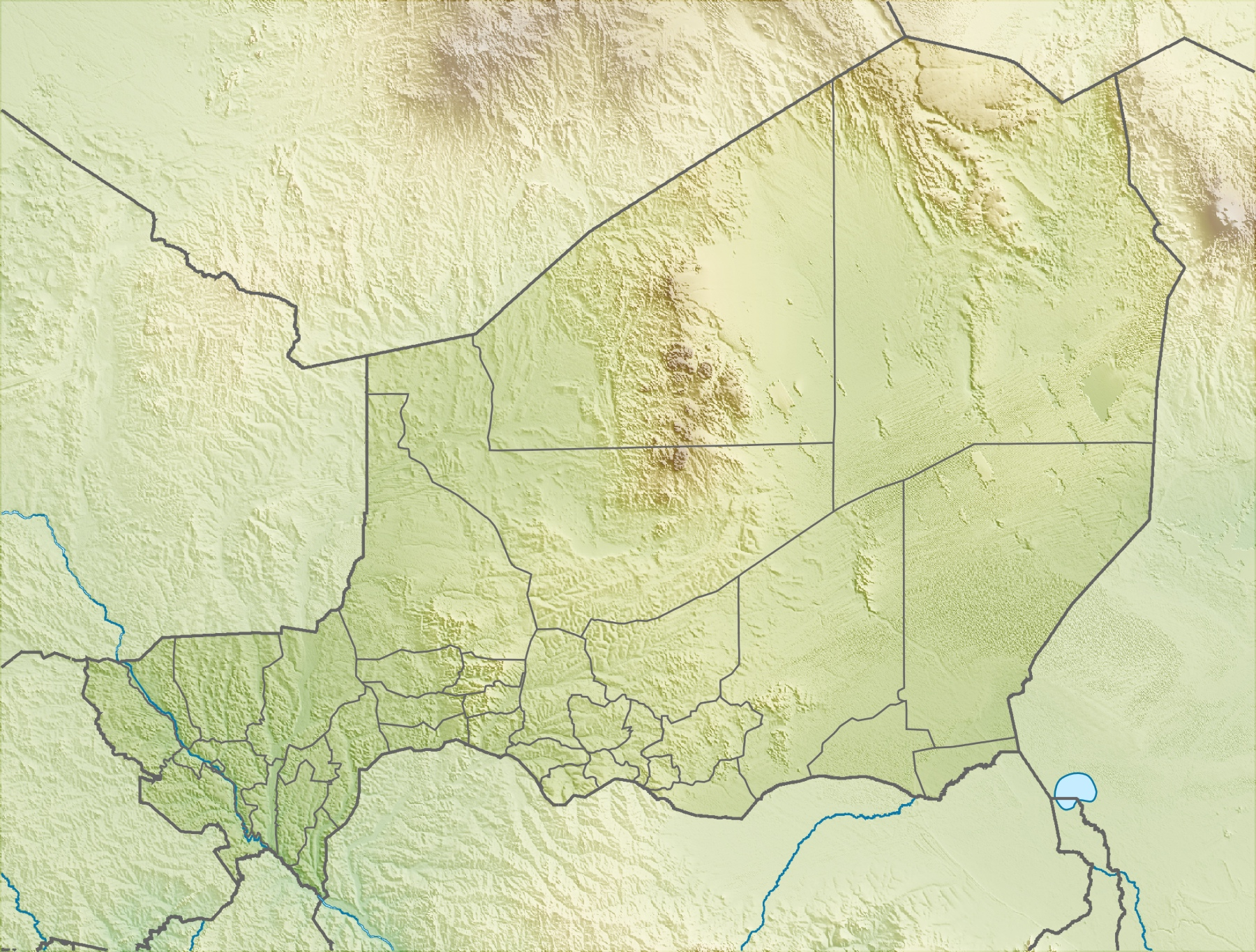
- Location in Niger
- Coordinates: 19°04′05″N 8°25′10″E
- Country: Niger
- Region: Agadez Region
- Department: Arlit Department

Area
  - Commune: 120,288 km^{2} (46,443 sq mi)
- Elevation: 660 m (2,170 ft)

Population (2012)
  - Commune: 13,655
  - Urban: 2,486
  - Summer (DST): UTC+1 (WAT)

Topographic Map of the Aïr mountains. Iférouane is located slightly above the center of the map.

Iferouane (French: Iférouane), also spelled Iferouan, is an oasis town and commune in northern Niger, in Agadez Department. It is located northeast of Arlit in the northern Aïr, in the Ighazar valley near the Tamgak Range.

Iferouane is also the location of the headquarters of the Aïr and Ténéré Natural Reserves, a World Heritage Site covering more than 7,700,000 ha (19,000,000 acres). The Project for the Conservation and Management of the Natural Resources of the Aïr-Ténéré, a joint venture by the government of Niger, the World Conservation Union (IUCN), and the World Wide Fund for Nature (WWF), is also based in Iferouane.

The town is served by Iferouane Airport (ICAO: DRZI).

== History ==
The Foureau–Lamy Mission, a French military expedition led by Fernand Foureau and Amédée-François Lamy, spent a number of months at Iferouane in 1899. The expedition stopped at Iferouane on 24 February 1899 to acquire additional pack animals, their number having dwindled from 1,004 to 585, and departed on 10 June 1899, heading for Agadez. During this time, the expeditionary force faced multiple attacks by Tuaregs and saw the size of its caravan dwindle from 585 camels to 75.

During Niger's colonial period, Iferouane was the northernmost military outpost in the French colony. In 1964, a few years after independence, the population of Iferouane cercle was approximately 10,000.

=== Second Tuareg Rebellion ===
Iferouane was the site of the first attack carried out by the Niger Movement for Justice (MNJ), which marked the beginning of the Second Tuareg Rebellion. Numerous clashes between rebel and government forces subsequently took place near the town, including an attack in early December 2007 against a supply convoy heading for Iferouane that resulted in the deaths of three soldiers and, according to the government, eight rebels. In October 2007, the president of the SOS Iférouane Initiative, a local organisation involved with delivering supplies to the town, reported that due to the insecurity caused by the rebellion, the residents of Iferouane had been without food for a number of weeks. He also reported an increase in the incidence of malaria and diarrhoea among the town's residents.

In November, Iferouane's deputy mayor reported that the town's entire population – approximately 5,000 residents – had left due to shortages of food, the Tuareg rebellion, and "harassment" by the army. The central government, based in Niamey, confirmed that supplies to the town were blocked due to the mining of roads by rebels, but denied that the town had been emptied.

In November 2008, a Radio France International reporter visited the town and described it as "empty of inhabitants", with the entire population having fled to Arlit or Agadez. During 2009, the displaced inhabitants started to return and by September, about 90% of the population had returned and agriculture had resumed, despite the damaged infrastructure. The easing of the conflict in 2009 as well as the challenging living conditions where they had been displaced to factored greatly in the decision of former Iferouane residents to return.

== Climate ==
Iferouane receives, on average, in excess of 50 mm of rainfall per year, which falls in the course of a few heavy downpours during the summer months. Mean rainfall per annum was 58.2 mm (2.29 in) from 1940 to 1989, and 76.1 mm (3.00 in) between 1990 and 2004. Temperatures as low as −1 °C (30 °F) and as high as 52 °C (126 °F) have been recorded.

== See also ==
- Aouderas
- Timia
- Tchintoulous
- Uranium mining
