= Days of Innocence (Rita album) =

1988 studio album by Rita

Studio album by Rita
- Released: 1988

Rita chronology
Breaking Those Walls (1987)	Days of Innocence (1988)	Great Love (1994)

Days of Innocence (Hebrew: ימי התום; Yemei ha-tom) is the third studio album by Israeli singer Rita. It was released in 1988 and was certified gold five times, with many songs reaching the top of the charts in Israel. The biggest hit from this album was "Ani Khaya Li Mi'Yom LeYom" ("I Live from Day to Day"). The album also included a Hebrew vocal interpretation of Joaquin Rodrigo's Concierto de Aranjuez entitled "Shir HaQeshet" ("Song of the Rainbow").

== Track listing ==
Sourced from Rita's official website and Spotify.

No.	Title	Length
1.	"בוא" (Bo / Come On)	4:47
2.	"חברה" (Khavera / Friend)	5:41
3.	"עטוף ברחמים" ('At'uf BeRakhamim / Wrapped in Pity)	5:14
4.	"אני חיה לי מיום ליום" (Ani Khaya Li MiYom LeYom / I Live from Day to Day)	4:04
5.	"שיר לילדים החדשים" (Shir LaYeladim HaKhadashim / A Song for the New Children)	3:02
6.	"נוצה ברוח" (Notza BaRuakh / Feather in the Wind)	3:11
7.	"כמו בתמונה" (Kmo BiTmuna / Like in the Picture)	4:46
8.	"הנסיכה והרוח" (HaNesikha VeHaRuakh / The Princess and the Spirit)	5:42
9.	"הקונצרטו לארנחואז (שיר הקשת)" (Shir haQeshet / Concierto de Aranjuez (Rainbow Song))	3:53
10.	"ימי התום" (Yemey HaTom / Days of Innocence)	4:05
11.	"העלמות אסורה" (He'almut HaAsura / Disappearance is Forbidden)	4:40
12.	"תחת ירח ערבי" (Under an Arab Moon)	3:48
Total length:		52:58
