= Tchirozerine =

- Commune and town
- Location in Niger
- Coordinates: 17.1054°N 7.8281°E
- Country: Niger
- Region: Agadez Region
- Department: Tchirozerine Department

Area
  - Total: 3,497 sq mi (9,057 km^{2})
- Elevation: 1,670 ft (510 m)

Population (2012 census)
  - Total: 63,503
  - Density: 18.16/sq mi (7.011/km^{2})
- Time zone: UTC+1 (WAT)

Tchirozerine is a town and urban commune in Niger. As of 2012, the commune's population was 63,503.

== Economy ==
Nearby Tchirozerine is the Anou Araren mining area. The state company SONICHAR, established in 1975, has produced coal in an open pit mine since 1980. The production, 246,558 tonnes in 2010, is almost entirely used on site in a power plant, operated by the same company, to power the uranium processing plants of Arlit and Akokan and for the main cities of the Agadez region.
