= Rami Kleinstein =

Israeli singer and composer (born 1962)

Rami Kleinstein רָמִי קלינשטיין
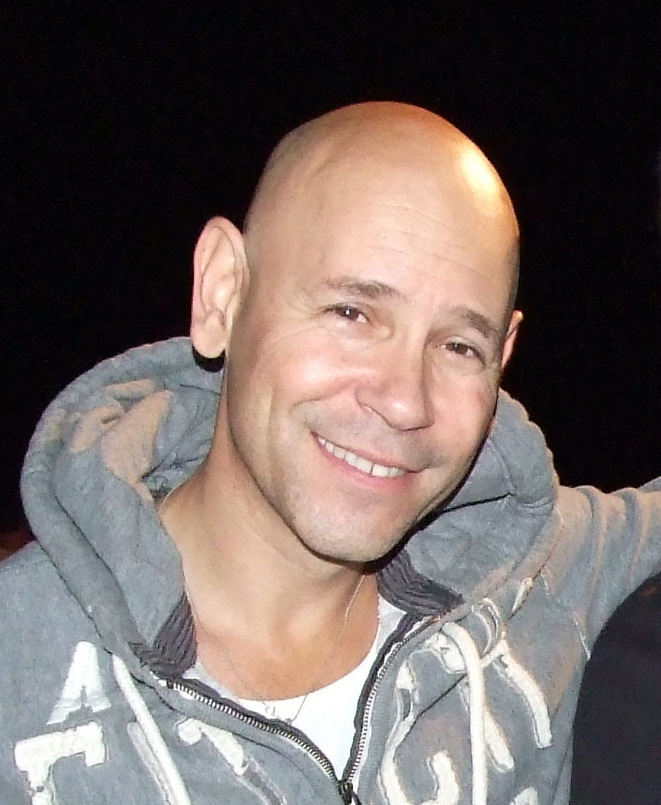
- Kleinstein in 2008

Background information
- Born: November 10, 1962 (age 63); New York City, United States
- Origin: Israel
- Genres: Pop; rock
- Years active: 1978–present
- Labels: Hed Arzi Music; Helicon
- Spouse: Rita Yahan-Farouz (m. 1988; sep. 2007)
- Website: www.facebook.com/ramikleinstein.music
- Military career
- Allegiance: State of Israel
- Branch: Israel Defense Forces
- Service years: 1980–1983

Rami Kleinstein (Hebrew: רָמִי קלינשטיין; born 10 November 1962) is an Israeli singer and composer.

== Early and personal life ==
Kleinstein was born in New York City to a family of Ashkenazi Jews in 1962. In 1968, they immigrated to Israel. After a year, the family moved back to the United States before returning to Israel in 1970. As a child, he studied piano and classical music after his parents recognized his musical talent and decided to have him trained to be a classical pianist. In his mid-teens, he met and began dating Israeli future singer Rita. During his compulsory Israeli military service in the early 1980s, he performed with Rita while they were both military band members. Kleinstein subsequently composed and produced many of Rita's songs. The two married in 1988 and had two daughters Meshi Kleinstein born 1992 and Noam Kleinstein born 2001. They legally separated in 2007.

== Career ==
In 1986, Rami's first solo album ביום של הפצצה (transl. "On the day of the bomb") achieved gold status. In 1997, his sixth album כל מה שתרצי (transl. "Everything you want") reached triple platinum status within ten days of release. He was voted "Singer of the Year" in 1995, after his album תפוחים ותמרים (transl. "Apples and dates") reached triple platinum.

Since 1985, Rami has been composing, arranging, and accompanying Rita. He has written music for lyrics by American singer Bob Dylan as well as Israeli artists Ehud Banai and Hanoch Levin.

== Discography ==
- 1986: ביום של הפצצה ("On the day of the bomb")
- 1989: על הגשר הישן ("On the old bridge")
- 1991: אהביני ("My love")
- 1993: במסיבה אצל גידו ("At Gido's party")
- 1995: תפוחים ותמרים ("Apples and dates")
- 1997: כל מה שתרצי ("Everything you want")
- 2000: פטר והזאב וקרנבל החיות ("Peter and the wolf and the carnival of animals")
- 2000: תגיד את זה ("Say it")
- 2005: הרבה פנים ("Many faces")
- 2009: שיר חשוף ("Bare song")
- 2009: סינרגיה אקוסטית (with Synergia) ("Acoustic Synergia")
- 2010: Live
- 2012: סיטואציה מורכב ("Complex situation")
- 2014: מתנות קטנות ("Small gifts")
- 2015: אנשים טובים ("Good people")

== See also ==
- Music of Israel
  - List of Israeli musical artists
  - Israeli rock
- Ashkenazi Jews
  - American Jews
