= Protocol analysis =

Protocol analysis is a psychological research method that elicits verbal reports from research participants. Protocol analysis is used to study thinking in cognitive psychology (Crutcher, 1994), cognitive science (Simon & Kaplan, 1989), and behavior analysis (Austin & Delaney, 1998). It has found further application in the design of surveys and interviews (Sudman, Bradburn & Schwarz, 1996), usability testing (Henderson, Smith, Podd, & Varela-Alvarez, 1995), educational psychology (Pressley & Afflerbach 1995; Renkl, 1997) and design research (Gero & McNeill 1998). With the introduction of video- and audio-based surveys, the scale and scope of verbal report collection is increased dramatically compared to in-person verbal report recording (Byrd, Joseph, Gongora, & Sirota 2023).

== See also ==
- Content analysis
- Partial concurrent thinking aloud
- Think aloud protocol
