= Santa Rita, California =

Santa Rita, California may refer to:

- Santa Rita, Salinas, California
- Santa Rita, Santa Barbara County, California
- Sta. Rita Hills AVA, California wine region in Santa Barbara County
- Santa Rita Jail, a county jail in Alameda County
