= Rita (Israeli singer) =

Israeli singer and actress (born 1962)

- ריטה
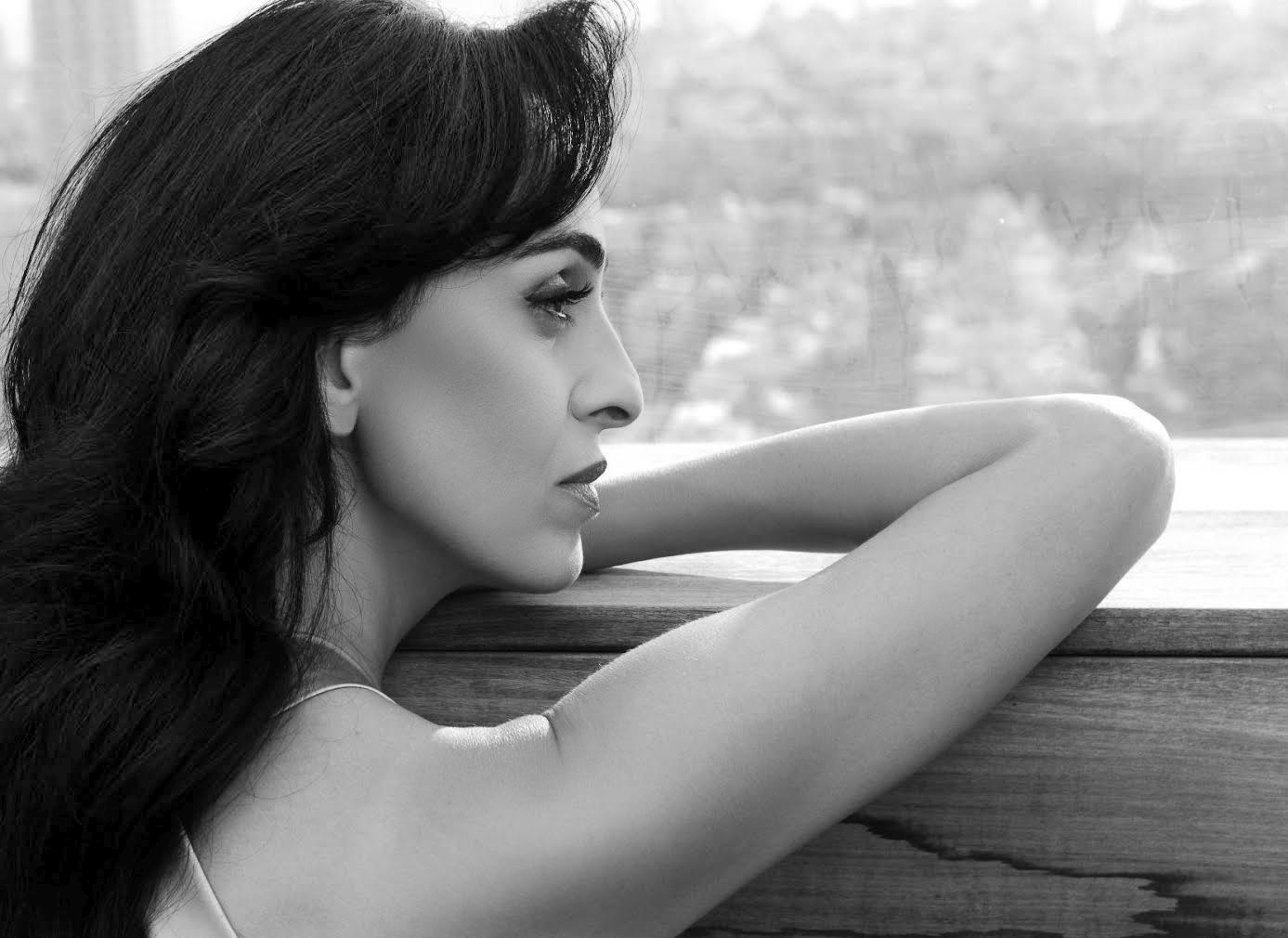
- Rita in 2014
- Born: Rita Jahan-Farouz; 24 March 1962 (age 64); Tehran, Iran
- Citizenship: Israeli
- Known for: 2x Israeli Singer of the Year; represented Israel in the 1990 Eurovision Song Contest
- Notable work: Albums Rita and Yamey Ha-Tom (Days of Innocence)
- Spouse: Rami Kleinstein (m. 1988; sep. 2007)
- Children: 2
- Relatives: Liraz Charhi (niece)
- Musical career
- Genres: Rock; soul; pop; folk; Hebrew; Persian
- Occupations: Singer; actress
- Years active: 1986–present
- Labels: Hed Arzi Music; Helicon; Knaʽan
- Military career
- Allegiance: State of Israel
- Branch: Israel Defense Forces
- Service years: 1980–1982

Rita Jahan-Farouz (Note: Formerly Rita Kleinstein (Hebrew: ריטה קלינשטיין) during her marriage with Rami Kleinstein.) (Hebrew: ריטה ג'האן-פרוז; Persian: ریتا جهان‌فروز), known mononymously as Rita, is an Iranian-born Israeli singer and actress.

In both 1988 and 1989, she was chosen as Singer of the Year by Israel's national radio station. Rita represented Israel in the 1990 Eurovision Song Contest.

In 2011 and 2012, Rita became famous in Iran after the release of various pop records in which she sings in her childhood native Persian language. While her music is banned in Iran, which filters the Internet, fans in Iran have downloaded or bought bootleg copies of her albums. In 2022, Rita voiced her support for the Mahsa Amini protests in Iran. She has acted in the theater and in film, and has an acting role as the mother of the protagonist in the 2025 film, Reading Lolita in Tehran, based on the Iranian memoir of the same name.

Rita has released 12 studio albums, including Rita (4× Platinum), Yamey Ha-Tom (Days of Innocence) (5× Gold), Ahava Gdola (A Great Love) (4× Platinum), Tiftah Halon (Open a Window) (2× Platinum), and Remazim (Hints) (Platinum), and sold over a million albums.

== Early and personal life ==
Rita was born in Tehran, Iran, to a family of Persian Jews in 1962. In 1970, when she was eight years old, they immigrated to Israel, settling down in the city of Ramat HaSharon. Her niece is Israeli actress and singer Liraz Charhi.

During her compulsory military service in the early 1980s, she began singing professionally as a musical band member, and rose to stardom quickly. In 1988, Rita married Israeli singer and composer Rami Kleinstein, with whom she has two daughters, Meshi Kleinstein born 1992 and Noam Kleinstein born 2001. The couple performed together in 2001. In 2007, they announced that they were separating.

== Career ==
=== 1980–89; two-time Singer of the Year ===
Rita began her career in 1980 as part of a musical troupe in the Israel Defense Forces. In 1982, she attended the Beit Zvi School for the Performing Arts, and Theater in Ramat Gan. Her first exposure to the general public in Israel was at the 1986 Pre-Eurovision Song Contest (known as the Kdam-Eurovision), which decided who would represent Israel in the upcoming Eurovision Song Contest. Rita did not win, but her song, Shvil haBrichah (“The Escape Path”) garnered a great deal of interest.

That same year, Rita starred in a production of the musical My Fair Lady. She also released her self-titled debut album, Rita, which went triple platinum, selling over 120,000 copies. In 1987, she released the English-language album Breaking Those Walls under the name of Rita Farouz. That album contained several English versions of her Hebrew songs from the first album as well as original material. Despite going gold (20,000 copies) in Israel, that album was not an international success.

In 1988, Rita released her third album, Days of Innocence (Yemei Ha'Tom), which was produced by her then-husband, Rami Kleinstein, and which included a song by Israeli playwright Hanoch Levin.

In both 1988 and 1989 she was chosen as Singer of the Year by Israel's national radio station.

=== 1990–99; Eurovision ===
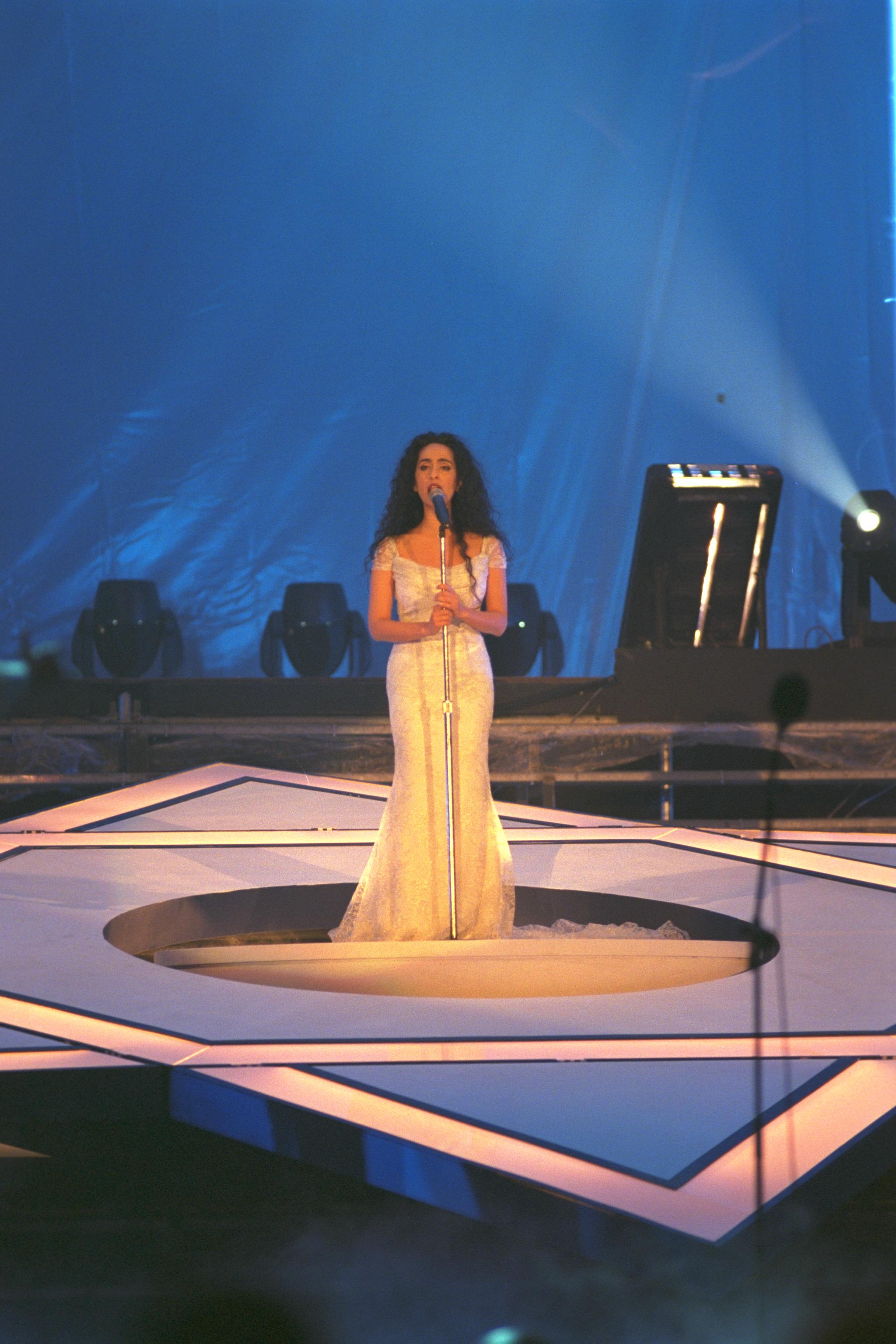
Rita singing Hatikvah at a jubilee event marking Israel's 50th Independence Day (1998)

Rita represented Israel in the 1990 Eurovision Song Contest singing Shara Barkhovot ("Singing in the Streets"), and came in 18th place. After a brief hiatus, Rita returned in 1994 with her third album, Ahava Gedola (A Great Love), which led to a three-year tour around the country. Tahanot Bazman (Stations in Time) was released in 1996, consisting mainly of previously unreleased material.

In 1995, Rita voiced Pocahontas in the Hebrew-dubbed version of the animated Disney musical film Pocahontas, including the songs. In 1998, Rita was invited to sing the Israeli national anthem Hatikvah ("The Hope") at Israel's jubilee celebration Paamonei ha'yovel (The Jubilee Bells). There was a minor uproar concerning her fee, which was deemed exorbitant by some, but she was convinced to appear following a call from Prime Minister Benjamin Netanyahu. She reportedly donated the money to charity.

In 1999, Rita released Tiftakh Halon (Open a Window). Her song, "Bo (your soul)" was featured prominently in the 2002 Israeli romantic drama film, Yossi & Jagger.

=== 2000–09; 7th album ===
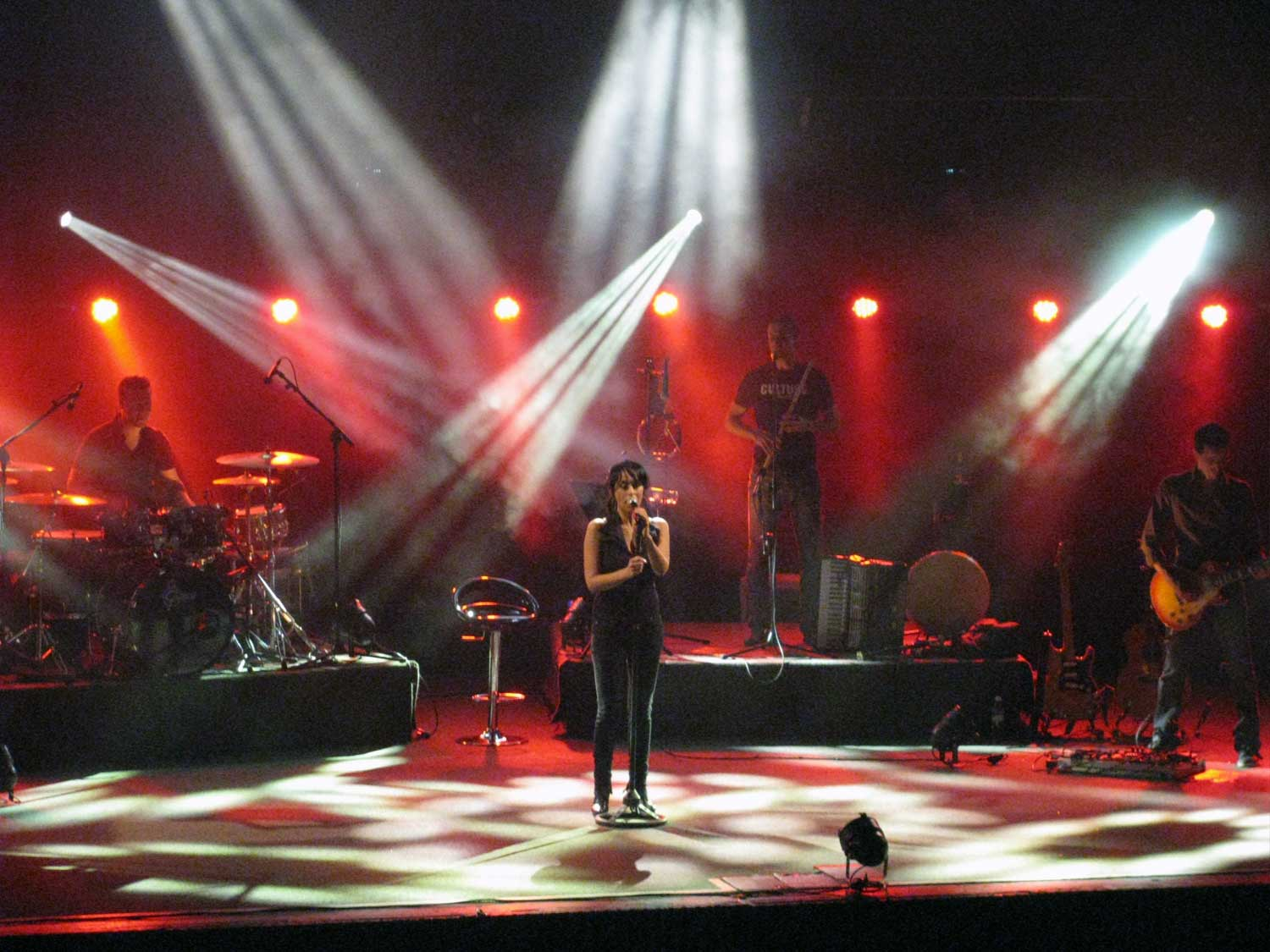
Rita performing at a concert in Jerusalem (2009)

She released Hamtzan (Oxygen) in 2003. In 2004, Rita played the role of Roxie Hart in an adaptation of the musical Chicago for the Beit Lessin Theater in Tel Aviv.

In 2006, Rita appeared in a show called One (in English) which ran for a month at the Israel Trade Fairs & Convention Center in Tel Aviv. Choreographed by Mitch Sebastian, it included lasers, flamethrowers, 3-D images, smoke machines and 40 dancers, acrobats, and actors. Over 100,000 tickets were sold.

In 2008, Rita released her 7th album, Remazim (Clues), her first in five years.

=== 2010–present; Reading Lolita in Tehran ===
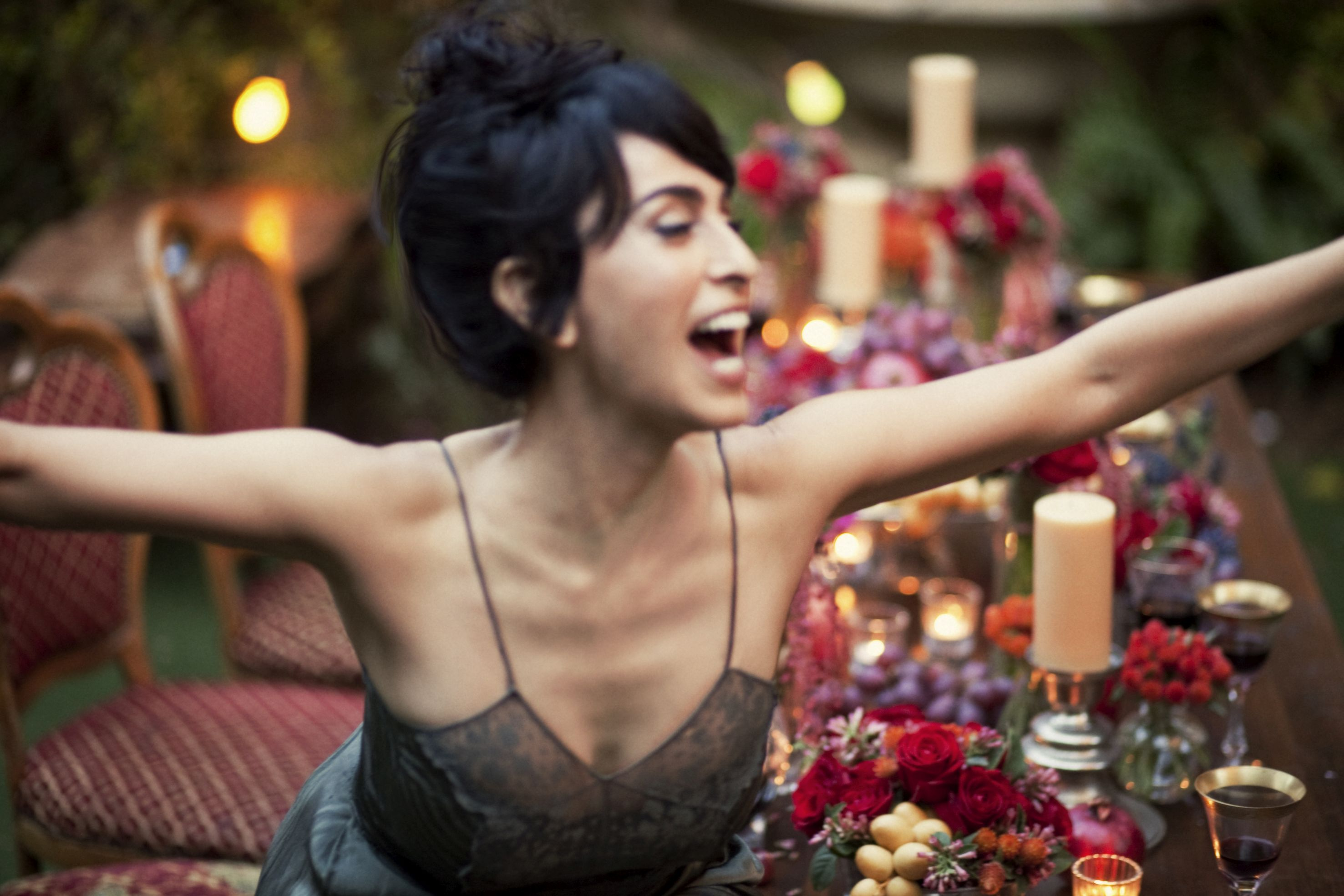
Rita in 2011

In 2010 she performed at the President's Residence in Jerusalem in the presence of Italian prime minister Silvio Berlusconi and Israeli president Shimon Peres. Rita sang her musical version of Hayim Nahman Bialik's poem Hachnisini tachat knafekh ("Put me under your wings"), and an aria in Italian.

In 2011, Rita became famous in Iran after the release of various pop records in which she sings in her childhood native Persian language, which she speaks fluently, on 22 June 2011 she introduced the single "Shaneh", based on traditional Persian folk music, but modernized with a more pop and techno dance beat. Iranians of all ages responded "overwhelmingly," including sending her emails and writing on her Facebook page.

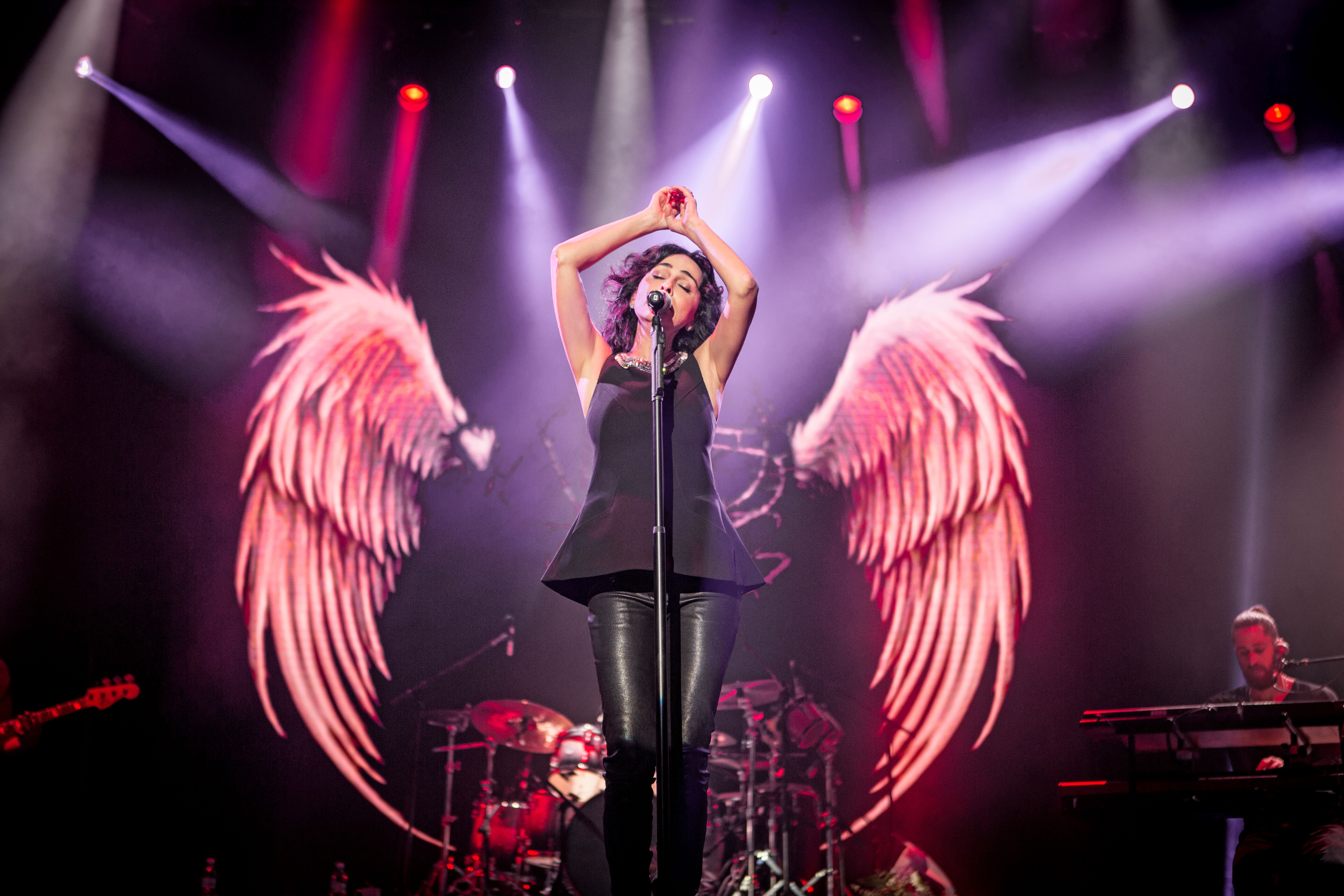
Rita in 2015

Most Westernized popular music, including hers, is banned in Iran, which filters the Internet. However, fans in Iran have downloaded or bought bootleg copies of her albums.

In 2012 Rita released her album All My Joys, also in Persian, and Iranians living in other countries flooded her recording studio with positive messages. It was also popular in Israel, and was certified gold in Israel within three weeks of its release. She has since been commonly referred to as a cultural ambassador between Israelis and Iranians, and has said that she hopes to "puncture the wall of tension" between the two countries.

Despite her popularity in Iran, the Islamic Revolutionary Guard Corps-affiliated Fars News Agency called her music a "plot" to win over the hearts and minds of Iranians and part of Israel's "soft war" against Iran. She was also criticized by government hardliners for sending good wishes to Iranians for Nowruz, the Iranian New Year, and saying "I hope that we all live alongside each other by dancing and singing."

As of 2013, Rita had released 12 studio albums, and sold over a million albums.

Her debut novel Rain-Soaked Chador was published in 2021. It describes a family saga in Iran and Israel.

In 2022, Rita voiced her support for the Mahsa Amini protests in Iran, saying "It is very important for me as a woman to support those women in Iran." Commenting on the Israeli people and the Iranian people, she said: "The time will come when we can be in friendship. We have no reason to be enemies."

In 2022 Rita was honored as one of the torchbearers in the national Israeli Independence Day ceremony.

Rita has an acting role as the mother of the protagonist in the 2025 film, Reading Lolita in Tehran, directed by Eran Riklis and based on the Iranian memoir of the same name by Azar Nafisi.

== Documentary ==
In 2013, a documentary entitled Rita Jahan Foruz about her album in Persian was directed by Ayal Goldberg. It was shown at Lincoln Center in New York City during the 2014 New York Jewish Film Festival. In Australia, it was shown in Melbourne, Sydney, Canberra, Adelaide, and Perth during the 2014 Australia Israel Cultural Exchange (AICE) Israeli Film Festival.

== Discography ==
=== Studio albums ===
- 1986: Rita (4× Platinum)
- 1987: Breaking Those Walls (Gold)
- 1988: Yamey Ha-Tom (Days of Innocence) (5× Gold)
- 1994: Ahava Gdola (A Great Love) (4× Platinum)
- 1999: Tiftah Halon (Open a Window) (2× Platinum)
- 2000: Time For Peace (Gold)
- 2003: Hamtsan (Oxygen) (Gold)
- 2008: Remazim (Hints) (Platinum)
- 2011: HaSmachot Sheli (My Joys) (Gold)
- 2015: Heaven Sent
- 2017: Nisim Shqufim (Transparent Miracles)
- 2024: Duende (with ELK)

=== Compilation albums ===
- 1996: Tahanot BaZman (Stages in Time) (2× Platinum)
- 2015: Rita - haOsef (Rita: The Collection)

=== Live album ===
- 1998: Ahava Gdola - Hahofaa (A Great Love - The Show)
- 2001: Rita & Rami On Stage (5× Gold)
- 2007: ONE (Live) (Gold)

Awards and achievements
Preceded by Gili & Galit with Derekh Hamelekh	Israel in the Eurovision Song Contest; 1990	Succeeded by Duo Datz with Kan

== See also ==
- Music of Israel
  - List of Israeli musical artists
- Mizrahi Jews
  - Persian Jews
- List of Iranian women

== Sources ==
- Friedman, Motti. "Rita." The Department for Jewish Zionist Education website, retrieved 19 August 2006.
- Griver, Simon. "The Ingathering of the Exiles." Israel Ministry of Foreign Affairs web site, retrieved 25 March 2005.
- Hartog, Kelly. "Diva Sings Out About Her Tour, Fans". The Jewish Journal of Greater Los Angeles, 4 January 2005. Retrieved 25 March 2005.
- Pri, Tal. "Behind the Curtains of 'Chicago'" (in Hebrew). nrg Maariv, retrieved 25 March 2005.
