= Rita (Rita Yahan-Farouz album) =

1986 album by Rita Yahan-Farouz

Rita is the 1986 debut album of Israeli singer Rita Yahan-Farouz.

It went quadruple platinum and established her as a popular singer in Israel. Following its release it became the best-selling debut album of an Israeli musician. Rita wrote the lyrics for three songs. The album is largely a "collection of slow numbers", many of them piano-based songs written by her then-husband Rami Kleinstein, co-produced with Reuven Shapira and Naor Dayan.

== Track listing ==
No.	Title	Length
1.	"עבד של הזמן"	4:49
2.	"שיר אהובת הספן"	4:14
3.	"שביל הבריחה"	3:17
4.	"הכניסיני תחת כנפך"	4:35
5.	"משחק מכור"	4:18
6.	"לבכות"	4:16
7.	"בגידה"	4:40
8.	"עוד איש בודד"	4:26
9.	"לקבל ולתת"	3:16
10.	"לך"	4:46
