= Queensland Building and Construction Commission =

The Queensland Building and Construction Commission (QBCC) is a Queensland Government statutory body responsible for regulating the building and construction industry in Queensland, Australia. The commission was established to ensure compliance with building laws and regulations, protect consumers, and promote fair trading practices.

== History ==
The QBCC was created through the Queensland Building and Construction Commission Act 1991 (QBCC Act), which replaced the previous regulatory framework. The new legislation aimed to improve efficiency, reduce costs, and enhance consumer protection in the building and construction industry.

== Responsibilities ==
As the statutory body that oversees all building and construction work in Queensland, the QBCC has responsibilities to the building and construction industry, to consumers and to the general public. These responsibilities include:

=== Building and Construction Industry ===
- Licensing tradespersons and certifiers working in building and construction
- Monitoring and enforcing building codes and standards including regulating building product supply chains
- Investigating complaints and disputes related to building and construction work
- monitoring and protecting the financial wellbeing of the building and construction industry
- monitoring and enforcing compliance with building codes and standards to protect the public from poor quality building work in Queensland
- monitoring and enforcing compliance with legislative obligations relating to building and construction work including payment obligations

=== Consumers ===
- Providing consumer protection and advocacy services
- providing dispute resolution services in relation to defective building work
- managing the Queensland Home Warranty Scheme for eligible residential construction work
- adjudication and advisory services.

=== General Public ===
- providing education about building and construction laws in Queensland
- administering programs to identify the large use of non-compliant building material such as the Safer Buildings program which identies combustible cladding on private buildings.

== Legislation ==
The QBCC is the administering department for several Queensland statutes. These include the:

- Queensland Building and Construction Commission Act 1991
  - Queensland Building and Construction Commission Regulation 2018
  - Queensland Building and Construction Commission (Minimum Financial Requirements) Regulation 2018
  - Queensland Building and Construction Commission (Non-Conforming Building Products Code of Practice) 2017
- Building Act 1975
  - Building Regulation 2021
- Building Industry Fairness (Security of Payment) Act 2017
  - Building Industry Fairness (Security of Payment) Regulation 2018
- Plumbing and Drainage Act 2018
  - Plumbing and Drainage Regulation 2019

The QBCC also has a role in incorporating the requirements of the National Construction Code into Queensland law and regulation.
