= Retrospective think aloud =

Retrospective think aloud protocol is a technique used in usability, and eye tracking in particular, to gather qualitative information on the user intents and reasoning during a test. It's a form of think aloud protocol performed after the user testing session activities, instead of during them. Fairly often the retrospective protocol is stimulated by using a visual reminder such as a video replay. In writing studies, the visual reminder may be the writing produced during the think-aloud session.
