= The Men (pop rock band) =

The Men, 1992

The Men were an American pop rock band from Santa Monica, California. Despite its name, the group had two women as members. The group released a self-titled album on Polygram Records in 1992 (produced and engineered by David Leonard), which hit #22 on the Billboard Heatseekers chart on the strength of the single "Church of Logic, Sin, and Love". The tune hit #8 on the Mainstream Rock Tracks chart, but it was their only hit, and the group disbanded soon after. Their video got into medium rotation on MTV.

Jef Scott had fronted other LA-area bands, most notably The Jef Scott Group during the '80s. Jef has written songs featured on Sons Of Anarchy, The Vampire Diaries and 90210. Lore and David also had a side project called Jimi's Kids, which sometimes featured a past and future collaborator, Ken David Paul. Ken and David had been in two other bands together, Tocan and Kill Buddha.

== Members ==
- Jef Scott - vocals, guitar
- Lore Wilhelm - vocals, guitar
- Nancy Hathorn - vocals, bass
- David Botkin - vocals, drums
