= RiTa =

Software toolkit for processing English language

- Original author: Daniel C. Howe
- Developer: RiTa Contributors
- Stable release: v3.0.2 / January 1, 2022; 4 years ago
- Written in: JavaScript, Java
- Platform: Cross-platform
- Type: Natural Language
- License: GPL
- Website: rednoise.org/rita/

RiTa is an open-source software toolkit for generative writing and English natural language, originally developed using the Java language by Daniel C. Howe and collaborators, and later implemented in JavaScript as rita.js. Current versions of RiTa (Version 3.0 was released in 2023) are implemented in both Java and JavaScript and integrate with p5.js, Processing, Node and Android.

== Features ==
- Heuristic algorithms for inflection, conjugation, stemming, tokenization, etc.
- Regex lexicon search to match phonemes, POS, meter, soundex and rhyme patterns
- Powerful options for text generation via context-free grammars and Markov chains
- Close integration with the writer-oriented RiScript scripting language (interpreted via Antlr)
- Feature extraction of phonemes, part-of-speech, syllables and stresses
- Letter-to-sound engine for analysis of arbitrary words (with or without a lexicon)

== Usage examples ==
// In JavaScript/Node

let { RiTa } = require('rita');

console.log(RiTa.rhymes('sweet'));

/*[
  'beat',    'beet',
  'cheat',   'cleat',
  'compete', 'complete',
  'conceit', 'concrete',
  'deceit',  'defeat', ...
]*/

let features = RiTa.analyze('The elephant took a bite!');
console.log(features);

/*{ 
  phones: 'dh-ah eh-l-ah-f-ah-n-t t-uh-k ey b-ay-t !',
  stresses: '0 1/0/0 1 1 1 !',
  syllables: 'dh-ah eh/l-ah/f-ah-n-t t-uh-k ey b-ay-t !',
  pos: 'dt nn vbd dt nn !',
  tokens: 'The elephant took a bite !'
}*/

// In Java/Processing

import rita.*;

void setup()
{
    size(100, 200);
    textSize(16);
    fill(0);
  
    String[] words = RiTa.rhymes("sweet");
    for (int i = 0; i < words.length; i++) {
        text(words[i], 20, 20 + i * 18);
    }
  
    println(RiTa.analyze("The elephant took a bite!"));
}

== Related projects ==
- Tracery/Bracery by Kate Compton
- Nlp-Compromise by Spencer Kelly
- Processing (programming language) by Casey Reas and Ben Fry
- p5.js by Lauren McCarthy
- Twine by Chris Klimas

== Projects using RiTa ==
- Zuckifier, 2015. Sam Lavigne
- @SortingBot, 2015. Darius Kazemi
- The Whole Brilliant Enterprise, 2014. Jer Thorp and the Office for Creative Research
- Game Definitions, 2013. Molleindustria
- Mirroring Tears: Visages, 2011. John Cayley and Penny Florence
- The Readers Project, 2009. John Cayley and Daniel C. Howe

== License ==
RiTa is free, libre and open-source according to the GNU General Public License.

== Notes ==
The name RiTa is derived from the old Norse, meaning to mark, scratch, or scribble.

== See also ==
- Electronic literature
- Digital poetry
- Natural language generation
- Natural language processing
- Generative Art
