= Residential Tenancies Authority =

Queensland, Australia body

The Residential Tenancies Authority (RTA) is the Queensland Government statutory body that administers the Residential Tenancies and Rooming Accommodation Act 2008 (the Act). The RTA is responsible to the Minister for Housing and Public Works and Minister for Youth.

From July 2022, the Queensland Government provides the RTA with a grant to fund its operations. The RTA works with all sector groups including tenants, property managers and owners, community and industry stakeholder groups and the Queensland Government.

The RTA provides tenancy information, bond management, dispute resolution, compliance and enforcement, and education services.

The RTA was previously known as the Rental Bond Authority and was established in 1989. In 1994, the name was changed, and the role of the organisation was expanded.

The core responsibility of the RTA is to administer the Residential Tenancies and Rooming Accommodation Act 2008 (the Act) legislation.

The Act outlines the rights and responsibilities of tenants, property managers/agents, property owners/landlords and caravan park managers involved in residential renting in Queensland.

It sets out what the parties to a tenancy agreement can and cannot do, how to address issues that may arise during a tenancy and explains what measures can be taken if one of the parties to a tenancy breaches the provisions of the law.

The Act also outlines the rights and responsibilities of residents, providers and agents in rooming style accommodation such as boarding houses, supported accommodation, student accommodation (not including on-campus accommodation), and a residence where the lessor lives, and four or more rooms are rented. Rooming accommodation is generally where accommodation is provided in return for rent of one or more rooms and residents share facilities outside of the room (e.g. bathrooms).

The Act combines and amends the provisions of the Residential Tenancies Act 1994 and the Residential Services (Accommodation) Act 2002. The 2 Acts were repealed on 30 June 2009 and the Residential Tenancies and Rooming Accommodation Act 2008 commenced on 1 July 2009.

The RTA also administers the Residential Tenancies and Rooming Accommodation Regulation 2009 (the Regulation).

The Housing Legislation Amendment Act 2021 (HLA Act) that came into effect on 20 October 2021 amends both the Act and the Regulation. It removed “without grounds” notices to leave for periodic tenancies, introduced a framework for renting with pets, and allowed tenants to apply for emergency repair orders. Minimum housing standards applied to new and renewed tenancies from 1 September 2023 and to all tenancies from 1 September 2024. From 1 July 2023 rent could be increased no more than once every 12 months.

The RTA's main office is located at 150 Mary Street in the Brisbane central business district.

== Role of the RTA ==
The role of the RTA is to provide:

- provide tenancy information
- manage rental bonds
- provide a dispute resolution service
- investigate offences under the Act and prosecute where appropriate
- provide community education
- provide advice to the Minister about residential tenancy and rooming accommodation issues and the operation of the Act, and
- monitor sector data and conduct research.

== Governance of the RTA ==
The RTA is governed by a Board of Directors which consists of a Chair and six directors.

The organisational structure includes the Chief Executive Officer and five divisions.

The RTA’s decision-making processes are informed by compliance and transparency and its corporate governance framework is based on the Queensland Auditor-General’s model and includes far‑reaching accountability processes.

The RTA's operations, performance and compliance are reported in detail through the annual report.

== See also ==
- Government of Queensland
