= Arlit Department =

Coordinates: 18°44′13″N 7°23′07″E

Arlit
- Department
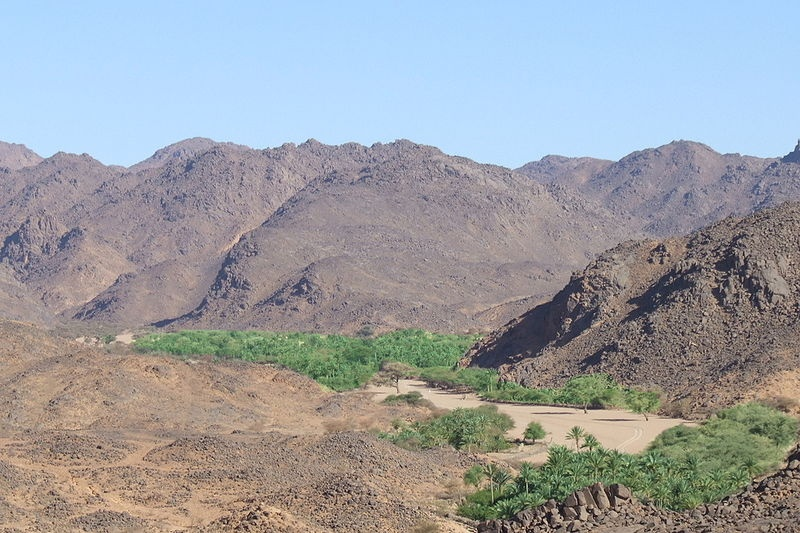
- The valleys of Timia

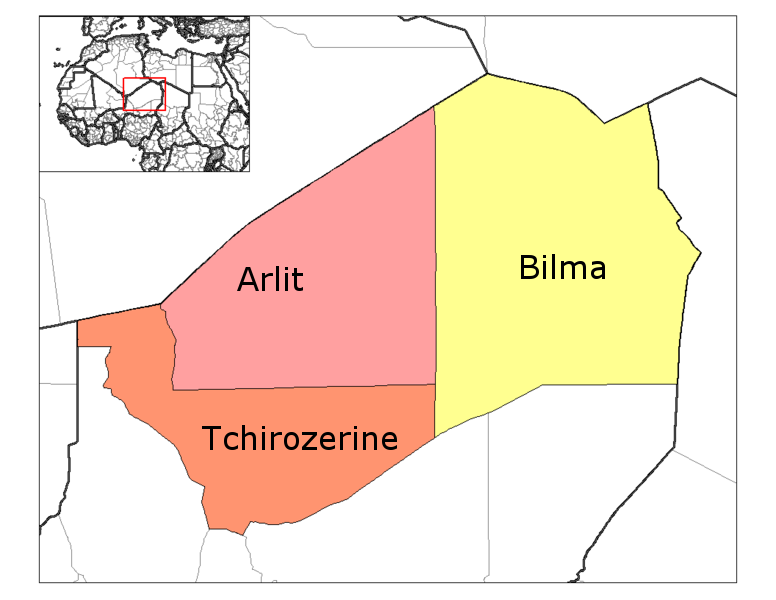
- Arlit Department (old borders) location in the region
- Country: Niger
- Region: Agadez Region
- Seat: Arlit

Area
  - Total: 61,180 km^{2} (23,620 sq mi)

Population (2012 census)
  - Total: 105,025
  - Density: 1.717/km^{2} (4.446/sq mi)
- Time zone: UTC+1 (GMT 1)

Arlit is a department of the Agadez Region in Niger. Its capital lies at the city of Arlit. As of 2012, the department had a total population of 105,025 people.

== Communes ==
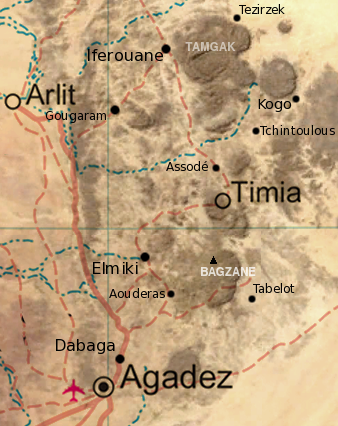

It is divided administratively into the following communes:

- Arlit (79,725 inhabitants)
- Dannet (14,964 inhabitants)
- Gougaram (10,336 inhabitants)

Arlit also contains the historically important village of Tchintoulous.

Smaller settlements include:

- Oubandawaki Makiani
- Sidaouet
- Tarhmert
- Teouat
