= Agadez Region =

Region of Niger

Agadez
- Region
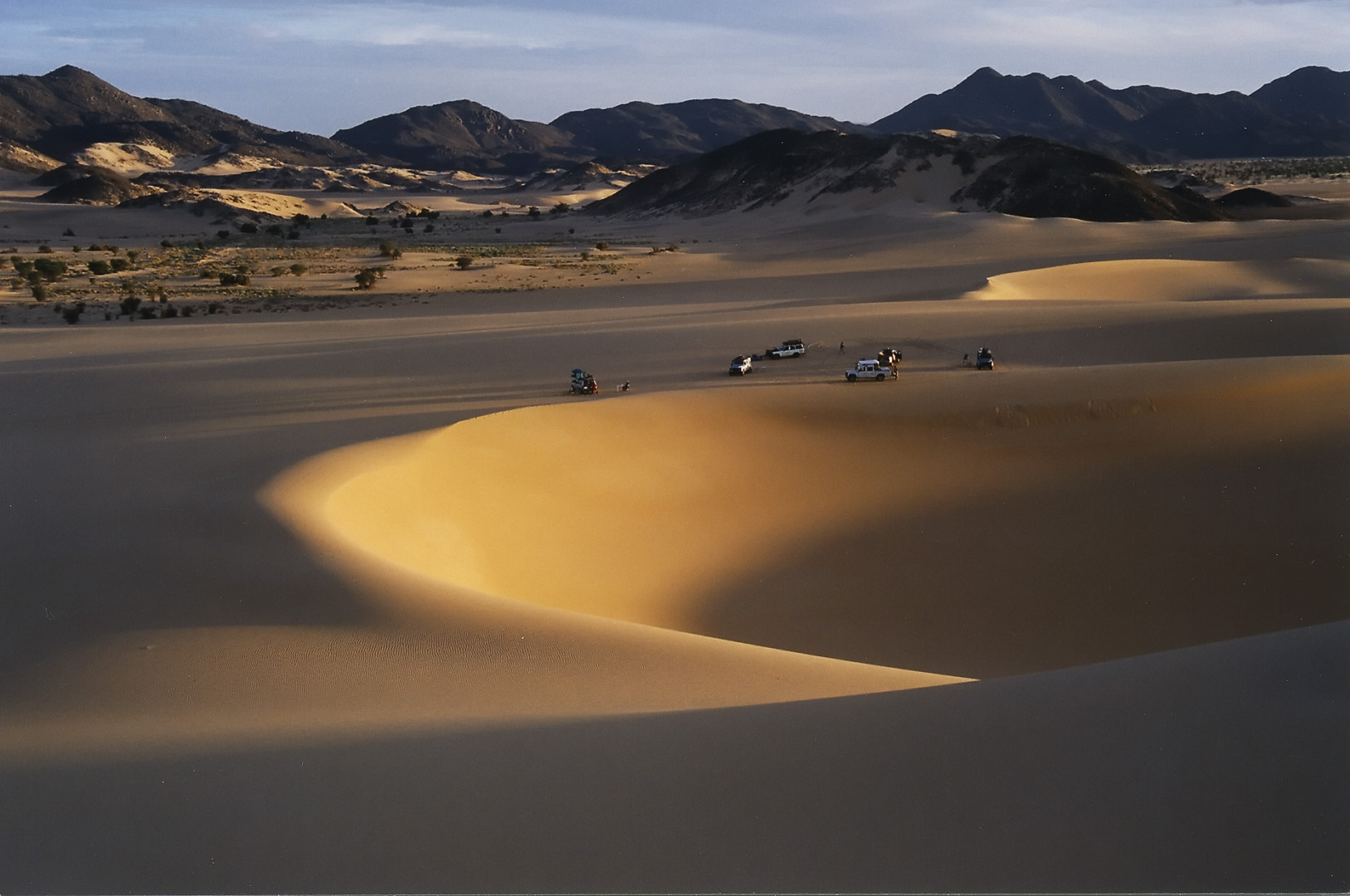
- Desert near Arakao

- Location within Niger
- Coordinates: 17°0′N 8°0′E
- Country: Niger
- Capital: Agadez

Government
  - Governor: Sadou Soloké

Area
  - Total: 667,799 km^{2} (257,839 sq mi)

Population (2012 census)
  - Total: 487,620
  - Density: 0.73019/km^{2} (1.8912/sq mi)
- Time zone: UTC+1 (West Africa Time)
- HDI (2021): 0.508 low · 2nd of 7

Agadez Region is one of the seven regions of Niger. At 667,799 square kilometres (257,839 mi^{2}), it covers more than half of Niger's land area, and is the largest region in the country, as well as the largest African state subdivision. The capital of the region is Agadez.

== History ==
The region is a centre for palaeontology, with numerous dinosaur skeletons being found here, including the Ouranosaurus nigeriensis. Cave painting and the remains of ancient human settlements are also located here. Tuareg peoples began migrating to the region from the mid-8th century. From the mid-15th century to the early 20th, much of the region was under the control of the Sultanate of Agadez, except for a period when the area came under the rule of the Songhai Empire in the 1500s.

The region suffered with the advent of French colonialism as power shifted away to the southwest; Tuareg disaffection with French rule resulted in the Kaocen revolt in 1916–17. This process continued following Niger's independence in 1960; local Tuareg saw little recompense from the uranium mining boom in Arlit in the 1970s, and Agadez Region was struck by repeated droughts and famines. Since then there have been two Tuareg rebellions: from 1990–95 and 2007–09. In recent years the region has also been affected by an insurgency in the Maghreb by Islamist groups.

== Geography ==
The Agadez Region borders Algeria (Tamanrasset Province and Illizi Province) and Libya (Murzuq District) to the north, Chad (Tibesti Region) to the east, Diffa Region, Zinder Region, Tahoua Region and Maradi Region to the south, and Mali (Kidal Region) to the west. It is by far the largest region of the country, representing 52% of the total area of Niger. The region is dominated by the Sahara desert, and includes the vast Ténéré portion of that desert, as well as dune seas such as the Erg of Bilma. The Aïr Mountains, the tallest peaks in Niger, are also located here. The Djado Plateau is located in the far north.

=== Settlements ===
Agadez is the regional capital. Other major settlements include Aderbissinat, Arlit, Assamakka, Bilma, Dirkou, Iferouane, In-Gall, Madama, Séguédine, Tchirozerine, Tegguiada In Tessoum and Timia. The historically important city of Tchintoulous also lies in the region, but today is only a sparsely populated village.

== Administrative subdivisions ==
Agadez is subdivided into six departments:

Administrative subdivisions
Department	Area	Population (2012)	Chief town	Cantons
Aderbissinat	51,360 km^{2}	35,320 inhabitants	Aderbissinat	
Arlit	61,180 km^{2}	105,025 inhabitants	Arlit	
Bilma	277,700 km^{2}	17,935 inhabitants	Bilma	Bilma, Djado, Fachi, Kawar
Iferouane	32,731 km^{2}	32,731 inhabitants	Iferouane	
In-Gall	61,170 km^{2}	51,903 inhabitants	In-Gall	
Tchirozérine	30,960 km^{2}	244,706 inhabitants	Tchirozérine	

== Demographics ==
Agadez has a large area but is sparsely populated. Its 487,620 inhabitants (as per the 2012 census) account for only 2.8% of the total population of Niger, with a population density of 0.73 inhabitants per square kilometre (1.9/sq mi). Much of its population comprises nomadic or semi-nomadic peoples, including Arabs, Fulani, Kanuri, Dazaga Toubou and various Tuareg groups. The Tagdal language and Tasawaq language, thought to be mixed Songhai-Tuareg languages, are also spoken.

Historical population
Year	Pop.	±%
1977	124,985	—
1985	208,828	+67.1%
2001	321,639	+54.0%
2012	487,620	+51.6%

== Economy ==
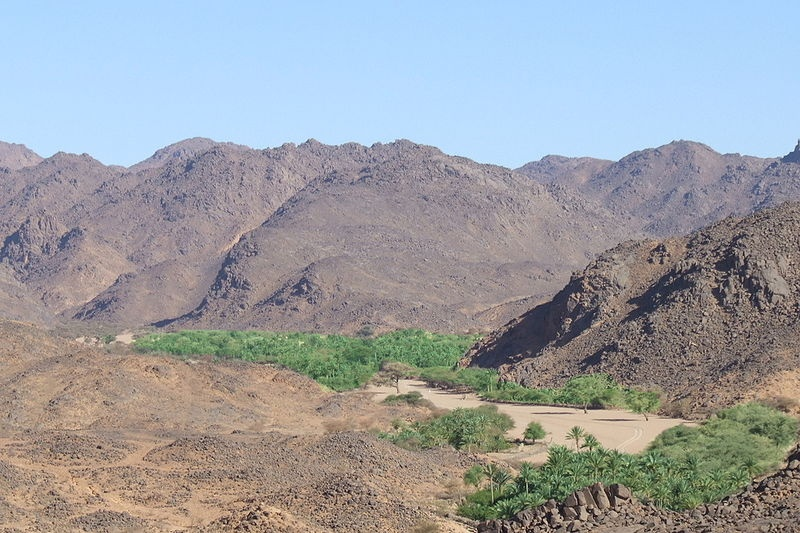
The Aïr Mountains near Timia

Traversed for centuries by the Trans-Saharan trade routes, the oasis towns of the Aïr and the eastern Kaouar Cliffs are known for their gardens, salt manufacture, and date cultivation. Arlit is the centre of Niger's uranium industry, a prominent economic sector in the region with uranium pits and mines operated by foreign companies providing substantial revenue for the country. The French discovered Niger's first uranium deposits in the Tim Mersoi Basin of the Agadez Region in 1958 and since then French companies such as Areva have maintained a large footprint in the region, employing a large quantity of locals. Depressed uranium prices since the 1980s have hit the region hard, though uranium remains one of the main foreign exchange earners for the country and a main export. The region is less poor than other regions of the country, having the second-highest Human Development Index and the second-lowest incidence of extreme poverty according to World Bank data from 2018.

Agadez had historically been one of the main centres of tourism in Niger, with visitors attracted by the desert scenery, archaeological sites and the Air Mountains. However Tuareg rebellions and activities of Islamist militants in Agadez region have severely reduced the numbers of tourists, with most third party governments advising against travel to the region.

== See also ==
- Communes of Niger
- Departments of Niger
- Regions of Niger
