= Elméki =

- Location in Niger
- Coordinates: 17°44′15″N 8°16′34″E
- Country: Niger
- Region: Agadez
- Department: Tchirozérine

Elméki, also El Meki, El Mekki, El Mecki or Inzareg, is a small town in the Aïr Massif mountains in the Agadez Region of central-northern Niger, about 90 kilometres (56 mi) by air northwest of Agadez, and about 19 kilometres (12 mi) by air northwest of Aouderas. The area is inhabited by Tuareg nomads. The area is known for its mining activities, particularly tin, emeralds and beryl.

== Geography ==
Elméki is situated in the Aïr Massif mountains in the Agadez Region in the central-northern part of the country. By air it is about 90 kilometres (56 mi) northwest of Agadez, and about 19 kilometres (12 mi) northwest of Aouderas. The Wadi Kodri is in the vicinity and Kodri mountain lies immediately to the northwest of the town, with an elevation of 727 metres (2,385 ft).

== Economy ==
The Elméki area is known for its mining activity, particularly tin and artisanal mining for beryl and emeralds. Cassiterite and columbite (niobite) are also found here. The Société Minière du Niger (SMDN) has been involved with mining in Elméki. In the 1990s there were plans to build the Elméki Dam across the river at Elméki to generate hydroelectric power.

== Landmarks ==
The town contains the Elméki Integrated Health Centre.
