= Ag Mohammed Wau Teguidda Kaocen =

Tuareg clan leader and rebel (1880–1919)

The former palace of Kaocen Ag Geda, in 1991 Hôtel de l'Air, Agadez, Niger.

To the right a wall of the former palace of Kaocen Ag Geda, in 1991 Hôtel de l'Air, Agadez, Niger.

Kaocen Ag Geda (1880–1917) (also known as Kaocen, Kaosen, Kawsen) was a Tuareg noble and clan leader. Born in 1880 near wadi Tamazlaght Aïr (modern Niger), Kaocen from tribe of Ikazkazan berber, a subset of the Kel Owey confederation. He led the Kaocen revolt, a rebellion against French colonial rule of the area around the Aïr Mountains of northern Niger, during 1916–17.

After the defeat of the revolt, Kaocen fled north; he was captured and hanged in 1919 by local forces in Mourzouk, Libya.

== Family ==
Born into the wuro's family tribe of Ikazkazan Tuareg in what is now (Aïr Mountains) the north of Niger, his exact lineage is debated. His brother Mokhtar Kodogo was his second in command throughout his life, and survived only a year after his death, killed while leading a revolt amongst the Toubou Fula in the Sultanate of Damagaram.

== Resistance against the French ==
An adherent to the militantly anti-French Sanusiya Sufi religious order, Kaocen engaged in numerous, mostly unsuccessful battles against French forces from at least 1909. He raided French columns in what is today eastern Niger and western Chad. He participated in several raids in the Borkou, Ennedi and Tibesti area, including the 1909 battle at Galakka. Under the direct orders of the Sanusiya leader, he commanded forces at Ennedi in 1910, only to be defeated by the French and forced to retreat to the border of Darfur. Returning first to Ounianga Kabir then the Fezzan (the center of Sanusiya power), Kaocen rallied both tribal subjects and other nomads (not all Tuareg) who were loyal to the Sanusiya.

There, in October 1914, the Sanusiya leadership declared a Jihad against the French colonialists. In 1916, Kaocen's forces began attacking towns in the Aïr Mountains. With the aid of the Sultan of Agadez, Kaocen's forces placed the garrison under siege on 17 December 1916. They seized all the major towns of the Aïr, including Ingall, Assodé, and Aouderas, placing what is today northern Niger under rebel control for over three months.

== Defeat and death ==
On 3 March 1917 a large French force dispatched from Zinder relieved the Agadez garrison, and Kaocen's forces retreated to Tibesti, conducting raids against the French. He was captured by local forces in Murzuq, and they hung him.

== Context ==
Today Kaocen is remembered by Tuareg nationalists as a hero, and his name is a popular given name in Tuareg communities. Memory of the revolt, and the killings in its wake, remain fresh in the minds of modern Tuareg. The episode is seen both as a part of a larger anti-colonial struggle, and amongst some as part of the post-independence struggle for autonomy of the existing governments of Niger and its neighbors.
