= Timia =

- Commune and town
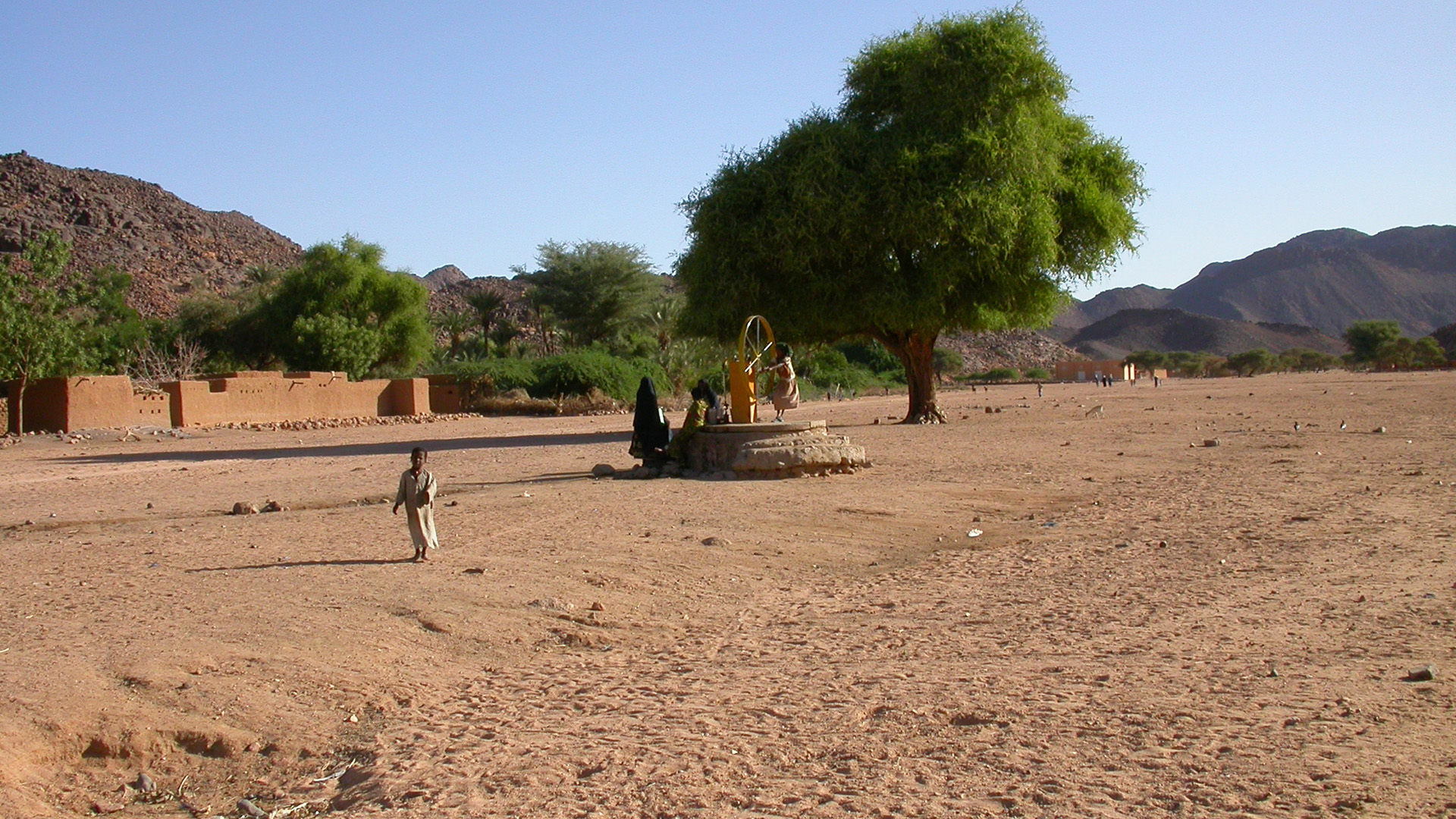

- Location in Niger
- Coordinates: 18°6′52″N 8°46′45″E
- Country: Niger
- Region: Agadez Region
- Department: Ifferoune Department

Area
  - Total: 7,452 sq mi (19,301 km^{2})

Population (2020)
  - Total: 25,005
  - Density: 3.3554/sq mi (1.2955/km^{2})
- Time zone: UTC+1 (WAT)

Topographic Map of the Aïr mountains. Timia is located slightly below the center of the map.

Timia is a town and commune in northern Niger, situated at an oasis in the Aïr Mountains, Agadez Region, Arlit Department. Visitors come to the Tuareg town to see a seasonal waterfall, a former French fort and the nearby ruined town of Assodé. As of 2020, the commune had a total population of 25,005 people.

Timia lies south of Iferouane and north of Agadez. The main town lies around 3 km from a stone guelta oasis, which holds water year round. It is also known for its fruit trees, an unusual sight in the Saharan regions of northern Niger.

== Gallery ==
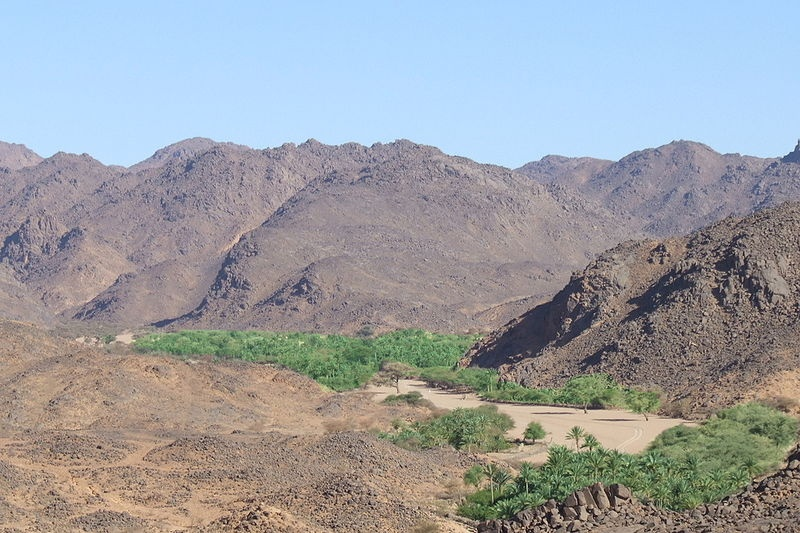
The valleys of Timia

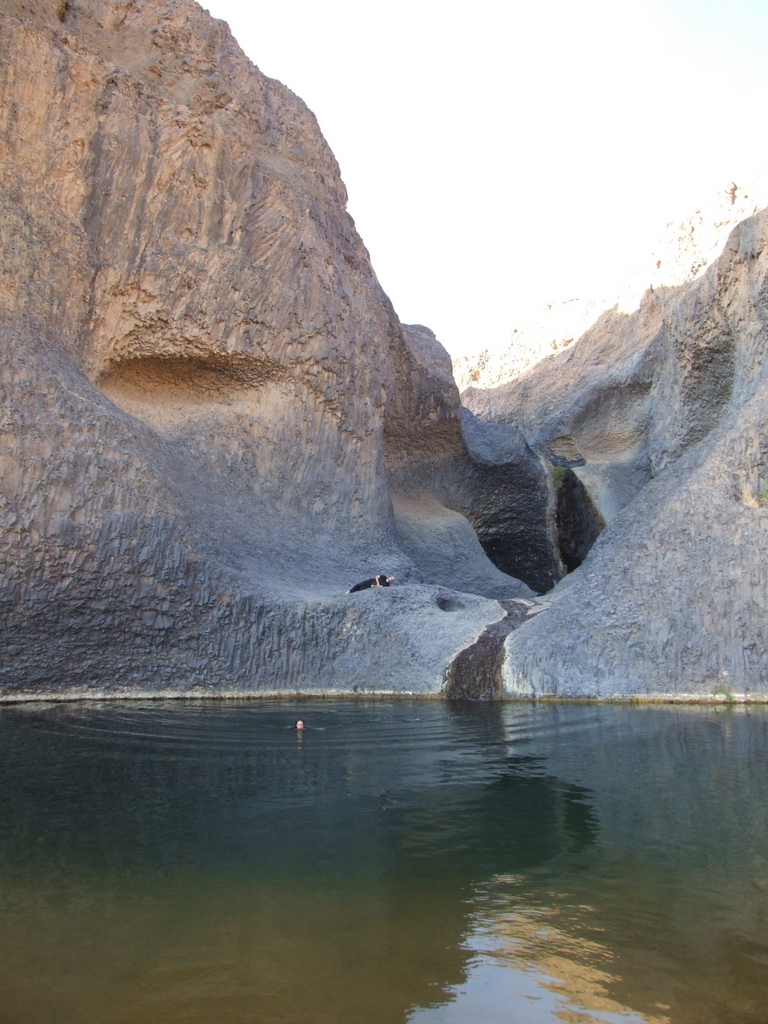
The Oasis of Timia

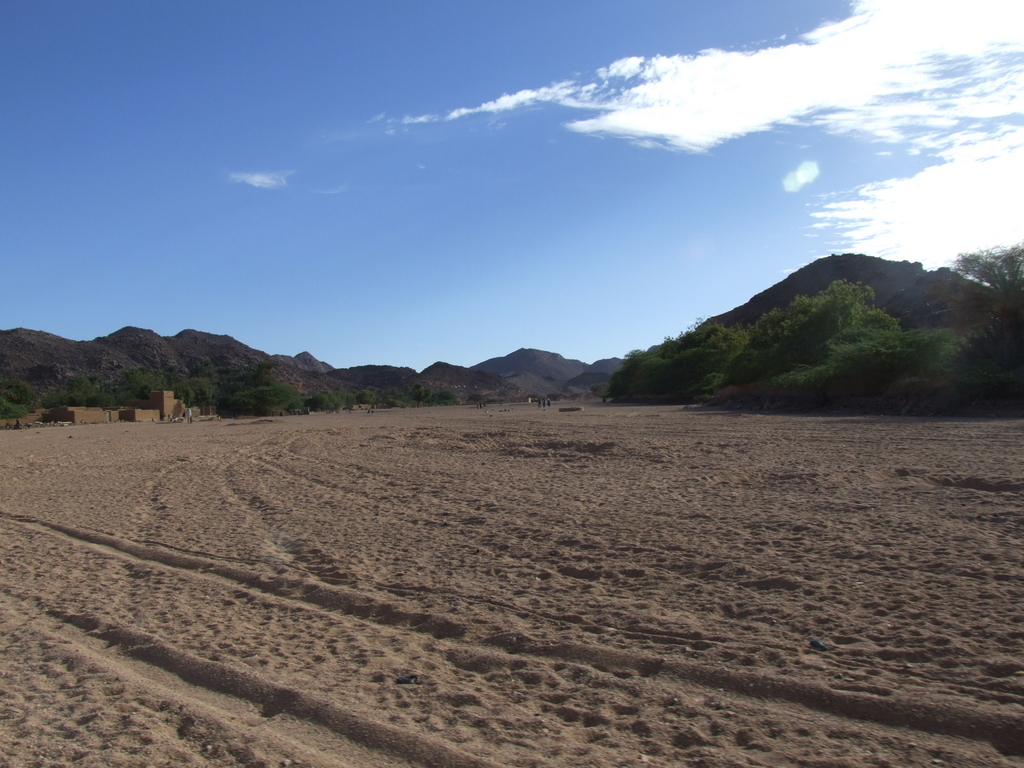
In the valley

Well in Timia
