= Aouderas =

- Location in Niger
- Coordinates: 17°37′N 8°25′E
- Country: Niger
- Region: Agadez Region
- Department: Tchirozerine Department
- Elevation: 796 m (2,612 ft)

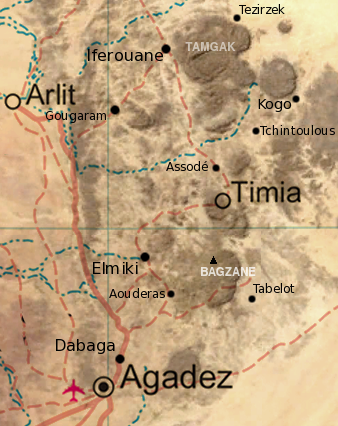
Map of the southern Aïr Mountains

Aouderas (alt: Adharous, Auderas) is an oasis village in the Aïr Mountains of northeastern Niger, about 90 km (56 mi) north-northeast of the regional capital of Agadez. It is also the name of the valley in which the town is located.

== Geography ==
Aouderas village is in the top of the Aouderas valley, at the base of 1,408-metre (4,619 ft) Mount Todra and is just south of the Todgha range, which runs east to the 2,022-metre (6,634 ft) Mount Bagzane (the highest point in Niger, part of the high Bagzane Massif), and the Assada plateau further north. Aouderas valley is locally called a kouri, a Hausa term for a seasonal wash. The washed soil sprouts grasses in the brief rainy season, some small Dun palms (Hyphaene thebaica), Acacia and Calotropis procera, while the sandy bottom land to the west of the town can be thick with palms and is suitable for irrigated agriculture. Outside of that, the land is almost completely barren except for seasonal grasses.

== Population and history ==
A Tuareg community, the small sedentary population is today made up of several hundred mostly Ikelan (or Bouzou in Hausa / Bella in Songhai), former slaves and captives of the Kel Owey Tuareg from Hausa and other southern peoples. These peoples were settled in Aouderas, as in other northern oases, to tend the date palm plantations fed by the oasis held by the noble clans. Situated on a plateau surrounded by mountains, Aouderas expanded in the 19th and 20th centuries. In the 1970s, French geographers estimated there were 15000 date palms in Aouderas, more than the other older date plantations in In Gall, but half the number of the newer plantations at Telwa and Timia to the north. As of 1972, the number of farms expanded since Heinrich Barth's visit in 1850, and the number of hectares under cultivation has expanded from 19.5 in 1946 to 59.3. As the area of cultivation expanded, so too has the diversity, as Aouderas's existence as a servile date plantation for Tuareg caravans has declined.

While the early history of the Aïr Massif is speculative, the area has been populated since at least 10,000 years ago, when the surrounding deserts were lush grasslands. When the Tuareg tribes were pushed south by Arab invaders in the eighth and ninth centuries CE, there were Gobirwa Hausa in the southern Aïr. Successive Tuareg Tels have controlled the area since at least the twelfth century. Agadez, as well as Ingall to the east, were the farthest outposts of the Songhai Empire in the early 1st century. During the sixteenth century, the area fell under the control of the newly established Tuareg Sultanate of Agadez. It remained so until the arrival of the French at the end of the 19th. Barth passed through the Aouderas valley in 1850, and reported that it was only recently that the Kel Owey had pushed the Kel Geres and Kel Itesen Tuareg south and west out of the valley. Some Itesen landowners, though, remained Aouderas as late as 1970. While the Kel Owey pastoralised in the region, visiting towns and their plantations irregularly, Aouderas developed a small but unusual sedentary population of Tuareg cultivators. Barth also described this valley as the southernmost instance of plow agriculture, though he witnessed the local servile population pulling the plows in place of farm animals. Despite dire social conditions for the sedentary population and frequent raids from rival Tels and Toubu pastoralists, the sedentary Ikelan had built a large fertile island in the Aïr.

From one of the largest oases in the area, Aouderas was abandoned in 1917–18. A violent 1875 flood destroyed most of the date plantation, and the emergence of the French weakened Kel Owey defences. From the 1880s, Toubu raids increased, and when the Tuareg Kaosen Ag Mohammed rose against the French in 1917, Aouderas was one of the towns he destroyed on his way to the siege of Agadez. When the French retook Agadez, a brutal punitive expedition through the Aïr left Aouderas abandoned.

By 1924, though, Aouderas was resettled, both with the remains of the local Ikelan, but also with refugees from Iferwan, also razed by Kaosen and the French successively. At that time it was the second largest town in the Aïr, after Agadez. While the Kel Owey continued to dominate the town, the sedentary farmers now held and inherited much of the Aouderas gardens, rare in the region. Most non-resident Tuareg land owners in 1946 were women, holding land under what the Tuaregs call a khabus, matrilineal, system. As the gardens prospered, more towns were formed to the west by Aouderas residents, the largest being Tegmak.

The famines of the 1970s and 80s brought an end to this expansion, and as Agadez and Arlit grew, Aouderas shrunk. The Tuareg Rebellion of the 1990s saw brutal government reprisals which depopulated many villages in the Aïr. Finally, in 2004, a locust invasion ravaged the Aouderas gardens.

== Tourist industry ==
Today, with caravan trade dwindled, date crops are supplemented with market gardens, citrus, and increasingly the tourist trade centred in Agadez. A rough piste (dirt road) links the town with Agadez, and the larger Tuareg settlement (and tourist destination) in the north of the Aïr, Iferouane, and is on the main route from Agadez to Timia, a larger oasis in the north. Other nearby oasis towns include the more visited Elméki, 20 km to the west, Tammazaret, 40 km to the north, and Dabbaga on the road to Agadez to the south.

== Tuareg Rebellion, 2007 ==
On 7 September 2007, a small Nigerien military garrison at Aouderas was attacked by Tuareg-led MNJ rebels, taking six soldiers captive. The 2007 Tuareg insurgency essentially precluded any 2007 tourist season, while roads have been mined, and locals fear attacks by both the rebels and the army. The entire area saw brutal army reprisals in the early 1990s during the last Tuareg insurgence which ended in 1995.
