= Kaocen revolt =

1916–17 Tuareg rebellion against French colonial rule

Coordinates: 18.2769°N 7.9994°E

Kaocen Revolt
- Part of the Tuareg Rebellions and World War I (concurrent)
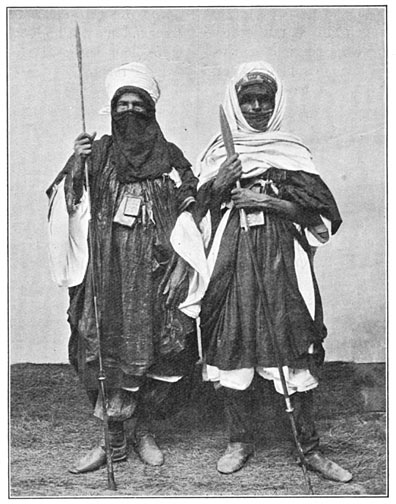
- Tuareg warriors, photographed 1906.
Date	1916–1917
Location	Northern Niger
Result	French victory

Belligerents
France: French West Africa; United Kingdom	Tuareg guerrillas Supported by: Senussi

Strength
150–1,000 troops	1,500–3,000 Tuareg warriors

The Kaocen revolt (Kabyle: Tagrawla n Kawsen) was a Tuareg rebellion against French colonial rule of the area around the Aïr Mountains of northern Niger during 1916–17.

== 1916 rising ==
Ag Mohammed Wau Teguidda Kaocen (1880–1919) was the Tuareg leader of the rising against the French. An adherent to the militantly anti-French Sanusiya Sufi religious order, Kaocen was the Amenokal (chief) of the Ikazkazan Tuareg confederation.

Kaocen had engaged in numerous, mostly indecisive, attacks on French colonial forces from at least 1909. When the Sanusiya leadership in the Fezzan oasis town of Kufra (in modern Libya) declared a Jihad against the French colonialists in October 1914, Kaocen rallied his forces. Tagama, the Sultan of Agadez had convinced the French military that the Tuareg confederations remained loyal, and with his help, Kaocen's forces placed the garrison under siege on 17 December 1916. Tuareg raiders, numbering over 1,000, led by Kaocen and his brother Mokhtar Kodogo, and armed with repeating rifles and one cannon seized from the Italians in Libya, defeated several French relief columns. They seized all the major towns of the Aïr, including Ingall, Assodé, and Aouderas, placing what is today northern Niger under rebel control for over three months.

== Suppression ==
Finally on 3 March 1917, a large French force, which had been dispatched from Zinder, relieved the Agadez garrison and began to seize the rebel towns. Large-scale French reprisals were taken against the towns, especially against local marabouts even though many were not Tuareg and had not supported the rebellion. Summary public executions by the French in Agadez and Ingall alone totaled 130. Tuareg rebels also carried out a number of atrocities.

While Kaocen fled north, he was hanged by local forces in Mourzouk in 1919, and Mokhtar Kodogo was killed by the French in 1920, when a revolt that he led amongst the Toubou and Fula in the Sultanate of Damagaram was defeated.

== Context ==
The revolt led by Kaocen was just one episode in a history of recurring conflict between some Tuareg confederations and the French. In 1911, a rising of Firhoun, Amenokal of Ouelimaden was crushed in Ménaka, only to reappear in northeast Mali after his escape from French custody in 1916.

Many Tuareg groups had continually fought the French (and the Italians after their 1911 invasion of Libya) since their arrival in the last decade of the 19th century. Others were driven to revolt by the severe drought of the years 1911–14, by French taxation and seizure of camels to aid other conquests, and by French abolition of the slave trade, leading many previously subservient settled communities of the area to themselves revolt against traditional rule and taxation by the nomadic Tuareg.

Memory of the revolt and the killings in its wake remain fresh in the minds of modern Tuareg, to whom it is seen as both part of a large anti-colonial struggle, and amongst some as part of the post-independence struggle for autonomy from the existing governments of Niger and its neighbors.

The Kaocen revolt can also be placed in a longer history of Tuareg conflict with ethnic Songhay and Hausa in the south central Sahara which goes back to at least the seizure of Agadez by the Songhay Empire in 1500 AD, or even the first migrations of Berber Tuaregs south into the Aïr in the 11th to 13th centuries AD.

Conflicts have persisted since independence, with major Tuareg risings in Mali's Adrar des Ifoghas during 1963–64, the 1990s insurgencies in both Mali and Niger, and a renewed series of insurgencies beginning in the mid-2000s (see Second Tuareg Rebellion).

== See also ==
- Military operations in North Africa during World War I
