= Dabous Giraffes =

Neolithic petroglyphs in Niger

Coordinates: 18°01′49″N 7°34′50″E

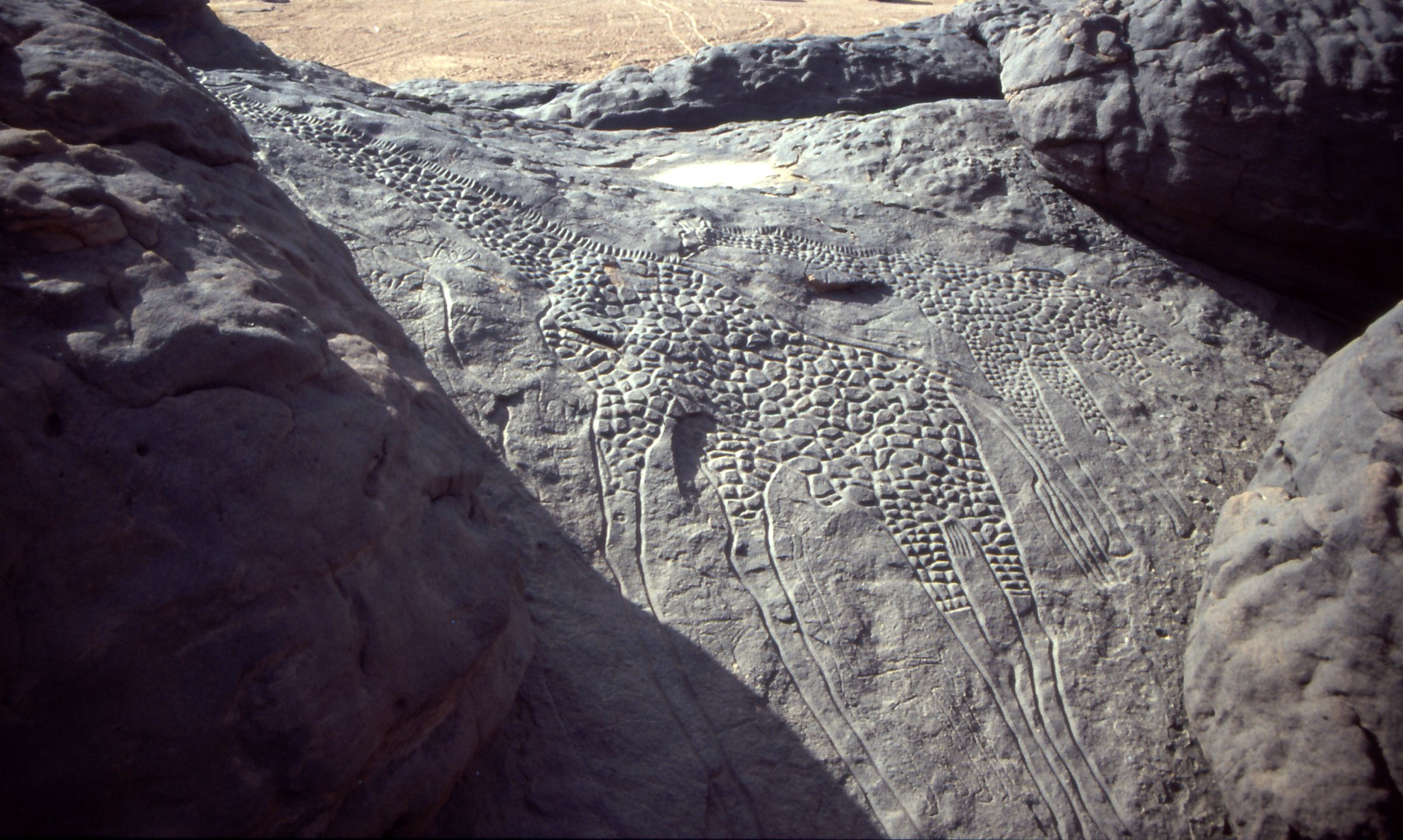
Dabous Giraffes, 1991

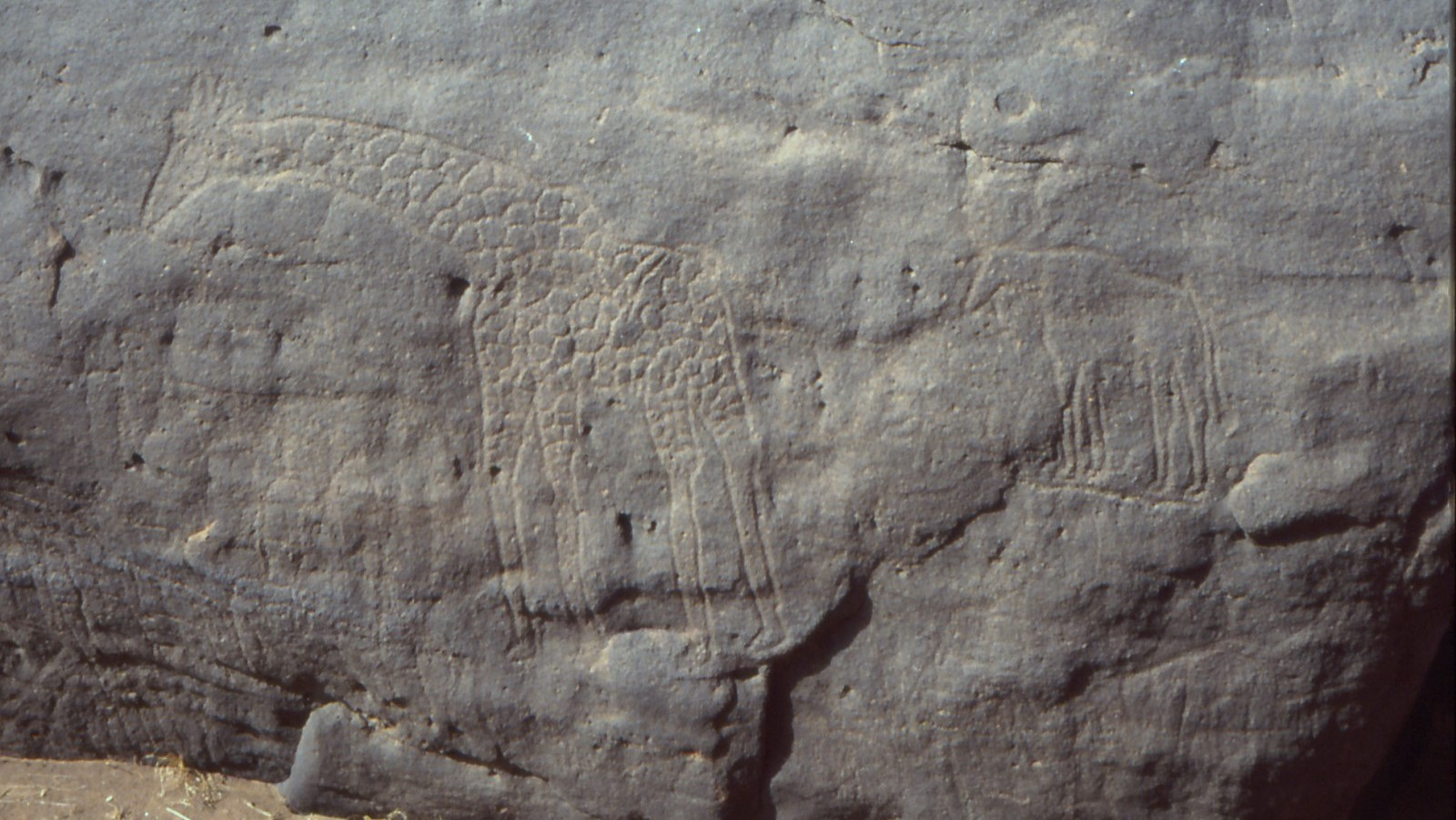
Smaller petroglyphs near the Dabous Giraffes

The Dabous Giraffes are neolithic petroglyphs by unknown artists on the western side of the Aïr Mountains in north-central Niger. The carvings are 6 metres (20 ft) in height and consist of two giraffes carved into the Dabous Rock with a great amount of detail. One of the giraffes is male, while the other, smaller, is female. The Dabous Giraffes are located on a sandstone outcrop in the Ténéré desert in the first foothills of the Aïr Mountains, about 110 km north of Agadez and a few kilometres from the Trans-Saharan Highway. They are the largest known animal petroglyphs in the world.

In the surroundings, 828 images have been found engraved on the rocks, of which 704 are animals (cattle, giraffes, ostriches, antelopes, lions, rhinoceros, and camels), 61 are human, and 17 are inscriptions in Tifinâgh. The carvings are believed to have been done between 6,000 and 8,000 years ago, during the African humid period, when the region was less arid, and the Sahara was a vast savannah. There are also remains of petrified wood found in the area.

The giraffe carvings were first recorded by French archaeologist Christian Dupuy in 1987, and documented by David Coulson in 1997 while on a photographic expedition to the site.

Due to degradation of the engravings resulting from human activity, a mold was made of the engravings for display. An aluminum cast of this mold is on display at the airport of Agadez. The Bradshaw Foundation is an organization dedicated to the protection and preservation of this petroglyph.

In 2022, Nikos Solounias suggested that the Dabous Giraffe petroglyphs (as well as some others in different localities) may actually represent depictions of a previously unknown species of extinct giraffe, which he named Giraffa sahara, after the Sahara region of Africa. This hypothetical species was proposed due to apparent differences in the spot patterning between the engravings and extant taxa. Although no bones that can be assigned to a distinct species have been discovered, Solounias suggested that they may be found in Saharan lake deposits.
