= Mont Idoukal-n-Taghès =

Highest mountain in Niger

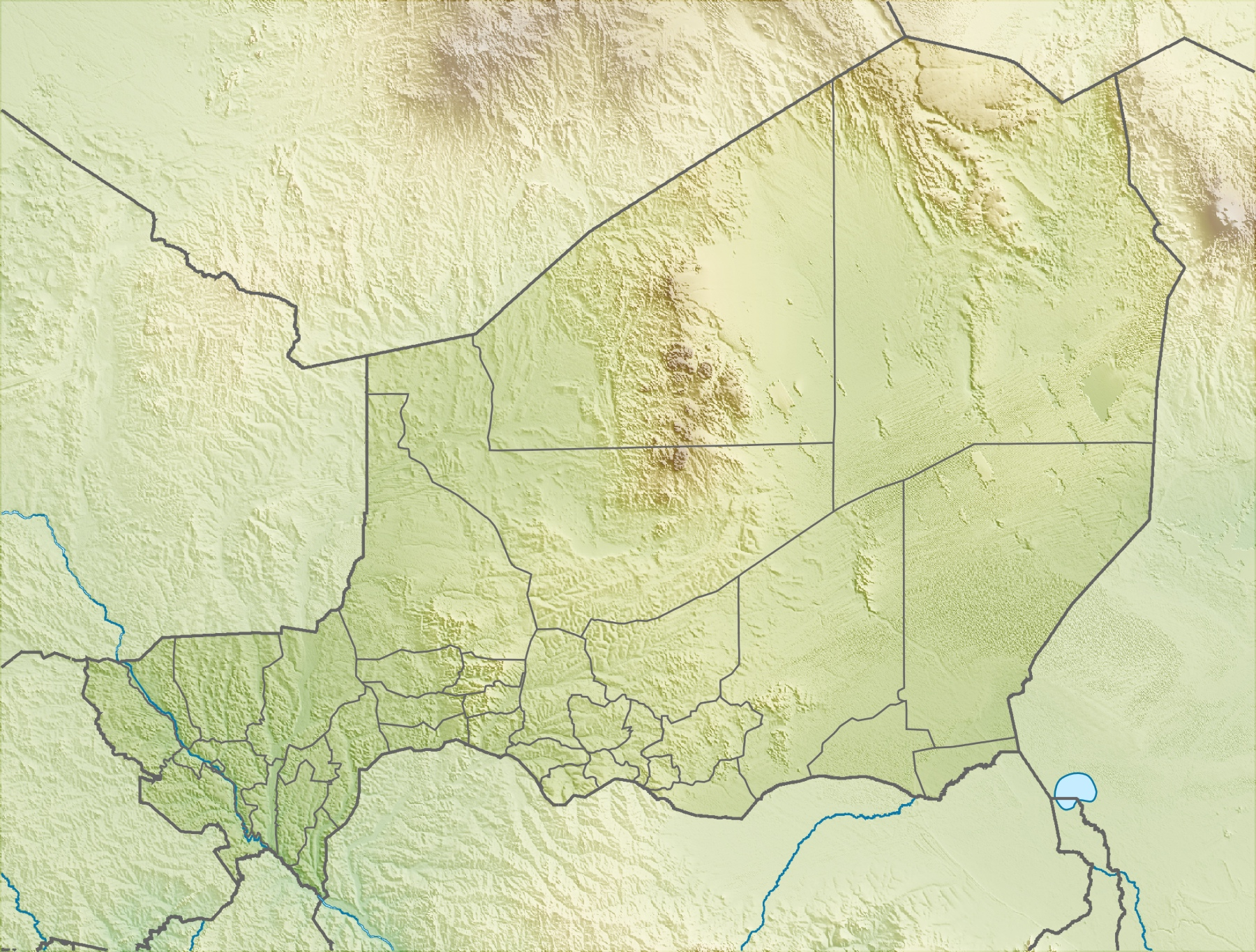
- Location within Niger

Highest point
- Elevation: 2,002 m (6,568 ft)
- Prominence: 1,307 m (4,288 ft)
- Listing: Country high point Ribu
- Coordinates: 17°50′21″N 8°43′13″E

Geography
- Location: Niger
- Parent range: Aïr Mountains

Mont Idoukal-n-Taghès (also Mont Bagzane, Mont Bagzan) is the highest mountain in Niger. Mont Idoukal-n-Taghès is located in the south central Aïr Mountains, and is at the northern end of the Bagzane plateau. The village and pilgrimage site of Abatol sits at the base of the peak. The Aouderas valley, the path of a seasonal wash (or Kouri) runs south from the foot of Idoukal-n-Taghès towards Agadez, the regional capital. The oasis town of Aouderas is just southwest of the mountain. Due to its high elevation, Mount Idoukal'n'Taghes has been found to host a number of Saharan-Mediterranean and Tropical plant species that have never been recorded elsewhere in Niger.

Official Nigerien and international sources believed Mont Gréboun, far to the north, to be the highest peak in the nation as late as 2001, when Gréboun's long standing lower measurement confirmed at 1,944 m (6,378 ft), which had variously been measured as high as 2,310 m (7,580 ft). Greboun has a much greater local relief, rising from near the desert floor, while Idoukal-n-Taghès sits atop a high massif with an average altitude above 1,600 m (5,200 ft) meters.

To honour the highest point in Niger, the official aircraft of the President of Niger is named Mont Bagzane.
