= Aïr Mountains =

Mountain range in northern Niger

- Aïr Massif, Ayr
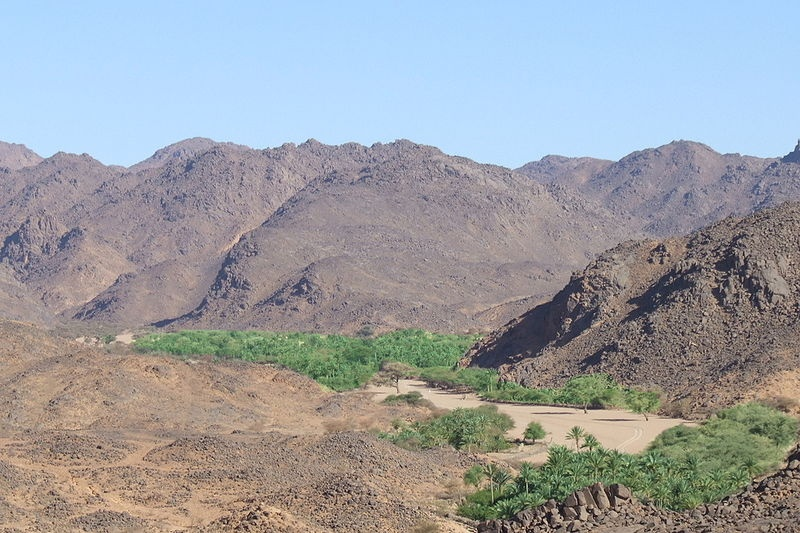
- The Timia Valley, in the Aïr Mountains

Highest point
- Peak: Mont Idoukal-n-Taghès
- Elevation: 2,022 m (6,634 ft)

Dimensions
- Area: 84,000 km^{2} (32,000 mi^{2})

Naming
- Native name: Ayar (Tamashek); Azbin (Hausa) (eastern); Abzin (Hausa) (western)

Geography
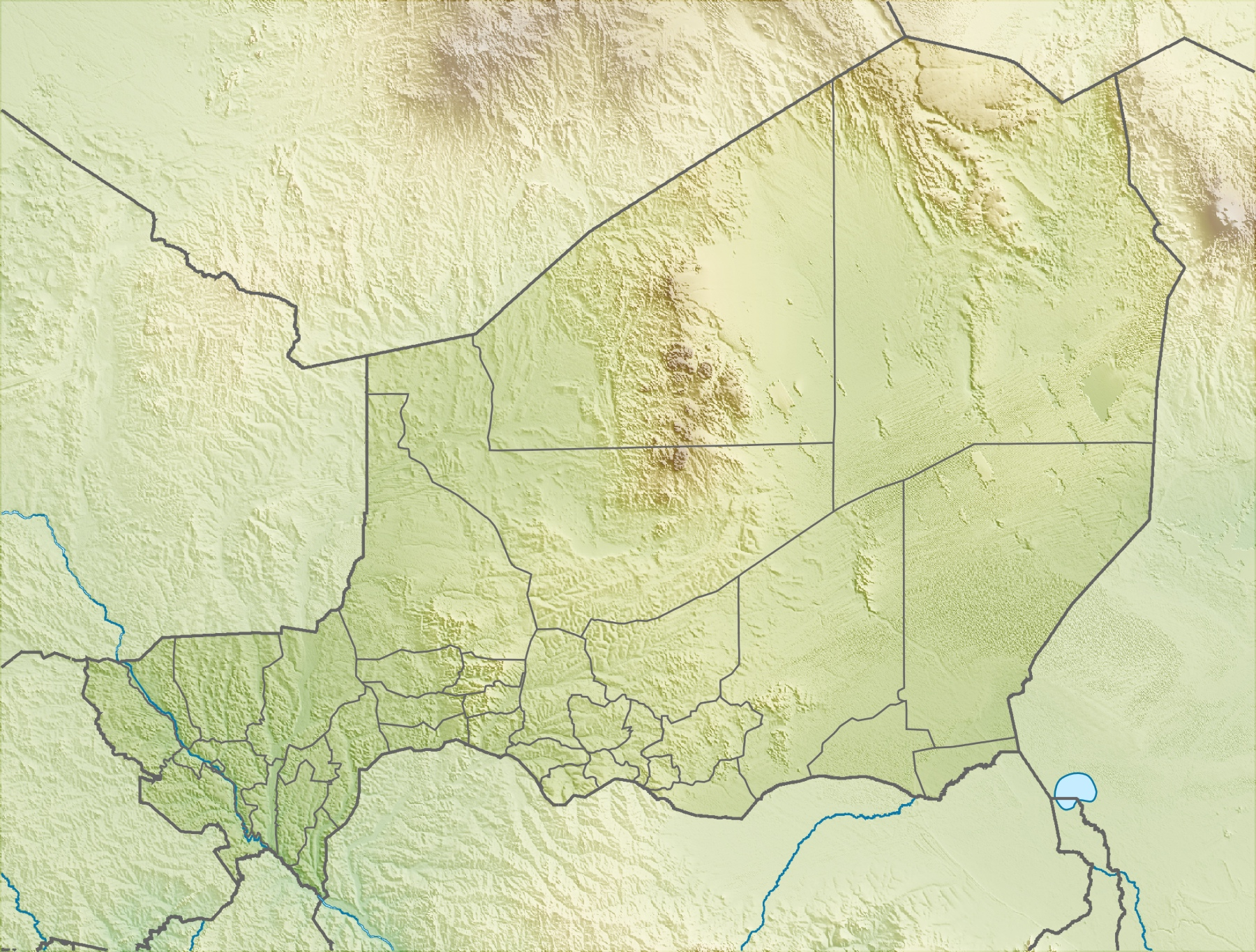
- Location within Niger
- Country: Niger
- Region: Agadez Region
- Range coordinates: 18°16.6′N 8°0′E

The Aïr Mountains or Aïr Massif (Tamajăq: Ayǝr; Hausa: Eastern Azbin, Western Abzin) is a triangular massif, located in northern Niger, within the Sahara. Part of the West Saharan montane xeric woodlands ecoregion, they rise to more than 1,800 m (5,900 ft) and extend over 84,000 km^{2} (32,000 sq mi). Lying in the midst of desert north of the 17th parallel, the Aïr plateau, with an average altitude between 500 and 900 m (1,600 and 3,000 ft), forms an island of Sahel climate which supports a wide variety of life, many pastoral and farming communities, and dramatic geological and archaeological sites. There are notable archaeological excavations in the region that illustrate the prehistoric past of this region. The endangered African wild dog (Lycaon pictus) once existed in this region, but may now be extirpated due to human population pressures in this region.

== Geology ==
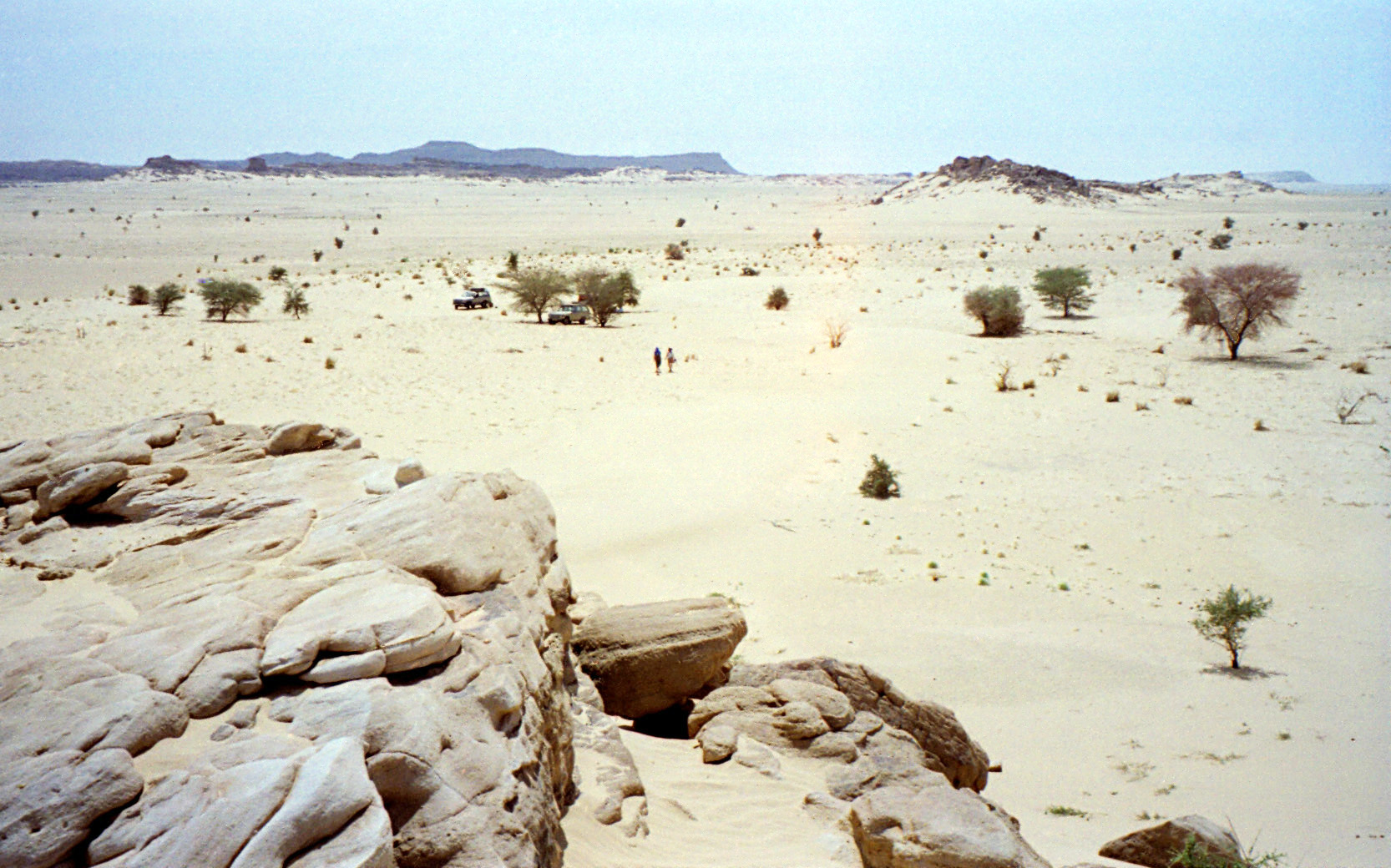
Desert near Agadez, with the Aïr Mountains in the distance. Note the volcanic outcrops, common to the Aïr.

The Precambrian to Cenozoic Aïr Mountains consist of peralkaline granite intrusions which appear dark in colour (unusual since most granitic masses are light-toned in the field). In the Sahara Desert, such mountains often stand out in stark relief as topographic heights amidst lowlands covered by sand. The terrain consists of high plateau, mountain ranges, and broad, sandy valleys and seasonal wadis which once contained rivers. Areas of these deep, often intersecting, valleys also contain waterborne clay and silt deposits. Underground watercourses in some of these valleys continue to provide year-round oasis and seasonal vegetation.

Topographic Map of the Aïr mountains

The Aïr mountains themselves consist of nine almost circular massifs rising from a rocky plateau, bordered by the sand dunes and plain of the Ténéré Desert to the east. The massif is a plateau consisting of a sub-Cambrian age erosion surface on Precambrian metamorphic rocks, punctuated by a series of flat-topped, granite intrusion peaks, which include Mont Idoukal-n-Taghès (Niger's highest point at 2022 m), Mont Tamgak (1988 m), Mont Greboun (1944 m), Adrar Bous, Fadei, Chirriet, Taghmert, Agueraguer, Takaloukouzet, and Goundai.

The massif contains volcanic features including the extinct caldera of Arakao, Cenozoic lava flows of hawaiite to trachyte composition, volcanic cones, tuff rings and one of the largest ring dike systems in the world. At Izouzaoenehe, lie the marble Blue Mountains, and the lower Zagado Valley is surrounded by white marble hills. Carboniferous sandstone and coal units in the Iullemmeden Basin just to the west of the massif contain uranium mineralisation sourced from the granites of the massif.

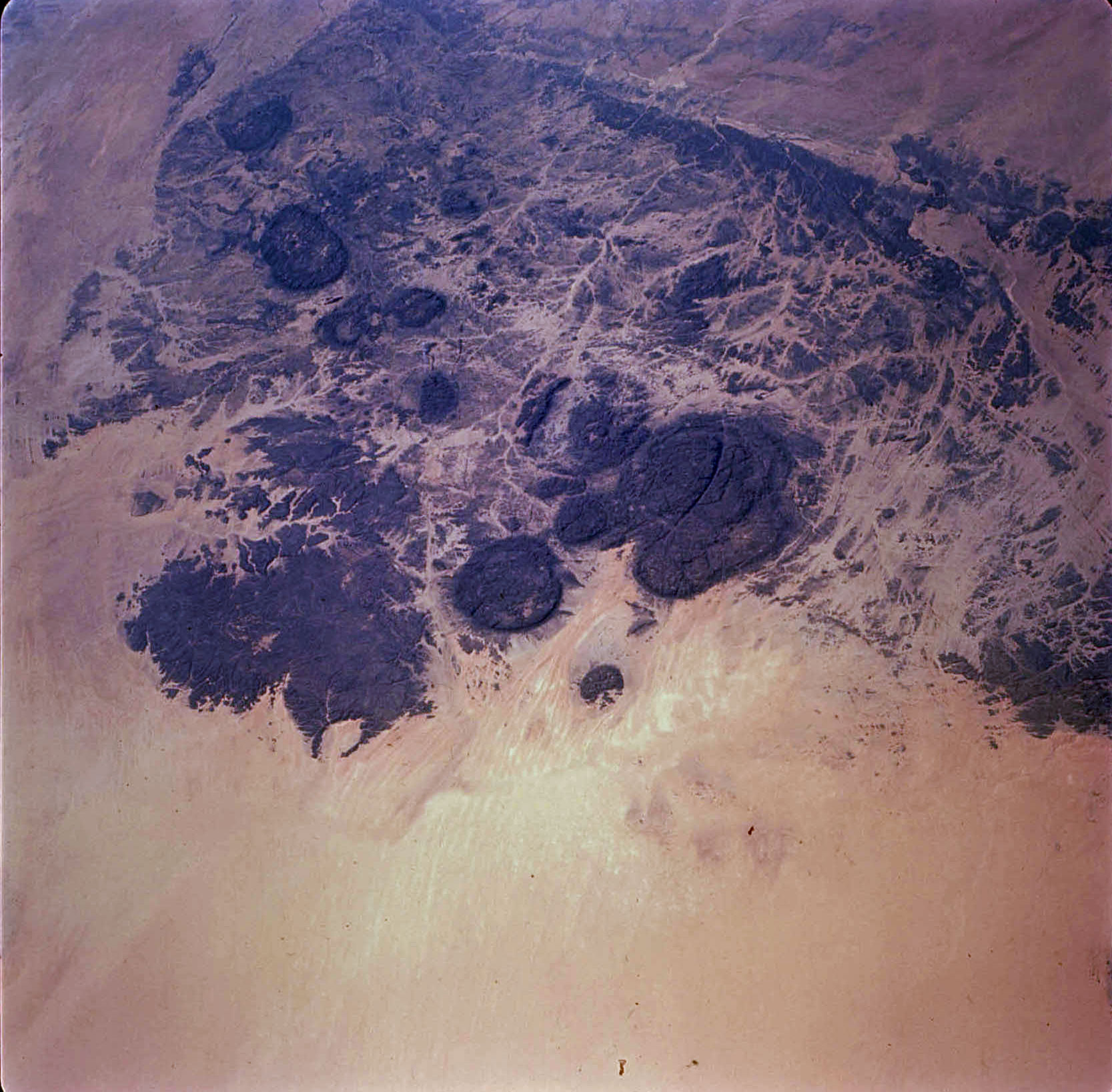
Circular granite massifs (dark areas). A volcanic crater can be seen at the lower left. NASA image approximately 130 km (81 mi) across.

== Climate ==
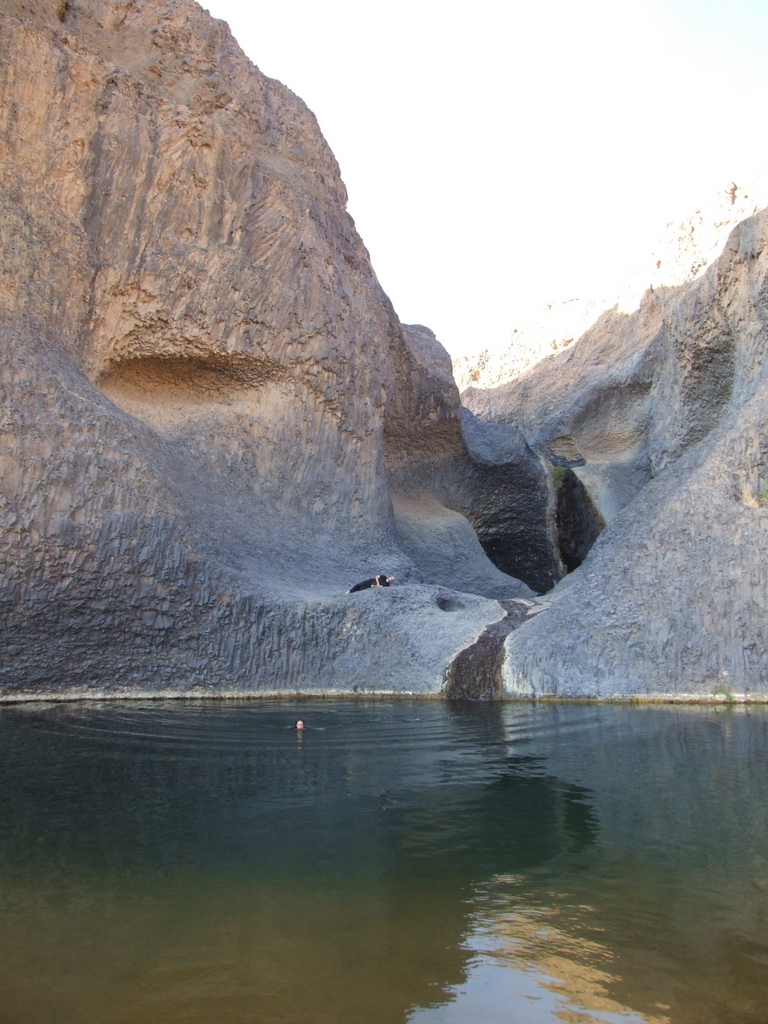
The Guelta near the town of Timia in central Aïr provides year-round water in an otherwise dry region.

Because of its altitude (on average between 500 and 900 m) and despite its low rainfall (50 to 160 mm/year on the lower plateau), the Aïr forms a green region in comparison with the surrounding deserts, especially after the August–September seasonal rains. The climate is classified as Sahel, like that of the regions well to its south. While the mountains are largely bare of vegetation, the dry wadi river valleys (known by the Hausa term "Kori") channel and hold rainwater in gueltas (stone pools, such as that near the town of Timia), creating oases which provide forage for animals, and in some areas, farming. The high Bagzane plateau of the central Aïr in particular provides adequate rainfall for intensive agriculture. Other, vast, areas of the region are entirely devoid of plant life and with their volcanic protrusions and rock fields present an otherworldly appearance.

== Vegetation ==
More than 430 vascular species have been recorded so far in the Aïr mountains. The location of the Aïr as a southern extension of the Hoggar mountain range makes it a connection between the Saharan Flora and the Sahelian Flora. However, the presence of mountains up to 2000 m a.s.l. generates locally favourable conditions for several species of the Sudanian zone and the Mediterranean zone.

During the 20th century a series of scientific missions in the Aïr has permitted to identify the majority of plant species developing in the Aïr. Vachellia tortilis, subsp. raddiana (afagag) and Balanites aegyptiaca (aborak) are among the most frequent tree species in the intermountain zone. In the vicinity of temporary rivers named koris, species like Vachellia nilotica, Faidherbia albida and the palm Hyphaene thebaica coexist with date palm cultivars (Phoenix dactylifera). Severe droughts and high aridity have made the intermountain zone of the Aïr a particularly harsh place for plants to develop. The additional presence of domestic herbivores has led to a severe deficit in tree regeneration, which has been cited as a major ecological concern. Tree regeneration has been observed enhanced as soon as tree seedlings are protected by large tussocks of the frequent grass Panicum turgidum. This positive interaction between plants represents a promising restoration tool to be used by local inhabitants.

In comparison, mountainous areas are even less documented. Tropical tree species less resistant to drought have been described in the highlands, among which the Fabaceae Senegalia laeta and Vachellia seyal. Quezel has observed the remnant presence of a rare endemic taxon related to the olive in the northern sector of the Aïr range. Recently, this taxon, Olea europaea subsp. laperrinei, has been found in other mountains of the Aïr: these very isolated, small populations represent the southern limit of the species distribution.

A study led on the slopes of the highest summit in the Aïr, Mont Idoukal-n-Taghès (2022 m a.s.l.), identified plant species that had never been inventoried in Niger before. Among them, Pachycymbium decaisneanum, Cleome aculeata, Echinops mildbraedii and Indigofera nummularia are tropical species with relatively low resistance to water stress, whereas Silene lynesii, Tephrosia elegans, and Echinops mildbraedii have a Saharan-Mediterranean distribution. Three ferns were found for the first time in the Aïr recently, Cheilanthes coriacea, Actiniopteris radiata, and Ophioglossum polyphyllum, suggesting that ferns may be more prone to develop in arid environments than commonly proposed. All these data evidence a marked mountain climatic specificity in the Aïr, with a positive impact on species richness and species diversity. Because of their strong geographic isolation within a Saharan matrix, these species have a high conservation value.

== Population ==
The town of Agadez in the heart of the Tuareg country is the capital of Aïr. Much of the Tuareg population of Aïr until recently led a nomadic life, relying essentially on camel and goats from which they take milk, meat and skins used in the production of local handicrafts. Most sedentary populations were either dependents of higher caste Tuareg pastoralists or the Ikelan (Bouzou in Hausa / Bella in Songhai), Tuareg slaves. These peoples were settled in northern oases, to tend the date palm plantations held by the noble clans.

Agriculture products from oases such as Timia, Aouderas and Tabelot are traditionally exchanged against clothes, or salt, brought by camel caravans (Azalai) from the remote Tenere oases of Bilma and Fachi to the east.

== History ==
The Aïr is known for its rock art, dating from 6000 BCE to around 1000CE. During the African humid period, the region was a pastoral area, as is illustrated by images of cattle and large mammals. During the 3rd millennium BC, however, a process of desertification began and the Tuareg from further north migrated into the region. Later art indicated war, depicting horses and chariots. In particular, the five-meter-high carvings of the "Dabous Giraffes" discovered in 1999 is internationally famous. Cave art in the region is predominantly stone carving, initially with sharp rock, and from around 1200 BC perhaps with metal.

When the Tuareg tribes were pushed south by Arab invaders in the eighth and ninth centuries, there were Gobirwa Hausa in the southern Aïr. Successive Tuareg Kels have controlled the area since at least the twelfth century. Agadez, as well as In-Gall to the east, were the farthest outposts of the Songhai Empire in the early 15th century. In the sixteenth century, the area fell under the newly created Tuareg Sultanate of Agadez, and remained so until the arrival of the French at the end of the 19th century.

The emergence of the French weakened the Tuareg Kels and provoked both infighting and resistance to colonialism. From the 1880s, Toubu raids increased, and when the Tuareg Ag Mohammed Wau Teguidda Kaocen rose against the French in 1917, many towns were destroyed on his way to the siege of Agadez. When the French retook Agadez, a brutal punitive expedition through the Aïr left many formerly populous places abandoned, razed by Kaosen and the French successively.

While the Kel Owey continued to dominate the settled oasis towns and pastoral herding, the sedentary farmers (Tuareg, Hausa, or Songhai) expanded farming and sedentary livestock cultivation in the mid-20th century.

The famines of the 1970s and 1980s brought an end to this expansion, and as Agadez and Arlit grew, the towns of the Aïr have shrunk. The first Tuareg rebellion of 1990-95 saw brutal government reprisals which depopulated many villages in the Aïr. Peace from the mid-1990s, as well as the uranium mines of Arlit brought unprecedented growth to the region, with many small towns gaining valuable tourism revenue. In 2004, a locust invasion ravaged many gardens, bringing scarcity and contributing to the Second Tuareg Rebellion of 2007–2009. Unrest continues in the region, effectively ending the nascent tourist industry.

== View ==
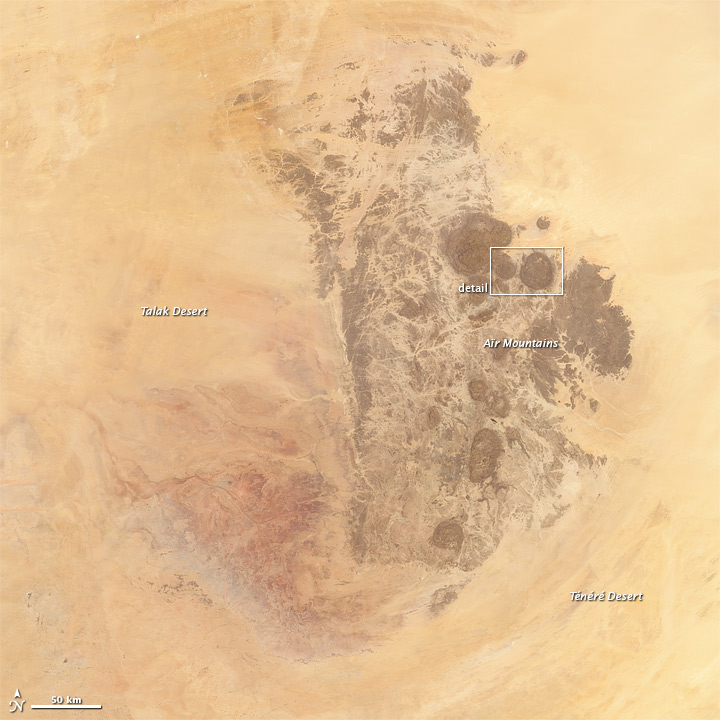
Annotated view, showing the Talak to the west and the Tenere desert to the east of the Air Mountains.

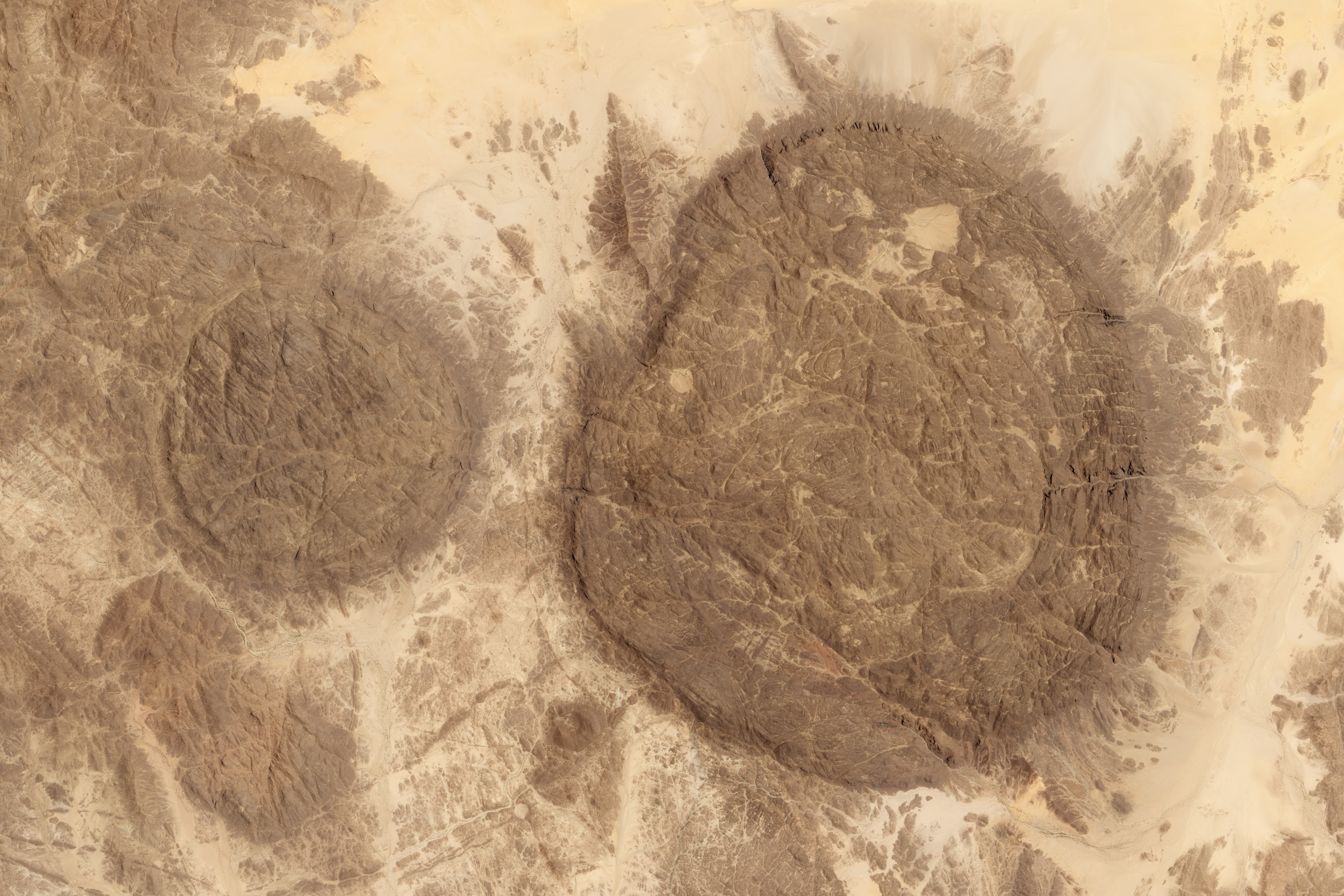
Inset of the image

== See also ==
- Aïr and Ténéré National Nature Reserve
- Ténéré
- World Heritage Sites in Danger
