= Guelta d'Archei =

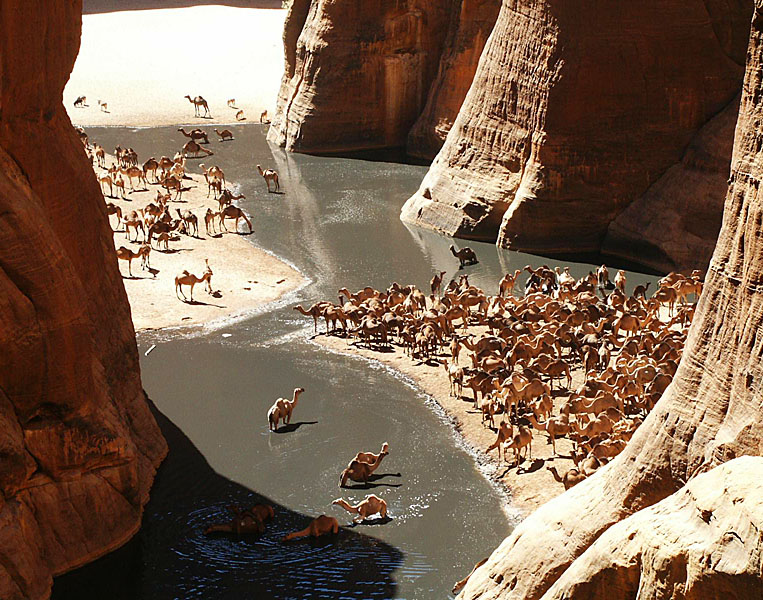
- Camels in the Guelta d'Archei
- Interactive map of Guelta d'Archei
- Location in Chad
- Coordinates: 16°54′17″N 21°46′29″E
- Country: Chad
- Time zone: UTC+1 (WAT)

The Guelta d'Archei is one of the most famous gueltas in the Sahara. It is located in the Ennedi Plateau, in north-eastern Chad, south-east of the town of Fada. The Guelta d'Archei is inhabited by several kinds of animals, most notably the West African crocodile (Crocodylus suchus; until recently thought to be a synonym for the Nile crocodile, Crocodylus niloticus Laurenti). Middle Holocene remains, as well as rock paintings, indicate that this species once thrived across most of today's Sahara Desert and in swamps and rivers along South Mediterranean shores. The small group of surviving crocodiles in the Guelta d'Archei represents one of the last colonies known in the Sahara today; the Tagant Plateau colony in Mauritania has likely been extinct since 1996.

Travel to the Guelta d'Archei is very difficult, as it is not serviced by paved roads. It is an approximately four-day 4×4 drive from the Chadian capital of N'Djamena.

Topographic Map of the Ennedi Plateau. The Guelta d'Archei is on the left, just below the center.
