= Talak, Niger =

Desert in Niger

Coordinates: 18.33°N 6°E

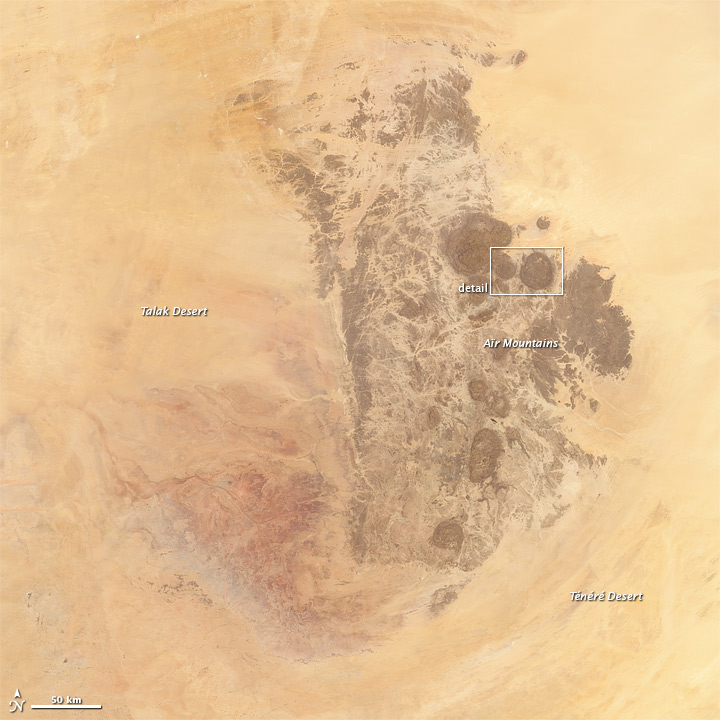
Annotated view

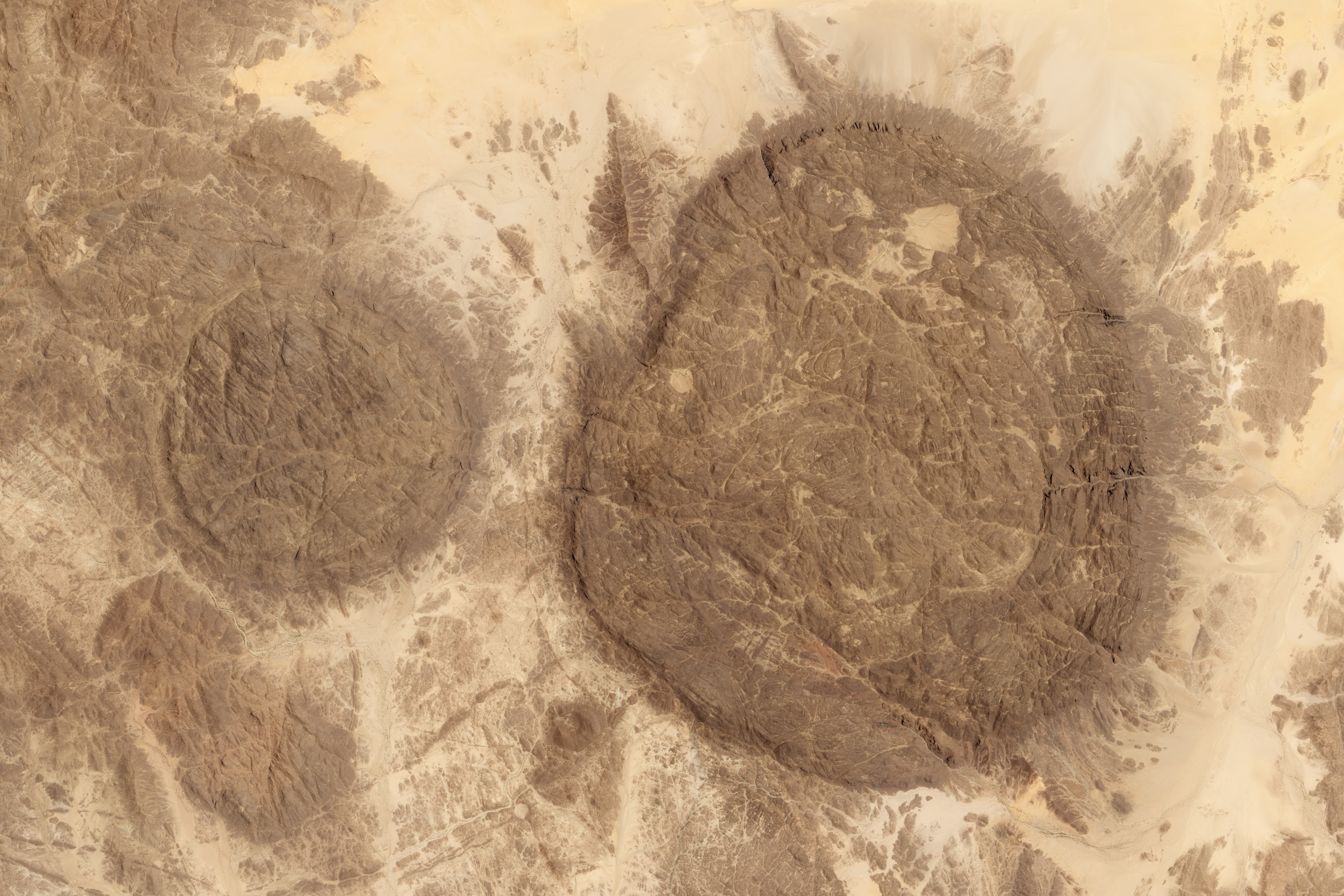
Inset of the above image

Talak is a sandy dune region in western Niger and it extends into Algeria and Mali. Talak Desert is a section of the Sahara Desert.

This area extensively watered by small waterways that empty into the Niger River makes it less barren than the rest of the vast desert area. The name means clay in the Tamashek language. Discoveries of dinosaur bones and fossils of now extinct flora and fauna have been made in the valleys of this region. The Talak region is about 100,000 square km. Eastern Talak is crossed by a trans-Saharan road, which links Algeria on the Mediterranean with Kano in Nigeria.
