= Guelta =

Pockets of water in the Sahara and Arabian deserts

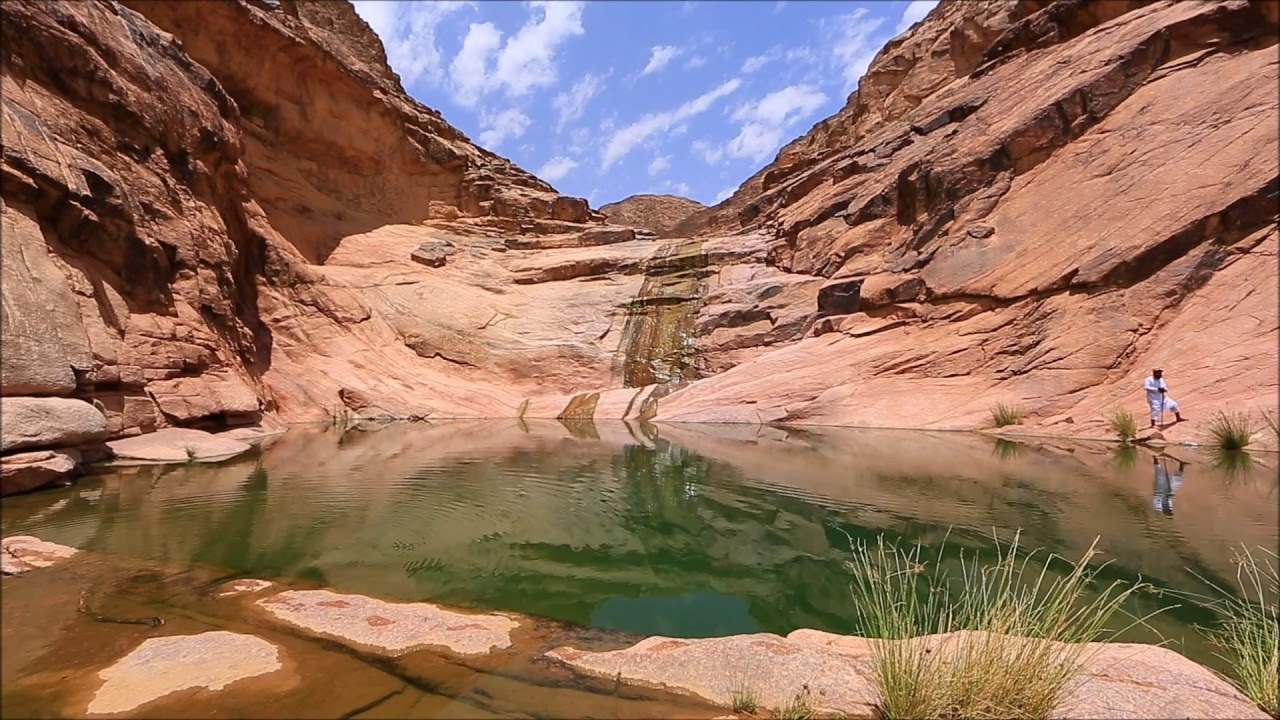
Juda'a Guelta, Hasat Qahtan, Saudi Arabia

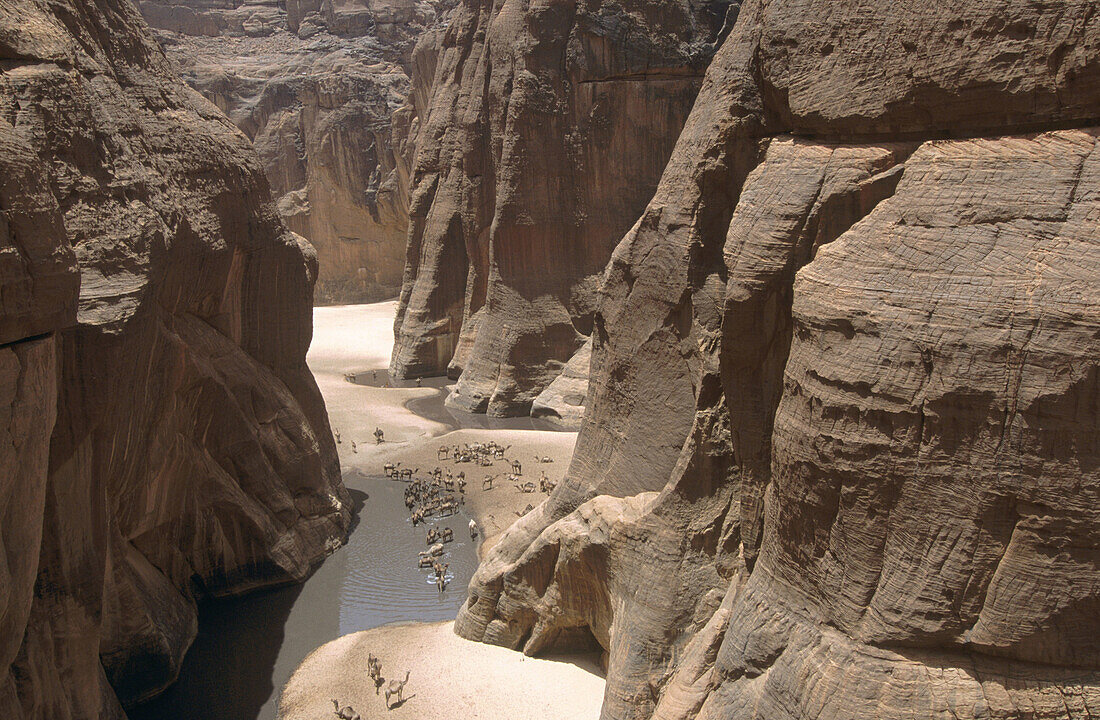
Guelta d'Archei, Ennedi Plateau, Chad

A guelta (Arabic: قلتة, also transliterated qalta or galta) is a pocket of water that forms within rock formations in the Sahara Desert and Arabian Desert. The term is of Arabic origin and specifically refers to oases that emerge in rocky landscapes in Arab regions, particularly in countries like Algeria and Saudi Arabia.

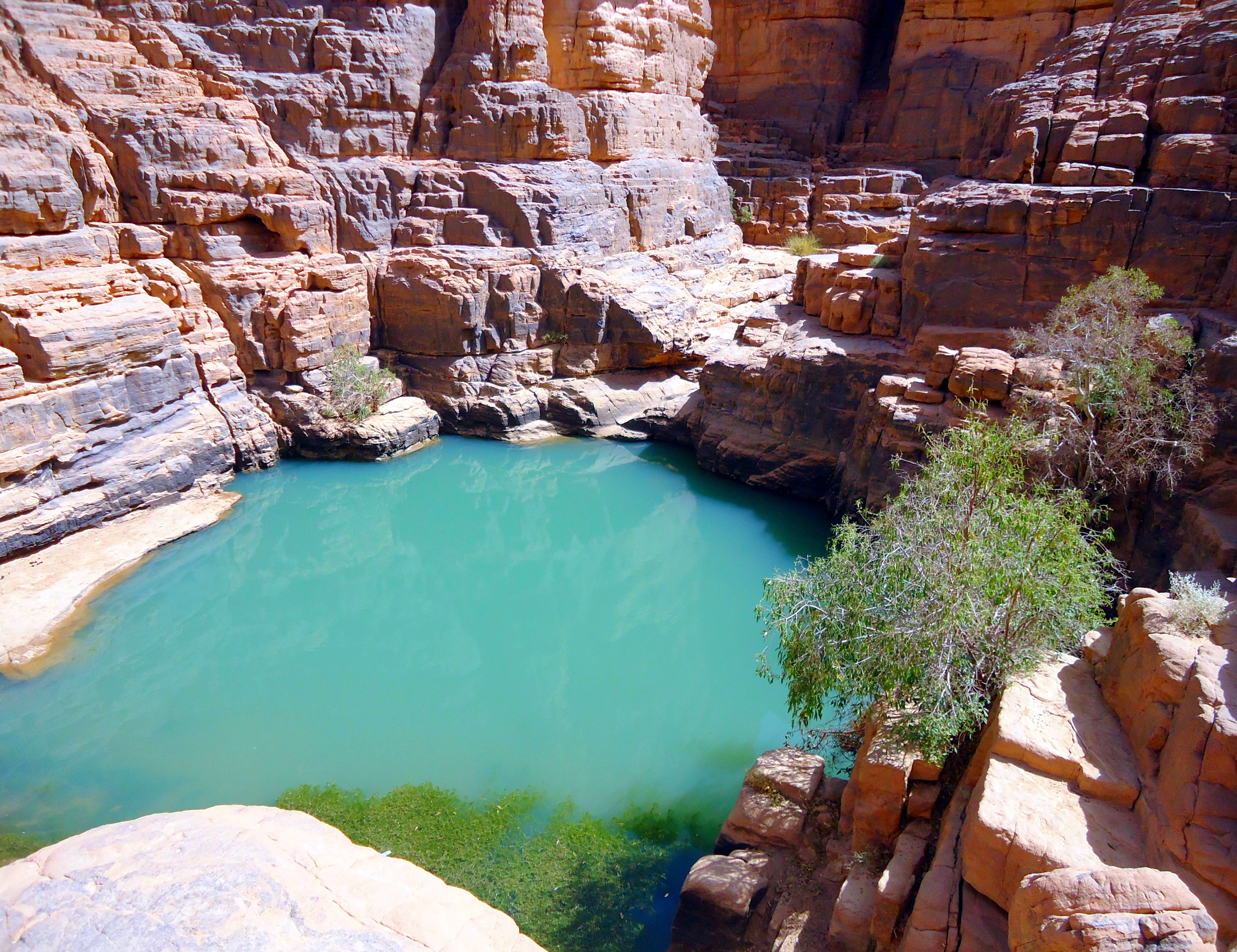
Guelta de Tikoubaouine, Tassili n'Ajjer, Algeria

A guelta is a natural water pool that forms in rocky basins and often serves as a crucial water resource in arid regions. It has been known in Arabic by other names, such as Waqb (a depression in the ground or rock). When multiple gueltas occur in close proximity, they are collectively called a Nadheem.

Gueltas are known for their ability to retain water for extended periods, sometimes throughout the year, especially if fed by springs. This makes them essential for survival in arid climates, where they can remain a source of water even during the dry season.

== Examples ==
- Uthaithiah Guelta (قلتة أثيثية) – Riyadh Province, Saudi Arabia
- Sayadah Guelta (قلتة صيادة) – Riyadh Province, Saudi Arabia
- Guelta d’Archei (قلتة آرشي) – Ennedi Plateau, Chad
- Afilal Guelta (قلتة أفيلال) – Tamanrasset, Algeria

== See also ==
- Billabong - term for a similar type of body of water in Australia
