= Ennedi Plateau =

Plateau located in the northeast of Chad

Ennedi Massif: Natural and Cultural Landscape
UNESCO World Heritage Site
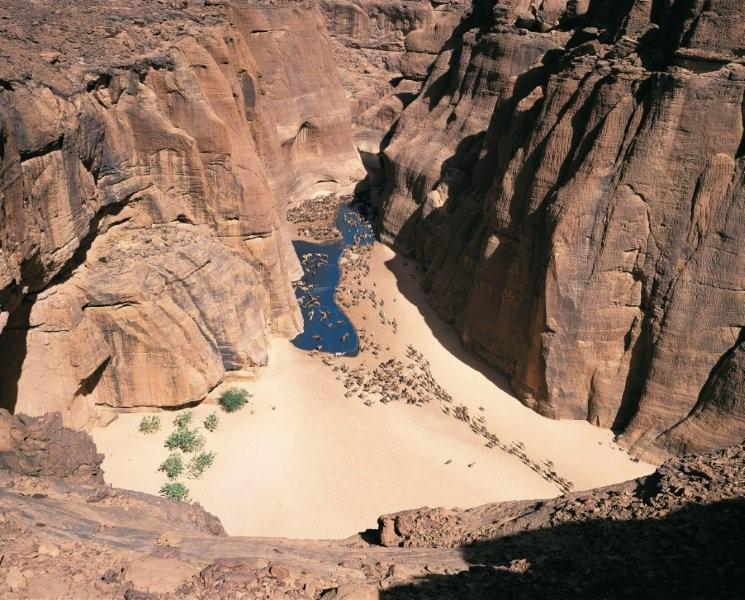
- Camels at a waterhole in a canyon in Ennedi (Guelta d'Archei)

- Location within Chad
- Location: Ennedi Region, Chad
- Criteria: Cultural and Natural: (iii), (vii), (ix)
- Reference: 1475
- Inscription: 2016 (40th Session)
- Area: 2,441,200 ha (6,032,000 acres)
- Buffer zone: 777,800 ha (1,922,000 acres)
- Coordinates: 17°2′30″N 21°51′46″E

Topographic Map of the Ennedi Plateau

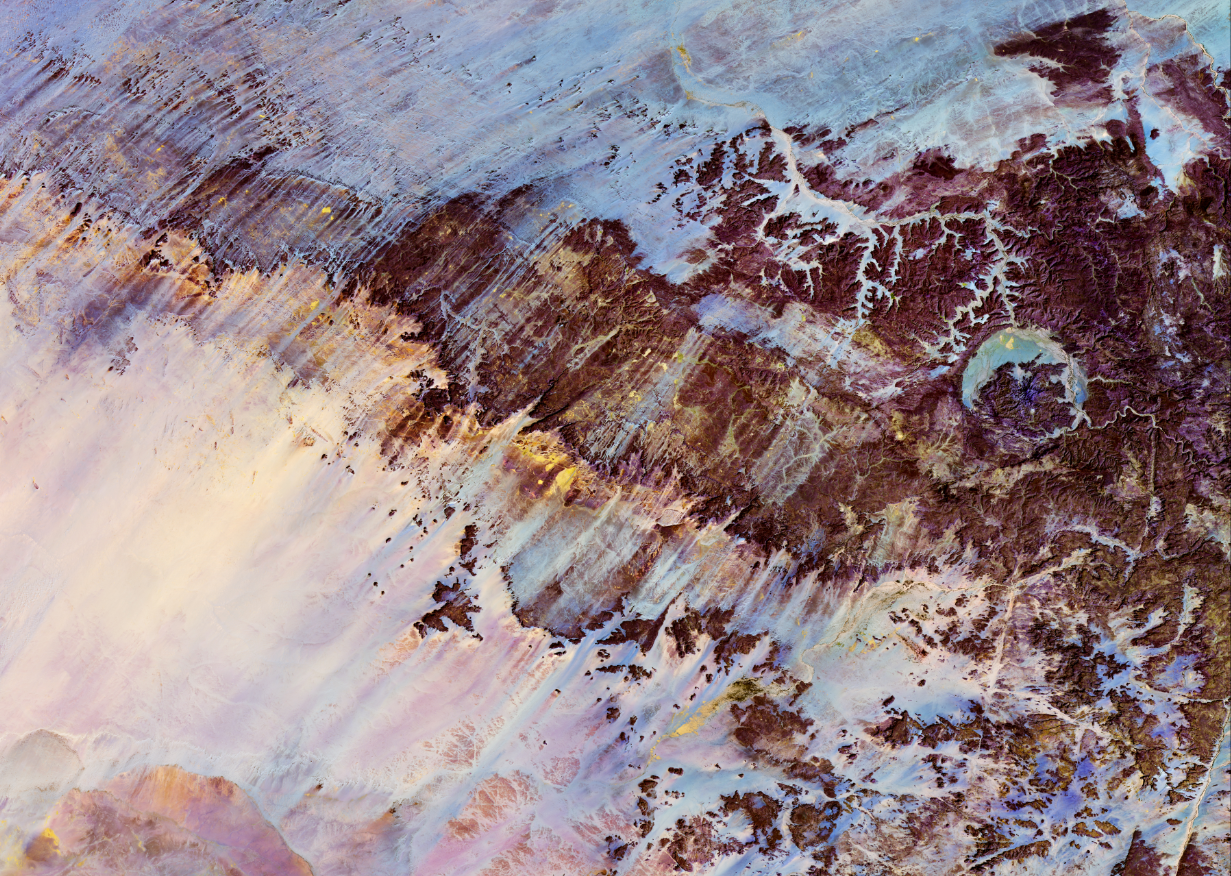
Landsat 8 image of Gweni-Fada crater in the Ennedi Plateau

The Ennedi Plateau is located in the northeast of Chad, in the regions of Ennedi-Ouest and Ennedi-Est. It is considered a part of the group of mountains known as the Ennedi Massif found in Chad, which is one of the nine countries that make up the Sahelian belt that spans the Atlantic Ocean to Sudan. The Ennedi is a sandstone bulwark in the middle of the Sahara, which was formed by erosion from wind and temperature. Many people occupied this area, such as hunters-gatherers (5,000-4,000 cal BC) and pastoralists (beginning 4,000 cal BC). The Ennedi area is also known for its large collection of rock art depicting mainly cattle, as these animals had the greatest financial, environmental, and cultural impact. This art dates back nearly 7,000 years ago. Today, two semi-nomadic groups, mainly Muslim, live in the Ennedi during the rainy months and pass through the area during the dry season. They rely on their herds of camels, donkeys, sheep, and goats to survive.

== Landscape and climate ==
The Ennedi makes up an area of approximately 60,000 km^{2} (23,000 sq mi), as large as Switzerland, and its highest point is approximately 1,450 m (4,760 ft) above sea level. The Massif is composed of sandstone overlaying a Precambrian granite base. In the Ennedi, there are at least twenty perennial or semi-perennial springs, gueltas (desert ponds), and pools, but they rarely reach greater than a few dozen meters in the dry season. It is considered part of the Sahelian Acacia savanna, which extends across the entire continent which once contained diverse ungulates whose population has since been reduced. The landscape has geological structures, including towers, pillars, bridges, and arches, which serve as major tourist attractions. Interestingly, much of the sand found in the Sahara is due to the generation of dust in the Tibesti-Ennedi triangle.

Evidence of a change in climate occurred between 6000 BP, with a savanna region with ~250 mm annual rainfall, to ~150 mm annual rainfall 4300 BP. It later reached an annual rainfall of 50 mm around 2700 BP, similar to the amount of annual rainfall observed today. There are also monsoons common in the area, generating around 50–150 mm of rain per year. These natural disasters create a diverse mixture of vegetation within the area. However, precipitation allows for greater moisture in the thin soil during the winter months, with lower run-off. The mountains are also known to have a north-Sahelian climate in the southern region, with greater amounts of precipitation between the months of May and September. The rainfall is subject to the Intertropical Convergence Zone (ITCZ).

== History of protection ==
Just under one-tenth of World Heritage Sites are in Africa, but the site was added to the UNESCO World Heritage Site in February 2016. During this process, there was much debate over what should be included. First of all, two administration zones and several villages had to reach agreement on whether it was considered a part of the World Heritage Site. However, its establishment has benefited Chad by increasing income in the area from tourists who spend money to stay. Also, the Chadian government eventually reduced the size of the protected area due to oil exploration. The Ennedi suffers from high income inequality, so the use of oil reserves has allowed for better redistribution of wealth. There is believed to have been a partnership contract between the State Party and oil companies for oil exploration and the private lease of land which have raised concerns regarding the reduced amount of protected area by UNESCO. As a result to this increase in oil exploitation, there have been accidental oil spills in Chad, leaving the contamination of groundwater, accidental chemical spills, and the reduction in air quality.

African Parks assumed management of this area in partnership with the Chadian government in early 2018. African Parks intends to improve the park's infrastructure and explore the potential for tourism to amass support for this landscape and to contribute to the needs of the local people. The European Union contributed €4.7 million to African Parks, and the Dutch Postcode Lottery gave around €3 million over three years to this organization. Furthermore, about 50,000 km^{2} (19,000 mi^{2}), a large portion of the Ennedi Plateau, was designated as the Ennedi Natural and Cultural Reserve by the Chadian government in January 2019.

The World Bank has also worked with the Chadians by recommending the oil-revenues-management-and-redistribution program, which states that “70% of direct oil revenues are to be allocated to priority sectors, 15% to public investments, 5% to the oil-producing department, and 10% to future generations.” However, the Chadian government has already been criticized for not abiding by the program.

== Geology ==
The plateau consists of Cambrian-Ordivician to Carboniferous sandstone on the north-facing Gondwana platform. The sandstone overlies the Pan-African basement consisting of granites, gneiss, or quartzite ridges. Glacial lineations, plus ridge-and-trough topography, record the Andean-Saharan glaciation.

== Fauna ==
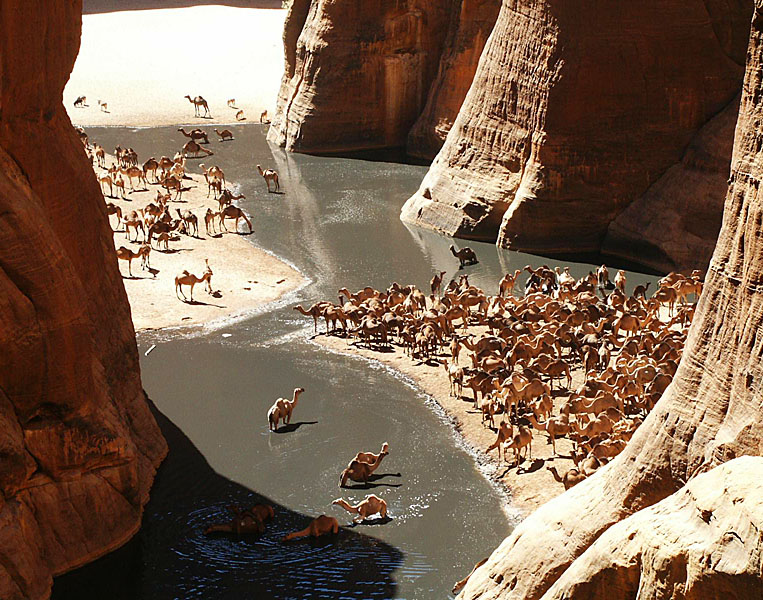
Camels in the Guelta d'Archei, a landmark in the plateau

Unfortunately, not a lot of studies have been conducted on Northern Chad due to security issues, harsh climatic conditions, wars, and banditry. However, researchers have found that due to a large reservoir in the area, the plateau has a rich collection of fauna. For example, there are at least 199 listed species of migratory birds that pass through the Ennedi. Other examples of fauna include the West African crocodile, also known as the desert crocodile, that once existed throughout the Sahara at a time of more abundant rainfall (see Neolithic Subpluvial). A striking characteristic of this population of crocodiles is dwarfism, which developed due to their isolation, making them unusual (other such remnant populations are or were found in Mauritania and Algeria). They survive in only a few pools in river canyons in the area, for example, the Guelta d'Archei, and are threatened with extinction. The last lions (West African subspecies) in the Sahara also survived here until they became extinct in the 1940s due to increased land use and hunting/poaching. Dorcas gazelles are still found in small numbers, but the two largest Saharan antelopes scimitar-horned oryx and addax were both hunted to extinction in Ennedi, the oryx was declared extinct in the wild in 2000, both species have been successfully reintroduced to Ouadi Rime-Ouadi Achim Faunal Reserve in central Chad, in December 2023 African Parks and Sahara Conservation, moved the first batch of 10 addax from OROA to Ennedi and released them into the reserve, more will be brought to Ennedi in the coming years, oryx reintroduction is also planned. Any surviving Sudan cheetah still alive in the wild are likely to be found in the remote regions of the Ennedi Plateau. Researchers used camera traps to identify an isolated population of North African ostrich that was discovered to still be living in the protected area. To bolster this population, African Parks rehomed 11 ostrich chicks from Zakouma National Park to the reserve. The chicks were kept in a holding facility until they reached adulthood, before being released into the greater area. There are currently 25 ostriches in Ennedi as of 2022. It has been suggested that the cryptid Ennedi tiger (a supposed surviving sabertooth cat) may also live there. Gazelles and antelopes are also known to be present in the area. Poaching and hunting have decreased the number of species in the area. Lastly, the discovery of the fish species P. senegalus and P. normani are of particular interest to researchers. The identification of these species in the Sahara desert shows the connection between the Ounianga lakes and Lake Chad. The researchers sampled during the day and the night with landing nets and other observations to conduct their study. Finally, there are only seven species of fish found in the Ennedi, according to researcher Daget.

== Flora ==
A total number of 2,173 species of flora are native to Chad, and some of the first flora researchers in the area back in the 1950s included R. Corti, H. Gillet, R. Maire, and P. Quézel. There are currently over 525 species of flora that have been listed in the Ennedi. Specifically, researcher Gillet used a classification system to describe 7 main life forms for the 526 species of flora found: 41.3% therophytes, 3.0% geophytes, 5.1% helophytes, 1.1% hydrophytes, 7.0% hemicryptophytes, 18.4% chamaephytes, 15.1% phanerophytes. Unusual species, including Rauwolfia afra, a type of tree typically found in tropical and equatorial Africa, is found in the Ennedi. Much of the vegetation is protected by the presence of deep canyons and gueltas. Only 2% of Chadian land is currently cultivated, about 50% is grazed, and cereal grains make up the main food groups. During arid periods, this site serves as a refuge for subtropical taxa, such as palms and grasses. The most common types of soils in Chad include Leptosols, Regosols, and Arenosols in the central and northern regions, and Fluvisols, Plinthosols, Planosols, Solonchaks, and Vertisols in the southern region. The Desert Locust is known for its deleterious impacts on the local flora, specifically crops and pastures.

== Culture ==
While there is a lack of absolute dates concerning the Ennedi rock art, the images can be dated from around 5000 BC onwards. The archaeological record and sites' rock art allow researchers to generate these dates because there is, unfortunately, a lack of organic materials. For instance, only one cattle jaw was found from around 630 BC. However, researchers continue to use radiocarbon dates from both charcoal and other cattle bones to age these sites. In addition, there are around six sites, and around 40 pictures have been found. Examples of petroglyphs or rock paintings have been found in the area, such as those at the "lost sight" of Niola Doa. Thousands of paintings and carvings of people and animals exist throughout the area and are estimated to be about 8,000 years old. Much of the art has been recognized with its great expression through color, with more than 86% of the art painted and 14% engraved. The art was found on the floors, on the ceilings, and the walls of shelters created by wind erosion, and they are often found in elevated positions.

=== Rock art ===
The artwork portrays both animals and humans as they are in real life, with little to no hunter-gatherer representation. Unfortunately, many of the paintings have deteriorated due to weathering and vandalism.

==== Significance ====
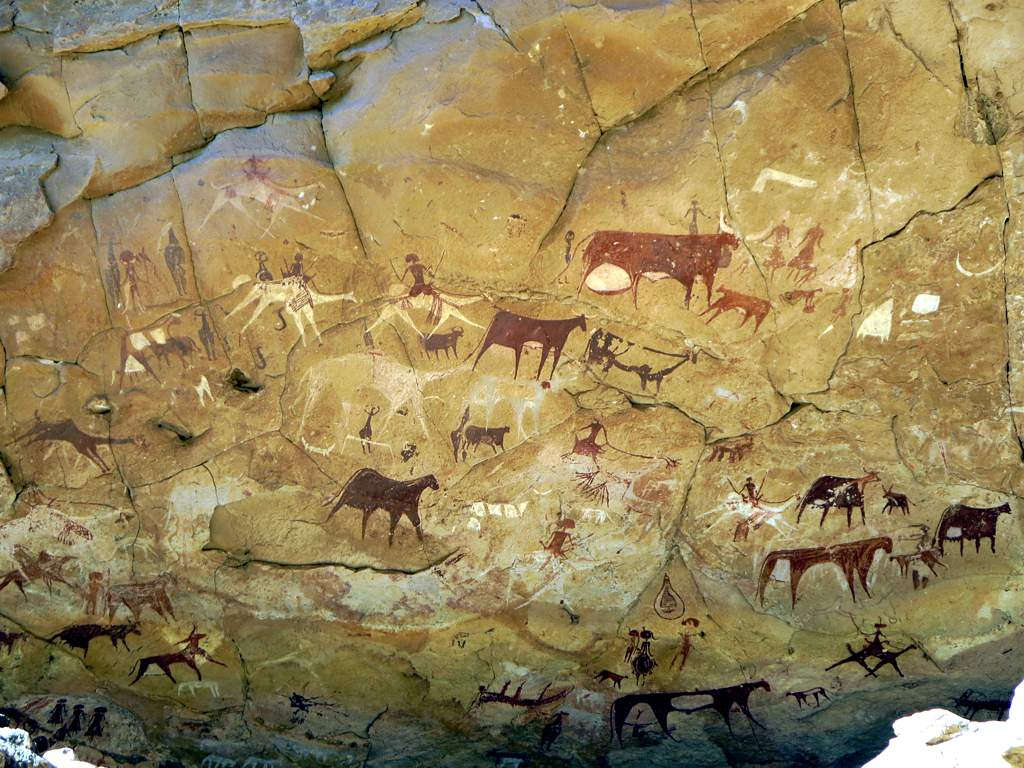
Rock paintings in Manda Guéli Cave in the Ennedi Mountains.

Early pictures were monochrome, representing people working with their livestock, and many were shown with hunting gear while walking and running. This portrayal emphasized the type of lifestyle people had during the early Iron Age, a period in Africa from around the second century AD until 1000 AD. As time progressed, images became much more colorful. Many more combative weapons were shown, which may have been due to intensified fighting due to distinguished hierarchies. A changing climate, due to decreased water and pasture, may have been indicated with these types of weapons.

==== Animals ====
Domesticated animals made up nearly 69% of the artwork depicted at Ennedi Plateau. However, the rock art had the greatest emphasis on domesticated cattle. In fact, at one site, Murdi, researchers graphed the frequency of humans and animals found among the rock art. Cattle consisted of over 50% of the total pictures, caprids around 10%, and dogs around 5%. The first rock picture ever discovered included the "Apollon Garamante," which showed two masked persons on the side of cattle. Cattle were perceived as having unique horns, especially among longhorn cattle which occupied a large population. For instance, some cattle were given lyre-shaped horns. Cattle were known to have a large financial, cultural, and environmental impact on the people of the Ennedi highlands. They were also given distinct coats to individualize these animals, and rock art at some sites, including the Chiguéou II site, includes cattle figures in extravagant geometric designs. Cattle were found all among the highlands, while other animals, such as horses, were not. Other types of domesticated animals found included sheep and dogs.

During the Iron Age, people survived on a more nomadic lifestyle, choosing to display camels and specifically horses in their pictures. However, these animals were not individualized with different coats as the cows were. Also, while paintings of cattle portray the animals as static, horses are shown as galloping animals, creating an artistic quality to the art. Some more recent paintings included horses with chariots. Horses are believed to not be exhibited in the artwork as much as other animals, such as cattle, due to a lesser influence on the pastoralists. Camels were also portrayed, as having more movement than the other animals.

Wild animals were also portrayed in the artwork for their religious and mythical meanings. Giraffes were the most common wild animals demonstrated, and they were most often expressed during hunter-gatherer times. Also, numerous rhinos were crafted alongside round-headed humans, unusual for the typical behavior of rhinos as they usually live as couples or loners.

==== People ====
Depictions of people are fairly common in Ennedi rock art, and among the human figures found, only 4% were engraved. There were numerous handprints from both men and women found among the rock art. Males are often exhibited as standing in front of cattle holding a lance and a shield, mainly seen as protecting their animals. Females are not portrayed as often as males. The graph mentioned previously that showed the frequency of humans and animals found that at the site Mundi, men were depicted 20% of the time, while women were only depicted 10%. However, women were often displayed as extravagantly decorated, such as those at Niola Dola. They were often covered in wavy lines and interesting geometric patterns, and these designs have been compared to Round Head-style figures found in Algeria.

At sites like Nabara 2, located on the base of the north-face of the Saodomanga, oval engravings depict fauna like camels, cattle, and giraffes. Warriors are seen hiding behind round shields, and women are donned in long dresses. Females are not accompanied by weapons, while the men typically are.

Another major site, Niola Doa, which means "The place of the girls," in the local language, is no longer considered under UNESCO protection, yet is known as one of the most important rock sites in the Sahara. Many figures appear to be naked, with smaller figures adorning skirts, and some were seen as having a genetic condition known as steatopygia, which is caused by an accumulation of fat in the thighs and the buttocks.

=== Pottery ===
During 5,000-4,000 cal BC, the Ennedi people worked as hunting, fishing, and gathering groups mainly on the plains. They mainly remained in settlement sites due to favorable conditions. Pottery vessels used at these sites included dotted wavy-line patterns unique to this period.

As time progressed until around 4,000 cal BC, hunting and gathering societies shifted to cattle-herding. With a shift in lifestyle, pottery styles changed as well. For instance, vessels now had much more decorative patterns, and different shapes of pots were created. Also, certain stone tools emerged for the first time, including axes.

Lastly, due to increased aridity from 3,000-2,000 BC, there were more established settlements, as well as a greater amount of herding with mainly small livestock. The pottery exhibited geometric patterns for the first time, and stone tools included mainly just retouched flakes and grinding material.

== Major sites ==
- As mentioned previously, Niola Doa is not technically considered under the protection of UNESCO. However, it is still well-known for its extravagant rock art. It is found in the North East of Fada, which is the only town in the Ennedi Region. Rock art ranged from 8000 BP to 2000 BP.
- The Archei Region is found in the Southeast of Fada, and it contains an ancient waterhole; therefore, it is considered the center of Nomadic life in the Ennedi. It has painted art over 8000 years old. Manda Guéli, found in the Archei Region, with some of the most well-preserved artwork due to its high position, preventing weathering.
- Ehi Tighi, a rock formation known for a 3m long Archaic cow painting, was believed to be used as a refuge from slave hunters. There are depictions of both white and red creatures on the walls of the formation, including both men and women, as well as cows with distinct coat decorations.
- The Bachikele canyon and guelta of the Ennedi is extremely important ecologically for the region; it contains flora that is not found in any other areas of the Sahara and the Sahel.

== Research and outreach ==
As rock art depictions have shown, there has been a decrease in fauna over time due to climatic changes, but also due to hunting and poaching. While the decrease in fauna has been a large issue in the area, vandalism has also taken a large toll on the site. For instance, suspected local youths defaced rock art at the Ennedi rock art site by scrawling their names on the art in French and Arabic, with the latest inscription from January 2017. Chad's minister of culture, Mahamat Saleh Haroun, described the situation, "It's an African story and they wanted to destroy that." While the head of UNESCO in Chad Abdelkerim Adoum Bahar believes the damage can be repaired, other organizations have since become involved. For example, the Trust for African Rock Art, in partnership with the Factum Foundation, has since documented Ennedi through photographs; their mission is to show the issues involved in protecting rock art. Due to both erosion and vandalism, the Ennedi has faced deterioration, but this art has now been recorded in 3D to raise awareness about the beauty of this site. Films have also been made about this landscape, including Towers of the Ennedi, directed by Renan Ozturk to show the beauty of the Ennedi.
