= Assodé =

Abandoned town in Niger

Coordinates: 18.456°N 8.600°E

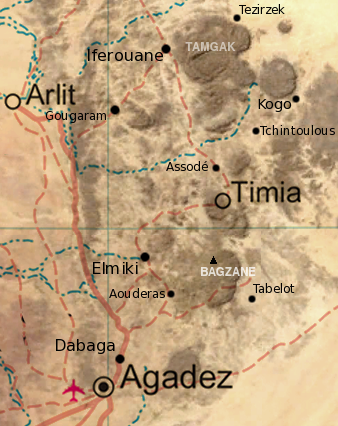
Map of the southern Aïr Mountains.

Assodé was a town in the Aïr Mountains in what is now northern Niger. Founded around the eleventh century, it was long the most important Tuareg town, benefiting from trans-Saharan trade, and declining with it from the eighteenth century. It was abandoned soon after being sacked by the Tuareg forces during the Kaocen revolt of 1917, although many of its buildings are still reasonably well preserved. It remains a tourist destination.
