= Agadez =

City in Agadez Region, Niger

Agadez اغادیز
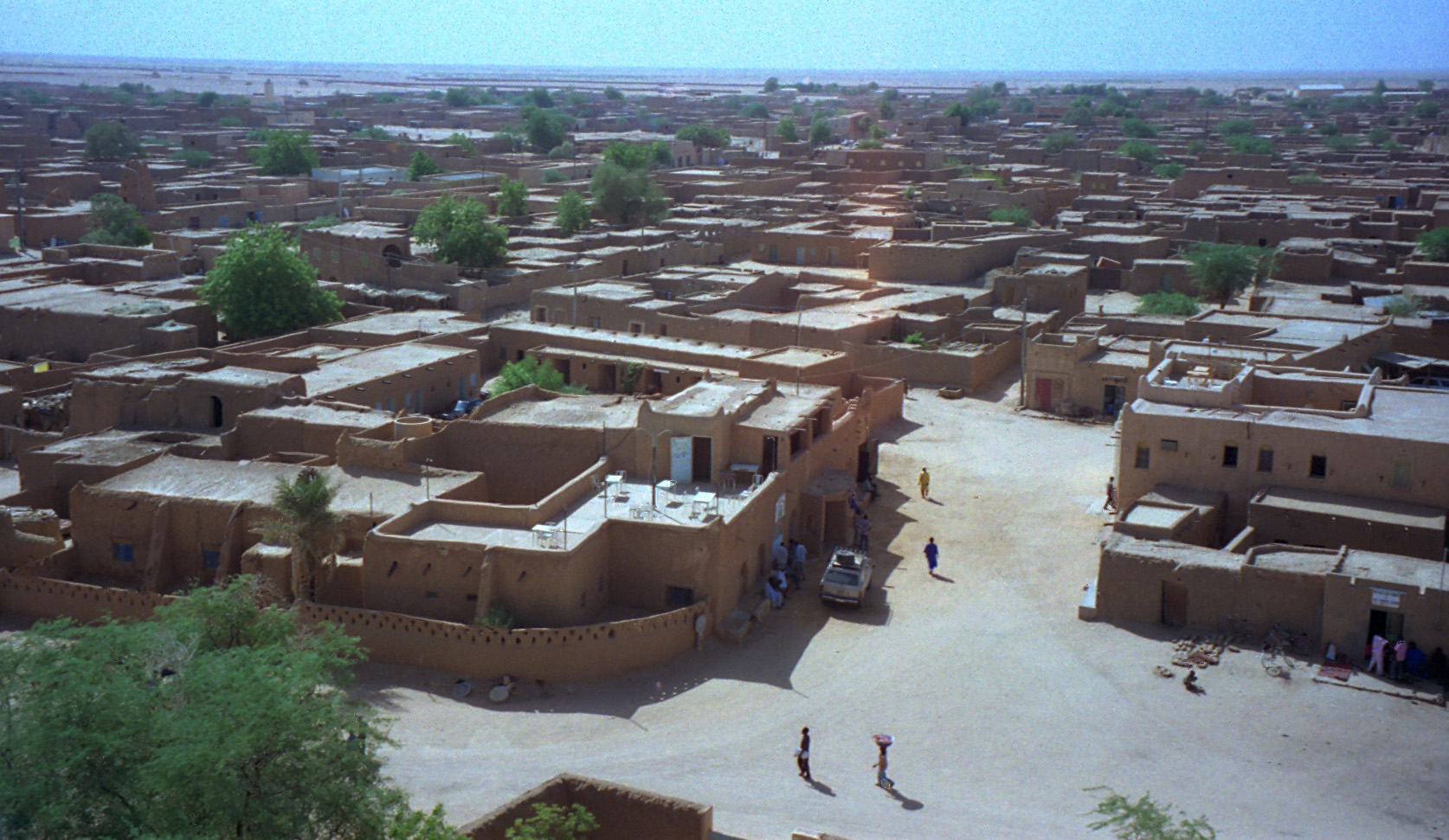
- View of Agadez, from a minaret (1997)

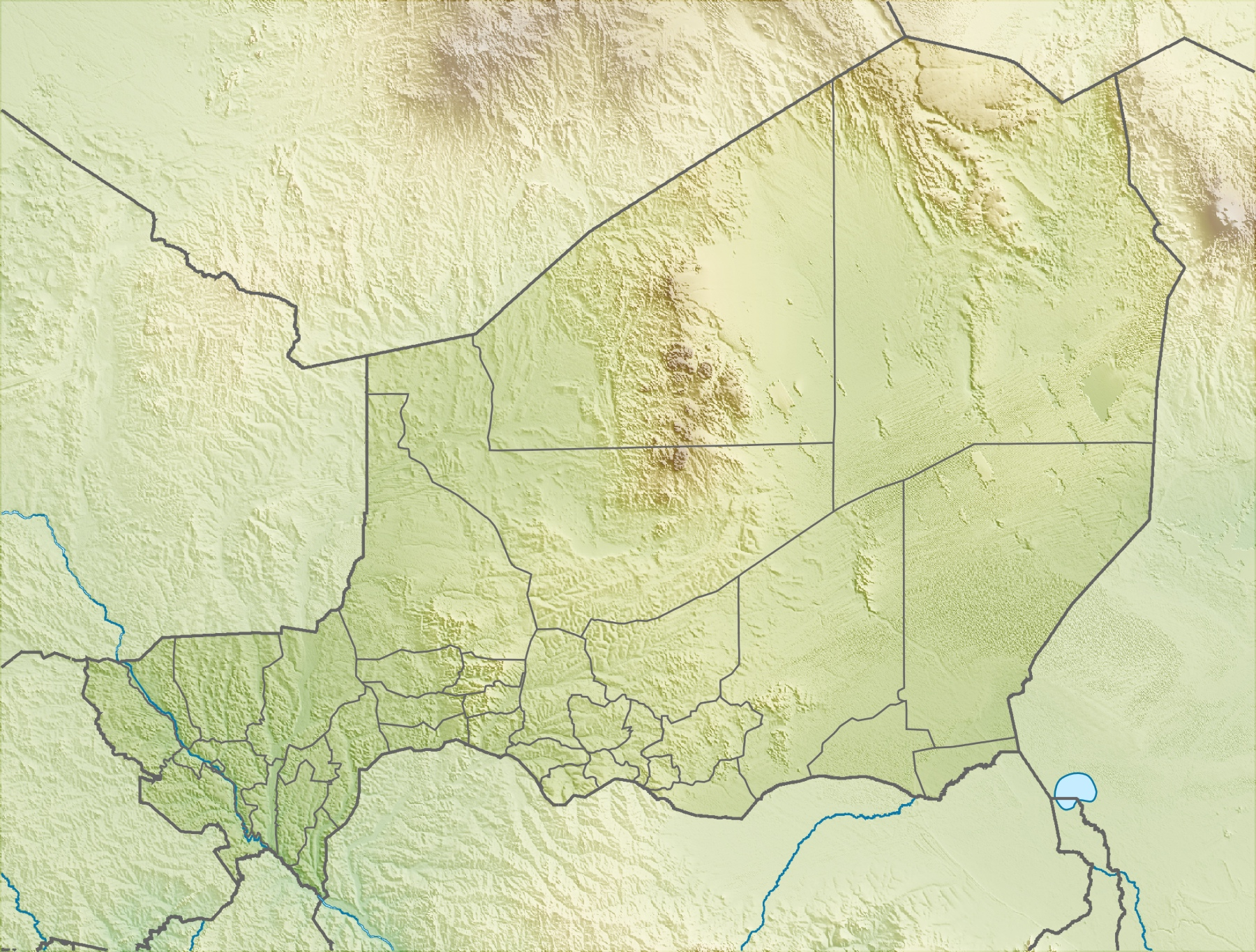
- Location within Niger
- Coordinates: 16°58′20″N 07°59′27″E
- Country: Niger
- Region: Agadez Region
- Department: Tchirozerine Department
- Commune: Agadez
- Sultanate: 1449 CE

Government
  - Mayor: Rhissa Feltou
- Elevation: 520 m (1,710 ft)

Population (2012 census)
  - Total: 110,497
- Time zone: UTC+1

UNESCO World Heritage Site
- Official name: Historic Centre of Agadez
- Criteria: Cultural: ii, iii
- Reference: 1268
- Inscription: 2013 (37th Session)
- Area: 77.6 ha (192 acres)
- Buffer zone: 98.1 ha (242 acres)

Topographic Map of the Aïr mountains. Agadez is located at the bottom of the map.

Agadez (Air Tamajeq: ⴰⴶⴰⴷⴰⵣ, Agadaz), formerly spelled Agadès, is the fifth largest city in Niger, with a population of 110,497 based on the 2012 census. The capital of the eponymous Agadez Region, the city lies in the Sahara desert, and is also the capital of the Sultanate of Agadez, one of the traditional Tuareg–Berber federations. The historic centre of the town has been designated a World Heritage Site by UNESCO.

== History ==
Agadez was founded before the 14th century, and, by growing around trans-Saharan trade, gradually became the most important city of the Tuareg people, supplanting Assodé. The city still sees the arrival of caravans bringing salt from Bilma.

In 1449 Agadez became a sultanate, but was later conquered by the Songhai Empire in 1515, remaining a part of that empire until 1591. At this point, the city had a population of around 30,000 people. By then, the city was a key passage for the medieval caravans trading between the West African cities of Kano (the source of the Hausa language which is the traditional lingua franca of different ethnic groups in the city, especially in the area of trade, religion and administration) and Timbuktu, and the North African oases of Ghat, Ghadames, and Tripoli, on the Mediterranean shore. Internal fighting led to the gradual decline of the sultanate, and by the mid-19th century the town was a shadow of its former self.

Some contend that Agadez was the furthermost extent of the Ottoman Empire on the African continent until the 19th century, before being occupied by the French colonial empire, though this claim has not been verified by historians. The city was ruled by the French from 1906. A rebellion by Kaocen Ag Mohammed occurred in 1916, but was defeated by French forces. The French, unable to effectively administer this remote region, ruled semi-indirectly via a restored sultan. Later, Agadez became an important location in the Tuareg Rebellion of the 1990s in central and northern Niger.

=== 2007 violence ===
As a result of the Second Tuareg Rebellion, sporadic violence and the displacement of thousands of people affected the Agadez area from late 2007 into 2009. All of northern Niger was placed on the United States State Department list of areas which are unsafe for travel by United States citizens, covering late 2007 to the end of 2008. Tourist flights to Agadez were suspended by European airlines for the 2007–2008 tourist season (September – March). The burgeoning tourist industry, which prior to 2007 had surpassed that of Niamey and the rest of the nation, essentially came to an end. The entire region was placed under a Nigerien government State of Exception (limiting travel, gatherings, political activities, etc.) in October 2007, renewed through early 2009. Roads to and from Agadez were reported to have been mined, and the government closed the area to international journalists and aid organizations. An unknown number (reported as several thousands) of internally displaced people converged on the city as a result of the unrest.

=== Emigration towards Europe ===
In the 2010s, Agadez became a major transit town for West African migrants heading to Libya and then on to Europe, since Agadez is the final stop before passing through the long trek across the Sahara towards the Libyan coast. Crackdowns in 2016 slowed the flow of migrants, but recent Displacement Tracking Matrix data showed a daily average of 1,212 individuals crossing at six monitored points in Niger, many of whom would have been coming through Agadez. The city now hosts hundreds of migrants living in small houses on the outskirts of the city before moving on to Libya.

== Demographics ==
Historical population
Year	Pop.	±%
1977	20,643	—
1988	49,424	+139.4%
2001	77,060	+55.9%
2012	110,497	+43.4%

== Culture and tourism ==
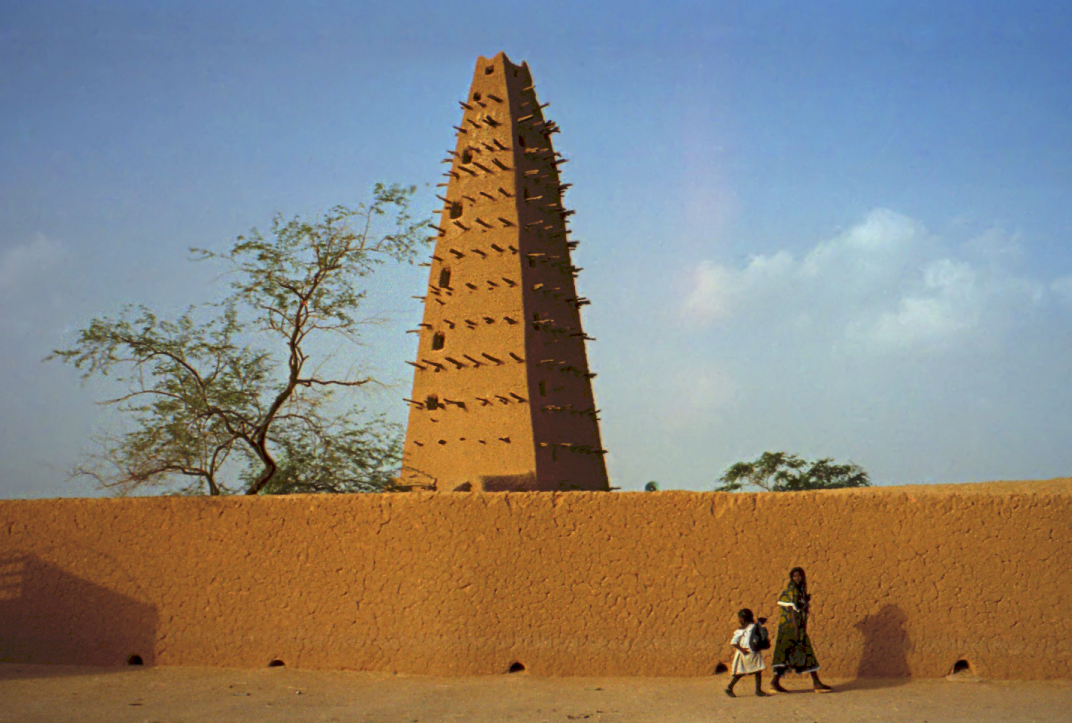
The Grand Mosque

Today, Agadez flourishes as a market town and as a centre for the transportation of the uranium mined in the surrounding area. Notable buildings in the city include the Agadez Grand Mosque (originally dating from 1515 but rebuilt in the same style in 1844), the Kaocen Palace (now a hotel), and the Agadez Sultan's Palace. The city is also known for its camel market and its silver and leatherwork. Its name is given to a form of Tuareg symbolic jewellery, the Agadez Cross.

Some well-known musicians from the town include Tuareg guitar player Bombino and his band Group Bombino, and Group Inerane. Mdou Moctar's film, Akounak Teggdalit Taha Tazoughai, is set and filmed on location in Agadez.

== Airport and military usage ==
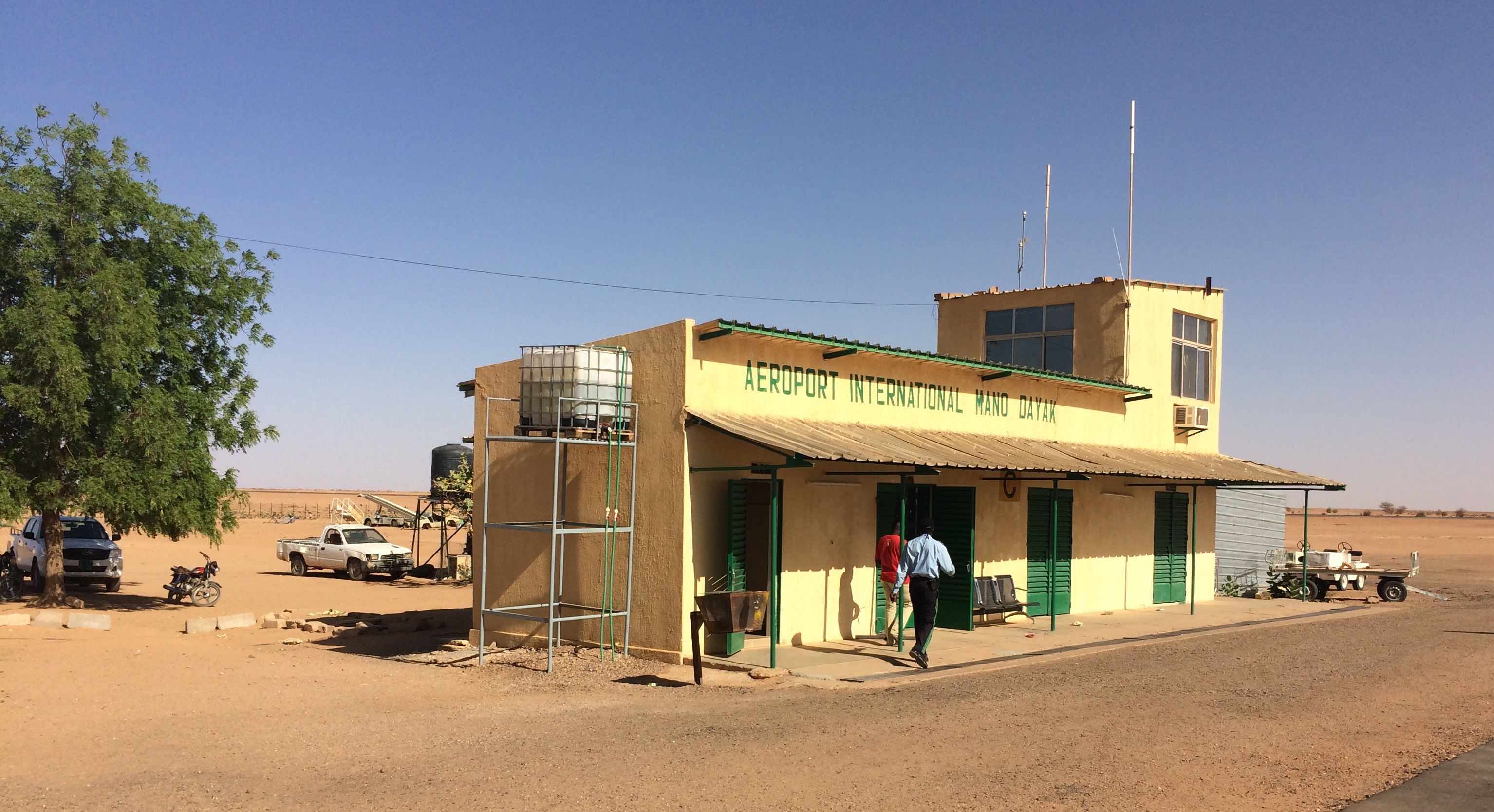
Mano Dayak International Airport

Agadez's air transport hub, Mano Dayak International Airport, was named after Mano Dayak, the Tuareg leader who is native to the region.

The United States built Nigerien Air Base 201, a dedicated drone airbase in Agadez from which it can more easily monitor terrorist activities in West and North Africa, and the Sahel. It was revealed in 2016 that the military base in Niger cost the U.S. $100 million.

== Air pollution ==
Air pollution, including particulate matter and dust, poses significant health risks due to their microscopic size and potential inhalation into the deepest parts of the lung.

== Climate ==
Agadez has a hot desert climate (Köppen climate classification BWh).

Climate data for Agadez, Niger (1961-1990 normals, extremes 1957-present)
Month	Jan	Feb	Mar	Apr	May	Jun	Jul	Aug	Sep	Oct	Nov	Dec	Year
Record high °C (°F)	40.0 (104.0)	41.1 (106.0)	46.0 (114.8)	45.8 (114.4)	47.0 (116.6)	49.1 (120.4)	48.0 (118.4)	44.7 (112.5)	47.0 (116.6)	42.6 (108.7)	40.0 (104.0)	39.9 (103.8)	49.1 (120.4)
Mean daily maximum °C (°F)	27.9 (82.2)	31.1 (88.0)	35.0 (95.0)	39.2 (102.6)	41.3 (106.3)	41.3 (106.3)	39.1 (102.4)	37.9 (100.2)	38.9 (102.0)	37.1 (98.8)	32.4 (90.3)	29.0 (84.2)	35.8 (96.4)
Daily mean °C (°F)	19.8 (67.6)	22.5 (72.5)	26.7 (80.1)	31.2 (88.2)	33.7 (92.7)	33.8 (92.8)	32.1 (89.8)	31.0 (87.8)	31.7 (89.1)	29.4 (84.9)	24.3 (75.7)	21.0 (69.8)	28.1 (82.6)
Mean daily minimum °C (°F)	11.7 (53.1)	13.9 (57.0)	18.3 (64.9)	23.1 (73.6)	26.0 (78.8)	26.4 (79.5)	25.1 (77.2)	24.2 (75.6)	24.5 (76.1)	21.7 (71.1)	16.2 (61.2)	12.8 (55.0)	20.3 (68.5)
Record low °C (°F)	4.2 (39.6)	5.5 (41.9)	8.0 (46.4)	12.6 (54.7)	17.8 (64.0)	18.6 (65.5)	17.8 (64.0)	15.2 (59.4)	16.0 (60.8)	8.6 (47.5)	5.5 (41.9)	3.4 (38.1)	3.4 (38.1)
Average precipitation mm (inches)	0.0 (0.0)	0.0 (0.0)	0.1 (0.00)	2.0 (0.08)	5.5 (0.22)	10.4 (0.41)	35.2 (1.39)	49.7 (1.96)	8.2 (0.32)	0.3 (0.01)	0.0 (0.0)	0.0 (0.0)	111.5 (4.39)
Average precipitation days (≥ 1.0 mm)	0.0	0.0	0.0	0.1	0.7	1.9	5.6	6.2	1.5	0.0	0.0	0.0	16.2
Average relative humidity (%)	22	18	15	14	18	24	39	45	29	20	22	23	24
Mean monthly sunshine hours	297.6	280.0	294.5	288.0	297.6	270.0	288.3	285.2	285.0	306.9	303.0	294.5	3,504
Percentage possible sunshine	86	87	80	77	75	69	72	73	79	85	90	86	80
Source 1: NOAA
Source 2: DWD (precipitation days 1951-1990, humidity 1973-1994)

== Neighborhoods ==
- Nasarawa, near the Agadez Mosque
- Sabon Gari
- Bariki
- Dag Manet
- Azin

== See also ==
- Protests at UNHCR humanitarian center in Agadez
