= Communes of Niger =

The departments of Niger are subdivided into communes. As of 2005, in the seven regions and one Capital Area, there were 36 départements, divided into 265 communes, 122 cantons and 81 groupements. The latter two categories cover all areas not covered by Urban Communes (population over 10000) or Rural Communes (population under 10000), and are governed by the Department, whereas Communes have (since 1999) elected councils and mayors. Additional semi-autonomous sub-divisions include Sultanates, Provinces and Tribes (French: tribus). The Nigerien government estimates there are an additional 17000 villages administered by Rural Communes, while there are over 100 quartiers (boroughs or neighborhoods) administered by Urban Communes.

The territorial reorganisation of Niger's local administration, known informally as the Decentralisation process, was carried out through a series of laws from 1998 to 2005. Most importantly:

- The Constitution of 9 August 1999;
- Law n°98-032 of 14 September, determining the statutes for Communautés Urbaines;
- Law n°2001-023 of 10 August 2001, creating the administrative boundaries and Territorial Collectivities (French: collectivités territoriales);
- Law n° 2002-017 of 11 June 2002, determining the independent administration of Regions, Departments, and Communes, as well as their obligations and resources;
- Law n° 2002-014 of 11 June 2002, for the creation of the Communes and the fixing of their boundaries and seats (French: chefs-lieux).
- Since 2011 there are 63 departments and four cities

While often translated as "town", Nigerien communes are simply the third-level administrative subdivision of the country. These can be classified Urban or Rural communes, and while often identical in territory to the administrative unit of a town or city, all areas of the country fall within a commune. The communes are listed below, by department.

== Abala Department ==
- Abala
- Sanam

== Abalak Department ==
- Abalak
- Akoubounou
- Azeye
- Tabalak
- Tamaya

== Aderbissinat Department ==
- Aderbissinat

== Aguie Department ==
- Aguié
- Tchadoua

== Arlit Department ==
- Arlit
- Dannet
- Gougaram

== Ayourou Department ==
- Ayourou
- Inates

== Bagaroua Department ==
- Bagaroua

== Balléyara Department ==
- Tagazar

== Banibangou Department ==
- Banibangou

== Bankilare Department ==
- Bankilare

== Belbédji Department ==
- Tarka

== Bermo Department ==
- Bermo
- Gababedji

== Bilma Department ==
- Bilma
- Dirkou
- Djado
- Fachi

== Bkonni Department ==
- Birni-N'Konni
- Doguerawa
- Galmi
- Malbaza
- Sabonga

== Boboye Department ==
- Birni N'Gaouré
- Fabidji
- Fakara
- Harikanassou
- Kankandi
- Kiota
- Koygolo
- N'Gonga

== Bosso Department ==
- Bosso
- Toumour

== Bouza Department ==
- Allakaye
- Babankatami
- Bouza
- Deoule
- Karofane
- Tabotaki
- Tama

== Dakoro Department ==
- Adjekoria
- Azagor
- Bader Goula
- Birni Lalle
- Dakoro
- Dan-Goulbi
- Korahane
- Kornaka
- Maiyara
- Roumboui
- Sabon-Machi
- Tagriss

== Damagaram Takaya Department ==
- Albarkaram
- Damagaram Takaya
- Guidimouni
- Mazamni
- Moa
- Wame

== Diffa Department ==
- Chetimari
- Diffa
- Gueskerou

== Dioundiou Department ==
- Dioundiou
- Karakara
- Zabori

== Dogondoutchi Department ==
- Dan-Kassari
- Dogondoutchi
- Dogonkiria
- Kieche
- Matankari
- Soucoucoutane

== Dosso Department ==
- Dosso
- Farey
- Garankédey
- Gollé
- Goroubankassam
- Kargiubangou
- Mokko
- Sambéra
- Tessa
- Tombokoirey I
- Tombokoirey II

== Dungass Department ==
- Dogo-Dogo
- Dungass
- Gouchi
- Malawa

== Falmey Department ==
- Falmey
- Guilladje

== Filingue Department ==
- Filingué
- Imanan
- Kourfeye
- Tondikandia

== Gaya Department ==
- Bana
- Bengou
- Gaya
- Tanda
- Tounounga
- Yelou

== Gazaoua Department ==
- Gangara
- Gazaoua

== Gothèye Department ==
- Dargol
- Gothèye

== Goudoumaria Department ==
- Goudoumaria

== Goure Department ==
- Alakoss
- Boune
- Gamou
- Goure
- Guidiguir
- Kelle

== Guidan Roumdji Department ==
- Chadakori
- Guidanroumdji
- Guidan Sori
- Sae Saboua
- Tibiri

== Iferouane Department ==
- Iferouane
- Timia

== Illela Department ==
- Badaguichiri
- Illela
- Tajae

== In-Gall Department ==
- In-Gall

== Keita Department ==
- Garhanga
- Ibrohamane
- Keita
- Tamaske

== Kollo Department ==
- Kollo
- N'Dounga
- Bitinkodji
- Fakara
- Hamdallay
- Karma
- Kirtachi
- Kouré
- Liboré
- Namaro

== Loga Department ==
- Falwel
- Loga
- Sokorbe

== Madarounfa Department ==
- Dan-Issa
- Djiratawa
- Gabi
- Madarounfa
- Safo
- Sarkin Yamma

== Madaoua Department ==
- Azarori
- Bangui
- Galma Koudawatche
- Madaoua
- Ourno
- Sabon-Guida

== Maine-soroa Department ==
- Foulatari
- Mainé-Soroa
- N'Guelbély

== Magaria Department ==
- Bande
- Dantchiao
- Kwaya
- Magaria
- Sassoumbroum
- Wacha
- Yekoua

== Malbaza Department ==
- Doguerawa
- Malbaza

== Maradi Department ==
- Communauté Urbaine de Maradi
  - Commune de Maradi I
  - Commune de Maradi II
  - Commune de Maradi III

== Matameye Department ==
- Dan-Barto
- Daouche
- Doungou
- Ichirnawa
- Kantche
- Kourni
- Matameye
- Tsaouni
- Yaouri

== Mayahi Department ==
- Attantane
- El Allassane Maireyrey
- Guidan Amoumoune
- Issawane
- Kanan-Bakache
- Mayahi
- Sarkin Haoussa
- Tchake

== Mirriah Department ==
- Dogo
- Droum
- Gaffati
- Gouna
- Hamdara
- Kolleram
- Mirriah
- Zermou

== N'Gourti Department ==
- N'Gourti

== N'guigmi Department ==
- Kablewa
- N'guigmi

== Niamey ==
Communauté Urbaine de Niamey (CUN) includes five Urban Communes and 99 Quarters, each with elected representatives (délégués de commune) to the Council of the Communauté Urbaine de Niamey.

- Commune de Niamey I : 20 quarters;
- Commune de Niamey II : 17 quarters;
- Commune de Niamey III : 17 quarters;
- Commune de Niamey IV : 17 quarters;
- Commune de Niamey V : 28 quarters .

== Ouallam Department ==
- Dingazi
- Ouallam
- Simiri
- Tondikiwindi

== Say Department ==
- Say
- Ouro Gueladjo
- Tamou

== Tahoua Department ==
- Affala
- Bambeye
- Barmou
- Kalfou
- Takanamat
- Tebaram

== Tahoua City Department ==
- Communauté Urbaine de Tahoua
  - Commune de Tahoua I
  - Commune de Tahoua II

== Takeita Department ==
- Dakoussa
- Garagoumsa
- Tirmini

== Tanout Department ==
- Gangara
- Falanko
- Ollelewa
- Tanout
- Tenhya

== Tassara Department ==
- Tassara

== Tchin-Tabaraden Department ==
- Kao
- Tchintabaraden

== Tchirozerine Department ==
- Dabaga
- Tchirozerine
- Tabelot
- Agadez

== Téra Department ==
- Téra
- Gorouol
- Kokorou
- Dargol
- Diagourou

== Tesker Department ==
- Tesker

== Tessaoua Department ==
- Baoudetta
- Hawandawaki
- Koona
- Korgom
- Maijirgiu
- Ourafane
- Tessaoua

== Tibiri Department ==
- Douméga
- Guéchémé
- Koré Maïroua
- Tibiri

== Tillaberi Department ==
- Tillabéri
- Anzourou
- Ayorou
- Dessa
- Kourteye
- Sinder

== Tillia Department ==
- Tillia

== Torodi Department ==
- Makalondi
- Torodi

== Zinder Department ==
- Communauté Urbaine de Zinder
  - Commune de Zinder I
  - Commune de Zinder II
  - Commune de Zinder III
  - Commune de Zinder IV

== See also ==
- Departments of Niger
- Regions of Niger
