= Dakoro Department, Niger =

Dakoro
- Department
- Dakoro Department, Niger location in the region
- Coordinates: 14.510°N 6.765°E
- Country: Niger
- Region: Maradi Region

Area
  - Total: 4,140 sq mi (10,730 km^{2})

Population (2012 census)
  - Total: 630,421
  - Density: 152.2/sq mi (58.75/km^{2})
- Time zone: UTC+1 (GMT 1)

Dakoro is a department of the Maradi Region in Niger. Its capital lies at the city of Dakoro. As of 2012, the department had a total population of 630,421 people.

== Communes ==
- Adjekoria
- Azagor
- Bader Goula
- Birni Lalle
- Dakoro
- Dan-Goulbi
- Korahane
- Kornaka
- Maiyara
- Roumboui
- Sabon-Machi
- Tagriss
