= Matameye =

- Commune and town
- Location in Niger
- Coordinates: 13°24′00″N 8°36′00″E
- Country: Niger
- Region: Zinder
- Department: Matameye

Area
  - Commune and town: 257.5 km^{2} (99.4 sq mi)
- Elevation: 422 m (1,385 ft)

Population (2012)
  - Commune and town: 64,988
  - Density: 252.4/km^{2} (653.7/sq mi)
  - Urban: 27,615
  - Summer (DST): UTC+1 (WAT)

Matameye is a town and urban commune, administrative centre of the Matameye Department in Niger, with a total population of 64,988 as of 2012 with 27,615 living in the town. In 2005 a road was completed from Matameye to Takieta. Since 2011 many people have moved to Matameye from Tânout and Gouré because of the food crisis, in search for better harvests, abandoning their homes and schools.

== Geography ==
Matamèye is located at the transition from the Greater Sudan to the Sahel region. The neighbouring municipalities are Doungou and Ichirnawa to the north, Dogo to the east, Kourni and Yaouri to the south and Kantché and Tsaouni to the west.

The municipality of Matamèye consists of an urban and a rural municipal area. The urban area is divided into nine neighbourhoods. These are called Abidjan, Kanguiwa, Limanawa, Marni, N'Wala, Sabon Gari, Zangouna, Zangouna Matamey and Zangouna Hayin Mota. The settlements in the rural municipal area comprise 35 villages and 41 hamlets.

== History ==
During the French colonial period, Matamèye was initially an insignificant pastoral village in the canton of Kantché. In 1954, the traditional cantonal capital of Kantché was to become the seat of a colonial official who was to administer the newly created district of Kantché. However, as the local cantonal chief of Kantché did not want this superior in the same village, he had his official residence set up in Matamèye, seven kilometres away. The small village thus unexpectedly became the district capital. In 1964, the district of Matamèye became the arrondissement of Matamèye. As such, the arrondissement capital benefited from several newly created infrastructural facilities such as a health centre, schools and a large weekly market. This was accompanied by strong population growth.

== Economy ==
The inhabitants practise agriculture, livestock farming and forestry as well as trade and crafts. Sugar cane in particular is traded at the market in Matamèye, which is sold as far away as the capital Niamey.
