= Matameye Department =

Coordinates: 13°32′21″N 8°27′46″E

Matameye
- Department
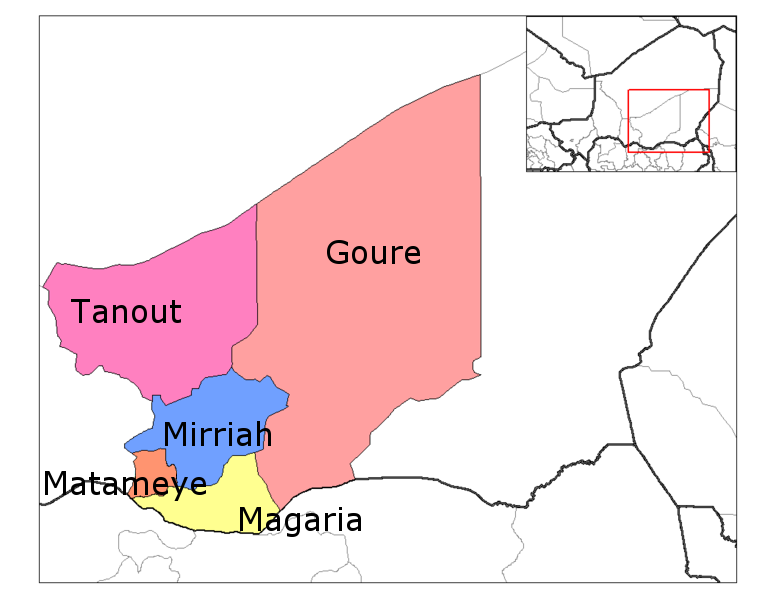
- Matameye Department location in the region
- Country: Niger
- Region: Zinder

Area
  - Total: 849 sq mi (2,198 km^{2})

Population (2012)
  - Total: 399,181
  - Density: 470.4/sq mi (181.6/km^{2})
- Time zone: UTC+1 (GMT 1)

Matameye is a department of the Zinder Region in Niger. Its capital lies at the city of Matameye. The chief town lies 72 km from Magaria. It also includes the town of Kantché. As of 2012, the department had a total population of 399,181 people.

== Communes ==
- Dan-Barto
- Daouche
- Doungou
- Ichirnawa
- Kantche
- Kourni
- Matameye
- Tsaouni
- Yaouri
