= Madarounfa Department =

Coordinates: 13°18′31″N 7°09′21″E

Madarounfa
- Department
- Madarounfa Department location in the region
- Country: Niger
- Region: Maradi Region

Area
  - Total: 1,415 sq mi (3,666 km^{2})

Population (2012)
  - Total: 448,863
  - Density: 317.1/sq mi (122.4/km^{2})
- Time zone: UTC+1 (GMT 1)

Madarounfa is a department of the Maradi Region in Niger. Its capital is Madarounfa. As of 2012, the department had a total population of 448,863 people.

== Communes ==
- Dan-Issa
- Djiratawa
- Gabi
- Madarounfa
- Safo
- Sarkin Yamma
