= Mayahi Department =

Coordinates: 14°06′N 7°36′E

Mayahi
- Department
- Mayahi Department location in the region
- Country: Niger
- Region: Maradi Region

Area
  - Total: 2,538 sq mi (6,573 km^{2})

Population (2012 census)
  - Total: 557,186
- Time zone: UTC+1 (GMT 1)

Mayahi Department (var. Mayaki) is a department of the Maradi Region in Niger. Its capital lies at the city of Mayahi. In the mid-1990s, the Department (then titled an Arrondissiment) had a population of 125,000, with 2,200 in Mayahi town. As of 2012, the department had a total population of 557,186 people.

== Communes ==
- Attantane
- El Allassane Maireyrey
- Guidan Amoumoune
- Issawane
- Kanan-Bakache
- Mayahi
- Sarkin Haoussa
- Tchake
