= Yaouri =

Coordinates: 13°15′51″N 8°33′50″E

- Commune and village
- Interactive map of Yaouri
- Country: Niger
- Region: Zinder
- Department: Matamèye

Area
  - Total: 288.3 km^{2} (111.3 sq mi)

Population (2012 census)
  - Total: 50,732
  - Density: 176.0/km^{2} (455.8/sq mi)
- Time zone: UTC+1 (WAT)

Yaouri is a village and rural commune in Matameye Department in Niger.

== Geography ==
Yaouri is located at the segue of the Sudan region to Sahel. The neighbouring communes are Matameye to the north, Dogo to the east, Bande to the southeast, Kwaya to the south, Sassoumbroum to the southwest and Kourni to the west. The commune area is divided into 28 administrative villages, 29 traditional villages, 40 hamlets and six camps. The main town of the rural commune is the administrative village of Yaouri.

== History ==
The rural commune of Yaouri was organised during the 2002 administrative reform from the part of the territory of Kantche commune.

== Population ==
In the 2001 census, Yaouri had 24,793 inhabitants. In 2012, the commune had 50,732 inhabitants. Yaouri is home to Fula people subgroup of Daourawa, who mainly engage in agropastoralism.

== Economy and infrastructure ==
The community is located in the narrow zone along the border with Nigeria, stretching from Tounounga in the west to Malawa in the east, where irrigated agriculture for cash crops is practised.
