= Boboye Department =

Department in Niger

Coordinates: 13°04′54″N 2°54′39″E

Boboye
- Department
- Boboye Department location in the region
- Country: Niger
- Region: Dosso

Area
  - Total: 1,180 sq mi (3,056 km^{2})

Population (2016 census projection)
  - Total: 293,620
  - Density: 248.8/sq mi (96.08/km^{2})
- Time zone: UTC+1 (GMT 1)

Boboye is a department of the Dosso Region in Niger. It is located in southwestern Niger, at the border of Benin. Its capital lies at the city of Birni N'Gaouré. As of 2016, the department had a estimated population of 293,620 people.

== Geography ==
The department is located within the Dallol Bosso, a wide fossil valley. The department takes its name from the valley; in Zarma, Dallol Bosso is known as Boboye.

Boboye experiences a dry season for two-thirds of the year (October to May) and a wet season for one-third of the year (June to September).

== Communes ==
- Birni N'Gaouré
- Fabidji
- Fakara
- Harikanassou
- Kankandi
- Kiota
- Koygolo
- N'Gonga
