= Madaoua Department =

Coordinates: 14°04′33″N 5°57′31″E

Madaoua
- Department
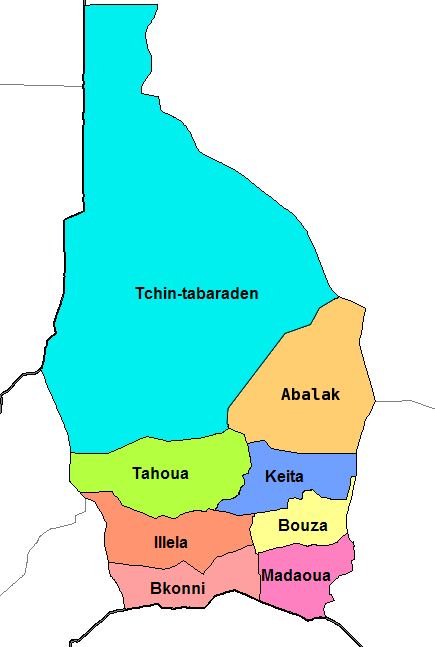
- Madaoua Department location in the region
- Country: Niger
- Region: Tahoua Region
- Departmental: Madaoua

Area
  - Total: 4,498 km^{2} (1,737 sq mi)

Population (2012)
  - Total: 545,538
  - Density: 121.3/km^{2} (314.1/sq mi)
- Time zone: UTC+1 (GMT 1)

Madaoua is a department of the Tahoua Region in Niger. Its capital lies at the city of Madaoua. As of 2012, the department had a total population of 545,538 people.

== Communes ==
- Azarori
- Bangui
- Galma Koudawatche
- Madaoua
- Ourno
- Sabon-Guida
