= Damagaram Takaya Department =

Damagaram Takaya
- Department
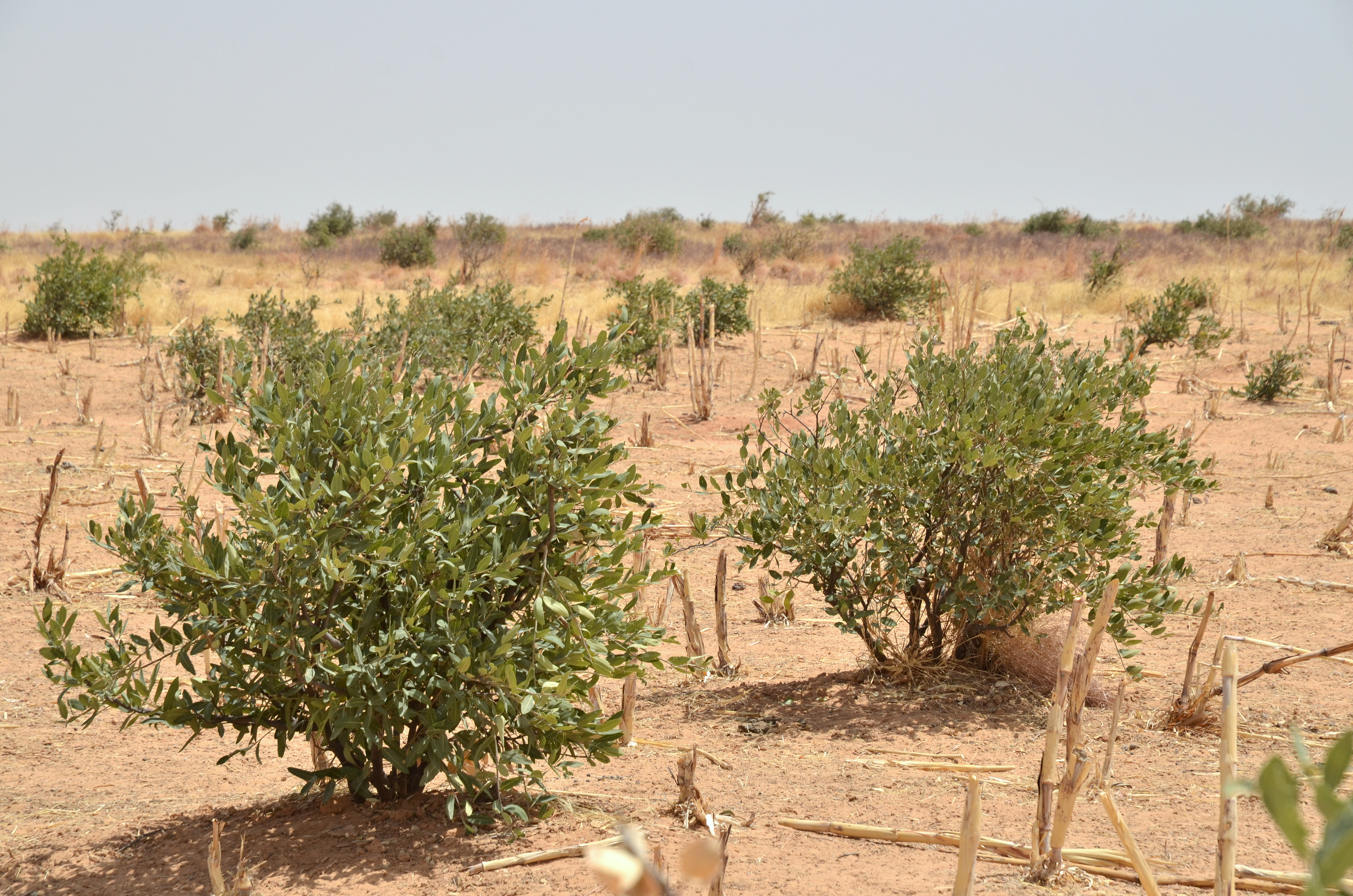
- Landscape
- Interactive map of Damagaram Takaya
- Country: Niger
- Region: Zinder Region

Area
  - Total: 2,000 sq mi (5,181 km^{2})

Population (2012)
  - Total: 241,169
  - Density: 120.6/sq mi (46.55/km^{2})
- Time zone: UTC+1 (GMT 1)

Damagaram Takaya is a department of the Zinder Region in Niger. Its administrative seat is the city of Damagaram Takaya. As of 2012, the department had a total population of 241,169 people.

== History ==
The department dates back to the administrative post (poste administratif) of Damagaram Takaya, which was established in 1964. In 2011, the administrative post was separated from the department of Mirriah and elevated to the department of Damagaram Takaya.

== Municipalities ==
Damagaram Takaya Department is divided into six municipalities, listed with population as of 2012 census:

- Albarkaram 17,619
- Damagaram Takaya 61,580
- Guidimouni 69,587
- Mazamni 22,183
- Moa 26,632
- Wame 43,568
