= Dogondoutchi Department =

Coordinates: 13°38′21″N 4°01′43″E

Dogondoutchi
- Department
- Dogondoutchi Department location in the region (old borders)
- Country: Niger
- Region: Dosso Region

Area
  - Total: 3,168 sq mi (8,206 km^{2})

Population (2012 census)
  - Total: 372,473
  - Density: 117.6/sq mi (45.39/km^{2})
- Time zone: UTC+1 (GMT 1)

Dogondoutchi is a department of the Dosso Region in Niger. Its capital lies at the city of Dogondoutchi. As of 2012, the department had a total population of 372,473 people.

== Communes ==
- Dan-Kassari
- Dogondoutchi
- Dogonkiria
- Kieche
- Matankari
- Soucoucoutane
