= Bermo Department =

Bermo
- Department
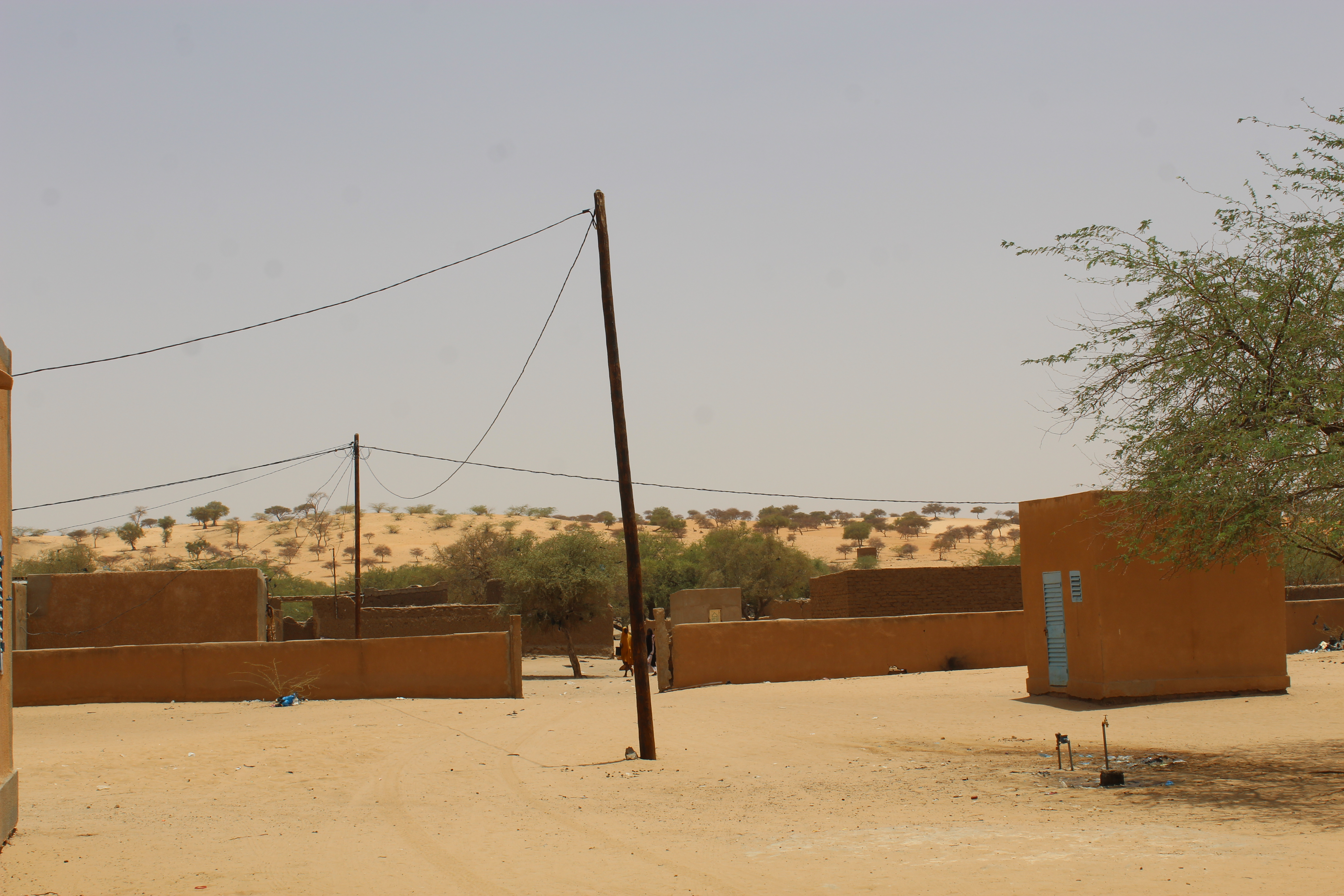
- Landscape
- Interactive map of Bermo
- Country: Niger
- Region: Maradi Region

Area
  - Total: 2,191 sq mi (5,675 km^{2})

Population (2012)
  - Total: 52,274
  - Density: 23.86/sq mi (9.211/km^{2})
- Time zone: UTC+1 (GMT 1)

Bermo is a department of the Maradi Region in Niger. The department is located in the centre of the country. Its administrative seat is the city of Bermo. As of 2012, the department had a total population of 52,274 people.

== History ==
The department goes back to the administrative post (poste administratif) of Bermo, which was established in 1988. In 2011, the administrative post was separated from the department of Dakoro and elevated to the department of Bermo.

== Municipalities ==
Bermo Department is divided into two municipalities, listed with population as of 2012 census:

- Bermo (30,761)
- Gababedji (21,513)
