= N'Guelbély =

- Commune and village
- Location in Niger
- Coordinates: 13°38′53″N 11°44′26″E
- Country: Niger
- Region: Diffa
- Department: Maïné-Soroa

Area
  - Total: 1,337 sq mi (3,464 km^{2})

Population (2012)
  - Total: 21,976
  - Density: 16.43/sq mi (6.344/km^{2})
- Time zone: UTC+1 (WAT)

N'Guelbély (also: Nguel Bely, N'Guelbeyli, N'Guel Beyli) is a village and rural commune in Niger.

== Geography ==
N'Guelbély lies in the Sahel. The neighboring communes are Tesker to the north, N'Gourti to the northeast, Foulatari to the east, south and Maïné-Soroa Goudoumaria are in the southwest. The commune is divided into the administrative village of N'Guelbély, five camps and two water sources. The seat of the community is the administrative village of N'Guelbély.

== History ==
The rural community of N'Guelbély emerged as an administrative unit in 2002 as part of a nationwide administrative reform, dividing the territory of the canton of Maïné-Soroa, creating the communities of Foulatari, Maïné-Soroa and N'Guelbély.

In the 2001 census, N'Guelbély had 1,000 inhabitants. For the year 2012, 21,976 inhabitants were reported.

== Economy and Infrastructure ==
The community is located in the transition zone to the south of the Agropastoralismus zone of pure pasture economy in the north.
