= Mokko =

Mokko may refer to:

- Mokko, Niger, a village and rural commune in Niger
- a type of fundoshi, a Japanese undergarment
- stage name of Maureen Koech, Kenyan actress, songwriter and singer
- Mount Mokko, near Mount Hachimantai, Japan

== See also ==
- MokkoStudio, a Canadian visual effects and animation firm
- Tendo Mokko, a Japanese furniture maker
