= Guidan Roumdji Department =

Coordinates: 13°39′27″N 6°41′45″E

Guidan Roumdji
- Department
- Guidan Roumdji Department location in the region
- Country: Niger
- Region: Maradi Region

Area
  - Total: 1,801 sq mi (4,664 km^{2})

Population (2012 census)
  - Total: 523,717
  - Density: 290.8/sq mi (112.3/km^{2})
- Time zone: UTC+1 (GMT 1)

Groumdji is a department of the Maradi Region of Niger. Its capital lies at the city of Guidan Roumdji. As of 2012, the department had a total population of 523,717 people.

== Communes ==
- Chadakori
- Guidanroumdji
- Guidan Sori
- Sae Saboua
- Tibiri
