= Harikanassou =

- Commune and village
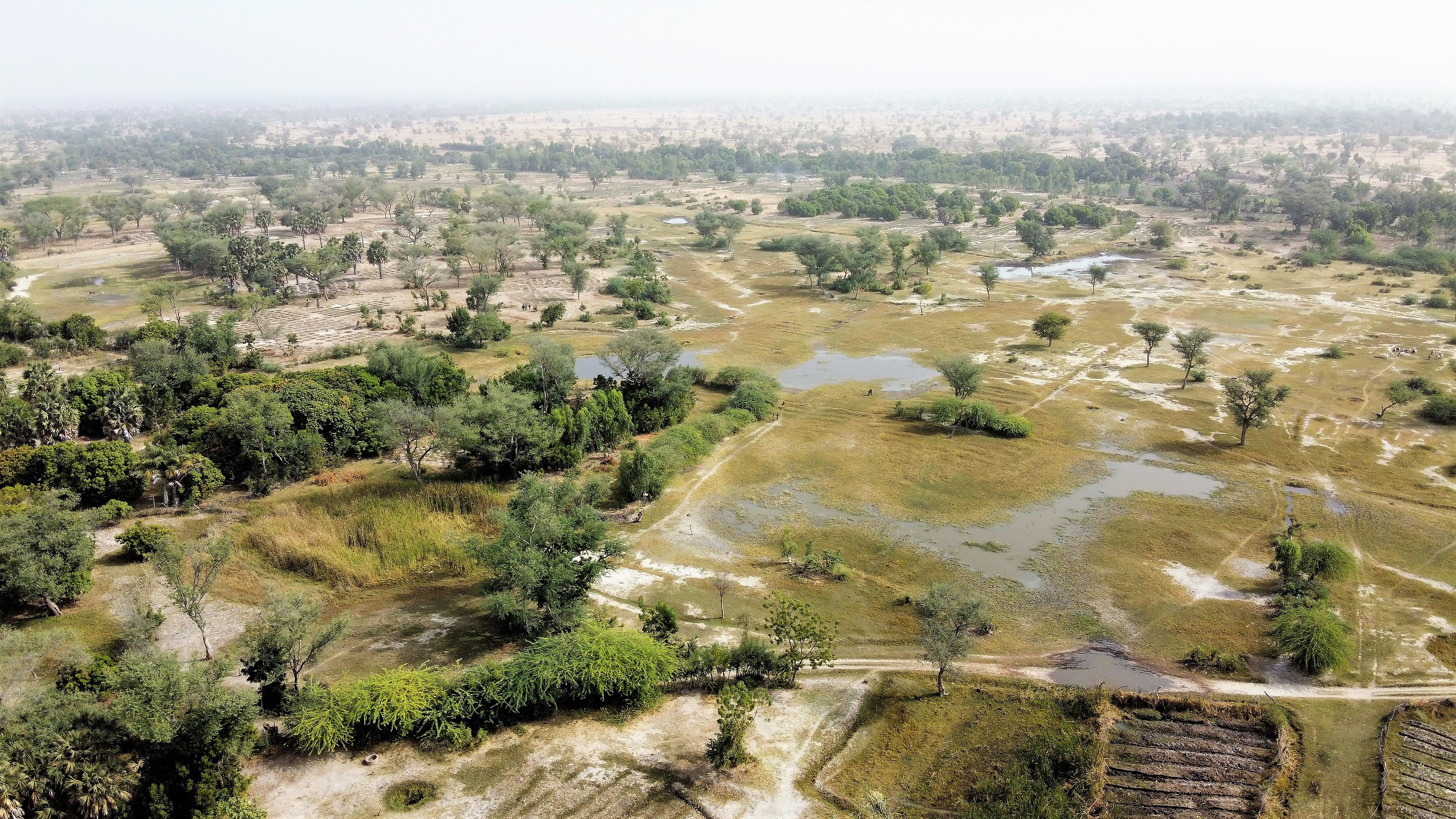
- Niabéré Bella Zarma village in Harikanassou commune

- Location in Niger
- Coordinates: 13°15′31″N 2°50′29″E
- Country: Niger
- Region: Dosso
- Department: Boboye

Population (2012)
  - Total: 23,567
- Time zone: UTC+1 (WAT)

Harikanassou is a large village and rural commune in the Boboye Department of the Dosso Region of southwest Niger, 90.7 kilometres (56.4 mi) by road southeast of the capital of Niamey. At the time of the 2012 census, the rural community had 23,567 residents living in 3,340 households. Onion cultivation is a chief source of income for many, along with the cultivation of lettuce, beans, squashes, and tomatoes.

== History and demographics ==
The rural community of Harikanassou emerged as an administrative unit in 2002 as part of a nationwide administrative reform from the western part of the canton of Harikanassou/Kiota. In the 2012 census, the rural community had 23,567 residents living in 3,340 households. Ethnically, the inhabitants mainly belong to the Zarma and Fula (Fulbe) ethnic groups.

== Geography ==
The commune lies in the Dallol Bosso valley in southwest Niger in the Dosso Region, near the border with the Tillabéri Region, 90.7 kilometres (56.4 mi) by road southeast of the capital of Niamey. It borders the communes of N'Gonga to the south, Kouré in the southwest, Koygolo in the north, Diantchandou in the northwest and Kiota in the east. The commune contains 32 administrative villages, 22 hamlets and 7 camps.

During the dry season, the last wild population of West African giraffes migrate from Kouré to the Harikanassou area.

== Politics ==
The municipal council (conseil municipal) has 11 elected members. Following the 2020 local elections, the seats in the municipal council are distributed as follows: 6 PNDS-Tarayya, 2 RNDP-Aneima Banizoumbou, 1 ANDP-Zaman Lahiya, 1 MNSD-Nassara and 1 PJP-Génération Doubara. Each of the 32 villages in the municipality, including the main town, is headed by a traditional mayor (chef traditionnel).

== Economy and landmarks ==
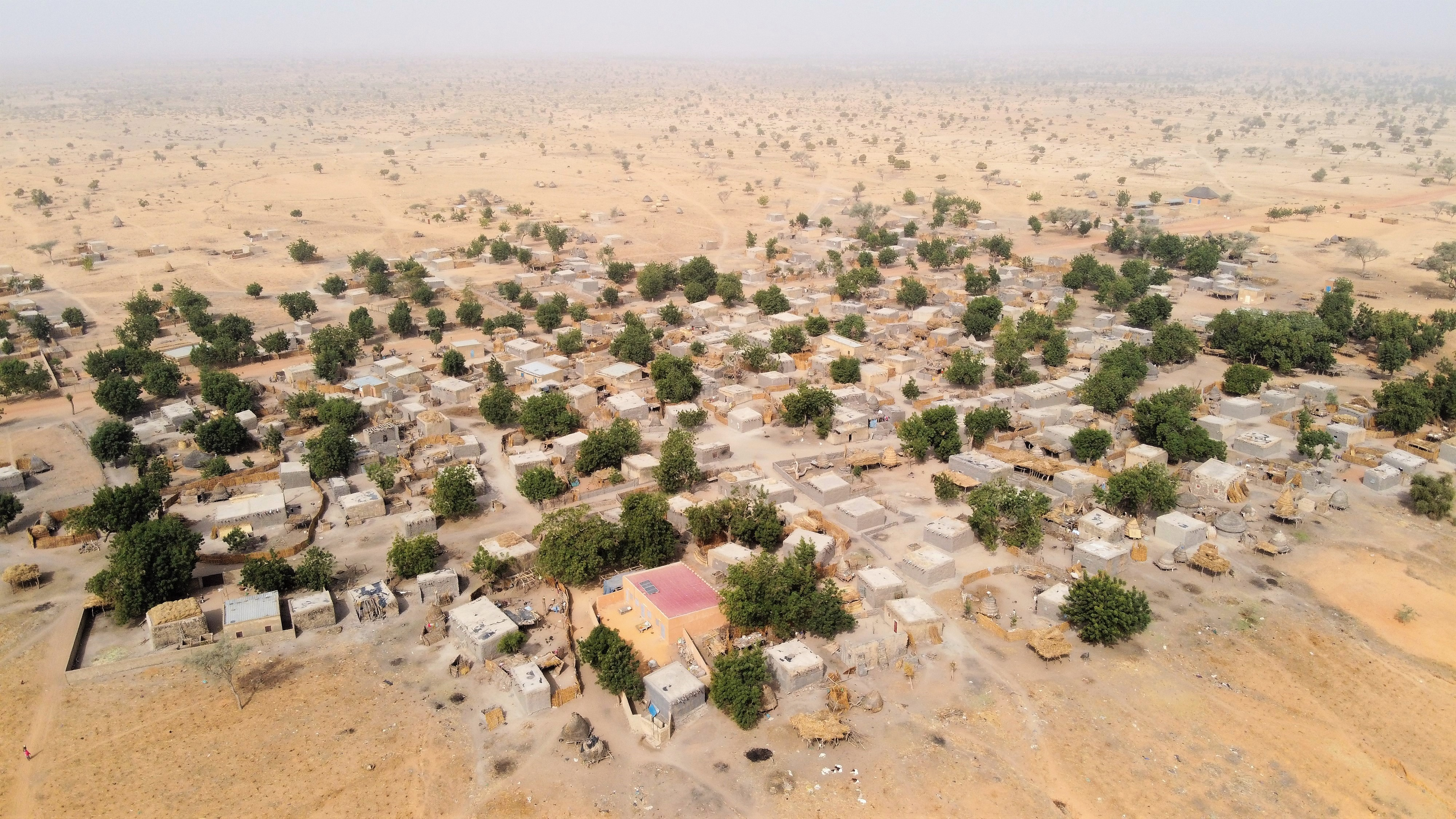
Niabéré Bella village, Harikanassou

Due to its location in the valley of the Dallol Bosso, the water table is only a few meters below the surface of the earth, which allows the creation of irrigated vegetable gardens. Onion cultivation is a chief source of income for many in the commune, and lettuce, beans, squashes, and tomatoes are also grown. Many of the male residents go to the city or to neighboring Nigeria to find work during the dry season. A market is held in the main town. The state supply center for agricultural resources and materials (CAIMA) maintains a point of sale in the main town.

Health Centers of the Center de Santé Intégré (CSI) exist in the main town and in the settlement of Kouringuel Mayaki. The CEG Harikanassou is a general secondary school belonging to the Collège d'Enseignement Général (CEG). There is a mosque in the main settlement of Harikanassou.

== Notable people ==
- Amadou Seyni Maïga (born 1942), officer, politician and diplomat, traditional ruler of Kiota and Harikanassou
