= Golle =

Golle may refer to:

- Gölle, a village in Somogy county, Hungary
- Golle, Niger, a village and rural commune in Niger
