= Gangara, Tanout =

Coordinates: 14°36′48″N 8°30′10″E

- Commune and village
- Interactive map of Gangara, Tanout
- Country: Niger

Area
  - Total: 1,651 sq mi (4,277 km^{2})

Population (2012 census)
  - Total: 112,967
  - Density: 68.41/sq mi (26.41/km^{2})
- Time zone: UTC+1 (WAT)

Gangara, Tanout is a village and rural commune in Niger. As of 2012, it had a population of 112,967.
