= Wame =

Wame may refer to:

== People ==
- Wame Valentine, actor
- Wame Lewaravu (born 1983), Fijian rugby union player

== Places ==
- Wame, Niger
- Wame river, France

== Other ==
- WAME, a radio station licensed to serve Statesville, North Carolina, United States
- WGFY, a radio station licensed to serve Charlotte, North Carolina, United States, which held the call sign WAME from 1969 to 1990
- WSUA, a radio station licensed to serve Miami, Florida, United States, which held the call sign WAME from 1958 to 1969
