= Falmey Department =

Falmey
- Department
- Interactive map of Falmey
- Country: Niger
- Region: Dosso Region

Area
  - Total: 595 sq mi (1,542 km^{2})

Population (2012)
  - Total: 103,271
  - Density: 173.5/sq mi (66.97/km^{2})
- Time zone: UTC+1 (GMT 1)

Falmey is a department of the Dosso Region in Niger. The department is located in the south-west of the country and borders Benin. Its administrative seat is the city of Falmey. As of 2012, the department had a total population of 103,271 people.

== History ==
The department goes back to the administrative post (poste administratif) of Falmey, which was established in 1964. In 2011, the administrative post was separated from the department of Boboye and elevated to the department of Falmey.

== Municipalities ==
Falmey Department is divided into two municipalities, listed with population as of 2012 census:

- Falmey (75,115)
- Guilladje (28,156)
