= Doumega =

Coordinates: 12°58′N 3°59′E

Doumega Douméga
- Commune and village
- Interactive map of Doumega
- Country: Niger
- Region: Dosso
- Department: Dogondoutchi

Population (2010)
  - Total: 35,469
- Time zone: UTC+1 (WAT)

Doumega is a village and rural commune in Niger.
