= Mahamane Dan Dobi =

Nigerien Politician

- Born: 1923; Guéchémé, Niger
- Died: May 13, 1981; Niamey, Niger
- Education: École normale William-Ponty (1938–1942)
- Occupations: Politician, Playwright
- Known for: Founding member of the Nigerien Progressive Party, Ministerial roles in post-independence Niger, Dramatic works
- Notable work: The Adventure of a Goat (1955) * The Legend of Kabrin Kabra (1957) * The Guests at the Welcome Bar * Maïmouna

Chief of Takassaba
- In office 1960–1974

Minister of Justice
- In office 1965–1970

Minister of Health
- In office 1970–1970

Minister of Public Works, Mines, and Construction
- In office 1970–1972

Minister of Rural Economy
- In office 1972–1974

Personal details
- Party: Nigerien Progressive Party – African Democratic Rally

Mahamane Dan Dobi, born in 1923 in Guéchémé and died on May 13, 1981 in Niamey, was a Nigerien politician. He was also a playwright.

== Educational background ==
Mahamane Dan Dobi received his education in Guéchémé, Birni N'Konni, Maradi, and Niamey. He later attended the École normale William-Ponty from 1938 to 1942. After completing his studies, he worked in the colonial administration in Niamey until 1945, when he was transferred to Téra.

Mahamane Dan Dobi was one of the founding members of the Nigerien Progressive Party. His outspoken anti-colonial stance drew suspicion from the local French colonial authorities, prompting him to live in Guinea from 1948 to 1954. Upon his return to Niamey, he led the Amicale de Niamey theatre company, for which he wrote several plays.

== Political career ==
Two years after returning to Niger, Mahamane Dan Dobi became Deputy Secretary General of the Nigerien Progressive Party. In 1957, he was elected to the Niger Territorial Assembly as a representative for the Dogondoutchi district. In 1958, he was elected to the Nigerien Parliament, and in 1959, he was appointed as a senator to the French Council of the Republic.

Shortly before Niger’s independence, in July 1960, he became the traditional chief of Takassaba, a position he held until 1974 alongside his political career. On November 23, 1965, his party colleague Hamani Diori appointed him Minister of Justice. He briefly served as Minister of Health starting January 15, 1970, and later, on November 22, 1970, became Minister of Public Works, Mines, and Construction. His final ministerial role began on August 17, 1972, as Minister of Rural Economy.

On April 15, 1974, Seyni Kountché overthrew Hamani Diori in a coup and had Mahamane Dan Dobi, along with most of his ministerial colleagues, arrested and imprisoned at the military camp in Agadez. Former minister Léopold Kaziendé, who enjoyed significantly better detention conditions than Mahamane Dan Dobi, who had once been Kountché’s teacher, was allowed in 1976 to choose a fellow detainee. He chose Mahamane Dan Dobi.

On April 15, 1978, both were released. In October 1980, Mahamane Dan Dobi was arrested again and detained in Dosso prison for reasons that remain unclear. He died about six months later in a hospital in Niamey.

== Work as a playwright ==
- The Adventure of a Goat (1955)
- The Legend of Kabrin Kabra (1957)
- The Guests at the Welcome Bar
- Maïmouna
