= Malbaza Department =

Malbaza
- Department
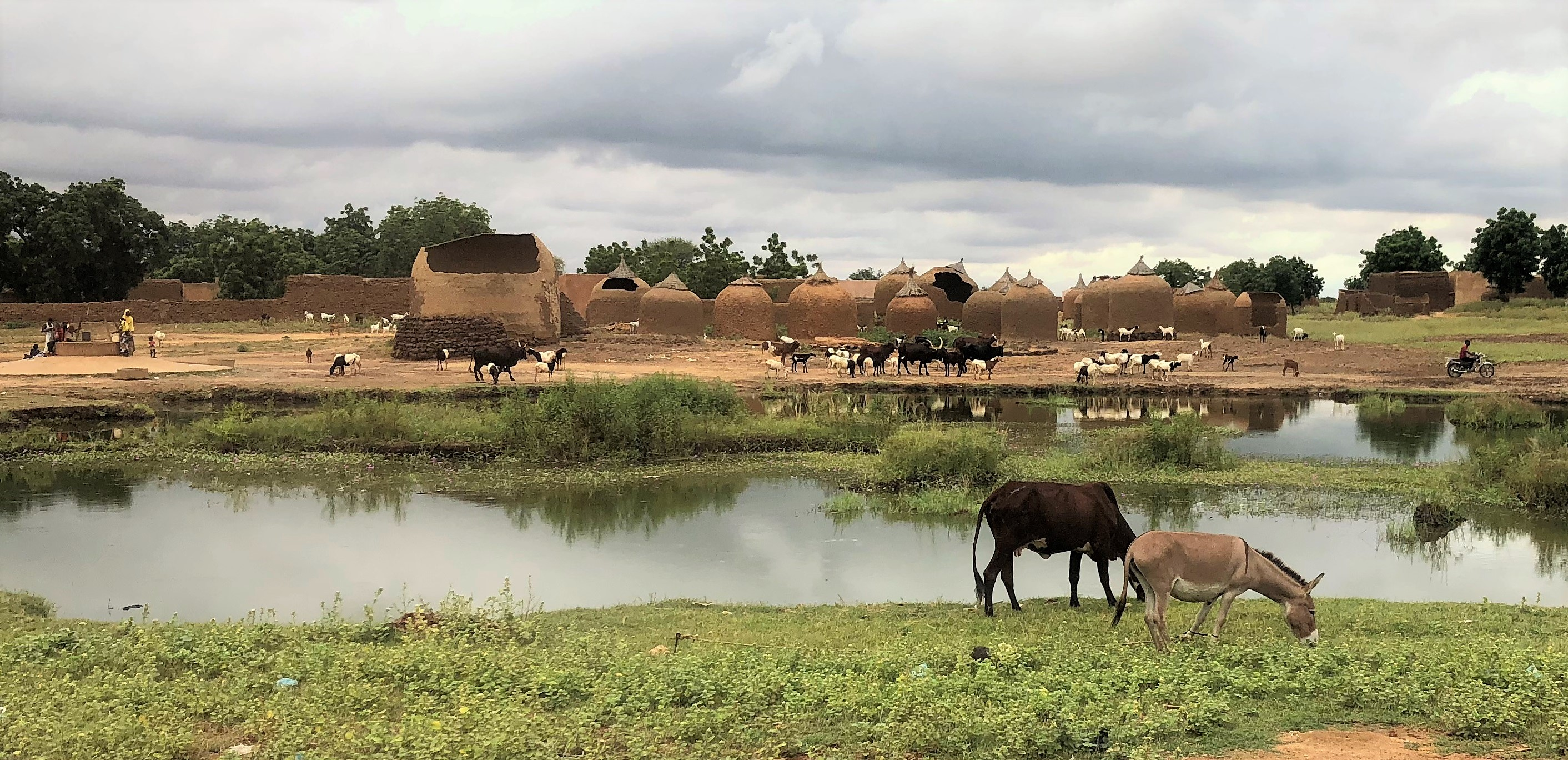
- Village in Malbaza
- Interactive map of Malbaza
- Country: Niger
- Region: Tahoua Region

Area
  - Total: 562 sq mi (1,456 km^{2})

Population (2012)
  - Total: 232,407
  - Density: 413.4/sq mi (159.6/km^{2})
- Time zone: UTC+1 (GMT 1)

Malbaza is a department of the Tahoua Region in Niger. The department is located in the south of the country and borders Nigeria. It consists of the rural communities of Doguérawa and Malbaza. The eponymous capital of the department is Malbaza. As of 2012, the department had a total population of 246,818 people.

== History ==
The department goes back to the administrative post (poste administratif) of Doguérawa, which was established in 1964 and transferred to Malbaza in 1973. In 2011, the administrative post was separated from the department of Birni-N'Konni and elevated to the department of Malbaza.

== Municipalities ==
Malbaza Department is divided into two municipalities, listed with population as of 2012 census:

- Doguerawa 117,975
- Malbaza 114,432
