= Stade de Malbaza =

Football stadium in Malbaza, Niger

Stade de Malbaza is a soccer stadium in Malbaza, Niger. It can hold crowds of up to 2,000, both to watch FC Malbaza and regional tournaments such as the Tournoi de Grandes Vacances that showcases regional teams.
