= Azarori =

Coordinates: 14°10′43″N 5°53′21″E

- Commune and village
- Interactive map of Azarori
- Country: Niger

Area
  - Total: 78.5 sq mi (203.4 km^{2})
- Elevation: 1,155 ft (352 m)

Population (2012)
  - Total: 18,582
  - Density: 236.6/sq mi (91.36/km^{2})
- Time zone: UTC+1 (WAT)

Azarori is a village and rural commune in Niger.

== Geography ==
Azarori lies in the Sahel. The neighboring municipalities are Tama in the northwest, Bouza in the northeast, Madaoua in the southeast and Galma Koudawatche in the southwest. The territory is divided into seven administrative villages, nine traditional villages and 21 hamlets. The main town of the rural community is the administrative village Azarori (also: Azérori sédentaire).

== Population ==
At the 2001 census Azarori had 13,873 inhabitants. In the 2012 census, the population was 18,582. In the community members of the live Hausa subgroup Gobirawa and the Tuareg subgroup Kel Gress.

== Economy and Infrastructure ==
Azarori lies in that narrow zone along the border with Nigeria, of Tounounga in the west to Malawa ranges in the east and in the irrigation field economy operated. There are millet, sorghum, cowpeas grown, peanuts, onions and lettuce. Another important economic activity is livestock farming. In the municipal area also plaster and lime are mined. Due to its proximity to the main city of Madaoua, there are only a few health and education facilities in Azarori. In education, there are eleven primary schools and a secondary school. Madaoua Azarori is connected via the National Road 16, which in the other direction to the regional capital Tahoua leads.
