= Malbaza FC =

Nigerien football club

- Stadium: Stade de Malbaza
- Capacity: 2,000
- League: Super Ligue

Malbaza FC is a Nigerien soccer team based in Malbaza, Niger, approximately six hours east of the capital Niamey. Financed by the local concrete plant, the team played in the Super Ligue. Players are drawn from the Tahoua region. They play in Stade de Malbaza.

They played in the Super Ligue (then called the Championnat national de première division) from 2006 to 2011. They came in third place in the 2006–07 season of the Premier League before encountering a series of rough seasons.

In 2008 and 2009, Malbaza survived the relegation playoff to remain in the top division. They finished middle of the table in the 2010 season, but in the 2010–11 season, they played only half the season before forfeiting the rest of their games and being removed from the league.
