= Baoudetta =

Coordinates: 14°37′20″N 8°06′43″E

- Commune and village
- Interactive map of Baoudetta
- Country: Niger
- Region: Maradi
- Department: Tessaoua
- Elevation: 1,322 ft (403 m)

Population (2010)
  - Total: 11,375
- Time zone: UTC+1 (WAT)

Baoudetta is a village and rural commune in Niger.
