= Sokorbe =

Coordinates: 13°30′N 3°11′E

- Commune and village
- Interactive map of Sokorbe
- Country: Niger

Area
  - Total: 155.9 sq mi (403.8 km^{2})

Population (2012 census)
  - Total: 35,579
  - Density: 228.2/sq mi (88.11/km^{2})
- Time zone: UTC+1 (WAT)

Sokorbe is a village and rural commune in Niger. As of 2012, it had a population of 35,579.
