= Karguibangou =

Coordinates: 12°56′55″N 3°30′20″E

Kargiubangou
- Commune and village
- Interactive map of Kargiubangou
- Country: Niger
- Time zone: UTC+1 (WAT)

Kargiubangou is a village and rural commune in Niger.
