= Droum =

Coordinates: 13°34′N 8°53′E

- Commune and village
- Interactive map of Droum
- Country: Niger

Area
  - Total: 289.2 sq mi (749.0 km^{2})

Population (2012 census)
  - Total: 102,306
  - Density: 353.8/sq mi (136.6/km^{2})
- Time zone: UTC+1 (WAT)

Droum is a village and rural commune in Niger. As of 2012, it had a population of 102,306.
