= Maradi I =

- Commune
- Interactive map of Maradi I
- Country: Niger

Area
  - Total: 3.93 sq mi (10.19 km^{2})

Population (2012 census)
  - Total: 114,307
  - Density: 29,050/sq mi (11,220/km^{2})
- Time zone: UTC+1 (WAT)

Maradi I is an urban commune in Niger. It is a commune of the city of Maradi. As of 2012, it had a population of 114,307.
