= Koona =

Coordinates: 13°33′N 8°03′E

- Commune and village
- Interactive map of Koona
- Country: Niger
- Time zone: UTC+1 (WAT)

Koona is a village and rural commune in Niger.

Koona is also a common misspelling and mispronunciation of the Idaho city "Kuna"
