= Hawandawaki =

Coordinates: 13°20′58″N 8°14′20″E

- Commune and village
- Interactive map of Hawandawaki
- Country: Niger
- Time zone: UTC+1 (WAT)

Hawandawaki is a village and rural commune in Niger.
