= Tchadoua =

Coordinates: 13°33′N 7°27′E

- Commune and village
- Interactive map of Tchadoua
- Country: Niger

Area
  - Total: 222.4 sq mi (576.0 km^{2})

Population (2012 census)
  - Total: 93,208
  - Density: 419.1/sq mi (161.8/km^{2})
- Time zone: UTC+1 (WAT)

Tchadoua is a village and rural commune in Niger. As of 2012, it had a population of 93,208.
