= Bader Goula =

Coordinates: 14°39′23″N 7°14′04″E

- Commune and village
- Interactive map of Bader Goula
- Country: Niger
- Region: Maradi
- Department: Dakoro

Area
  - Total: 670 sq mi (1,730 km^{2})
- Elevation: 1,306 ft (398 m)

Population (2012 census)
  - Total: 68,203
  - Density: 102/sq mi (39.4/km^{2})
- Time zone: UTC+1 (WAT)

Bader Goula is a village and rural commune in Niger. As of 2012, it had a population of 68,203.
