= Sambera =

Coordinates: 12°24′N 3°03′E

- Commune and village
- Interactive map of Sambera
- Country: Niger

Area
  - Total: 412 sq mi (1,067 km^{2})

Population (2012 census)
  - Total: 50,820
  - Density: 123.4/sq mi (47.63/km^{2})
- Time zone: UTC+1 (WAT)

Sambera is a village and rural commune in Niger. As of 2012, it had a population of 50,820.
