= Falwel =

Coordinates: 13°31′13″N 3°35′45″E

- Commune and village
- Interactive map of Falwel
- Country: Niger

Area
  - Total: 441 sq mi (1,143 km^{2})

Population (2012 census)
  - Total: 57,564
  - Density: 130.4/sq mi (50.36/km^{2})
- Time zone: UTC+1 (WAT)

Falwel is a village and rural commune in Niger. As of 2012, it had a population of 57,564.
