= Takanamat =

- Commune and village
- Location in Niger
- Coordinates: 15°08′N 4°47′E
- Country: Niger

Area
  - Total: 680 sq mi (1,761 km^{2})

Population (2012 census)
  - Total: 44,049
  - Density: 64.79/sq mi (25.01/km^{2})
- Time zone: UTC+1 (WAT)

Takanamat is a village and rural commune in Niger. As of 2012, it had a population of 61,779.
