= Farey, Niger =

Coordinates: 12°32′N 3°19′E

- Commune and village
- Interactive map of Farey, Niger
- Country: Niger

Area
  - Total: 432 sq mi (1,119 km^{2})

Population (2012 census)
  - Total: 40,302
  - Density: 93.28/sq mi (36.02/km^{2})
- Time zone: UTC+1 (WAT)

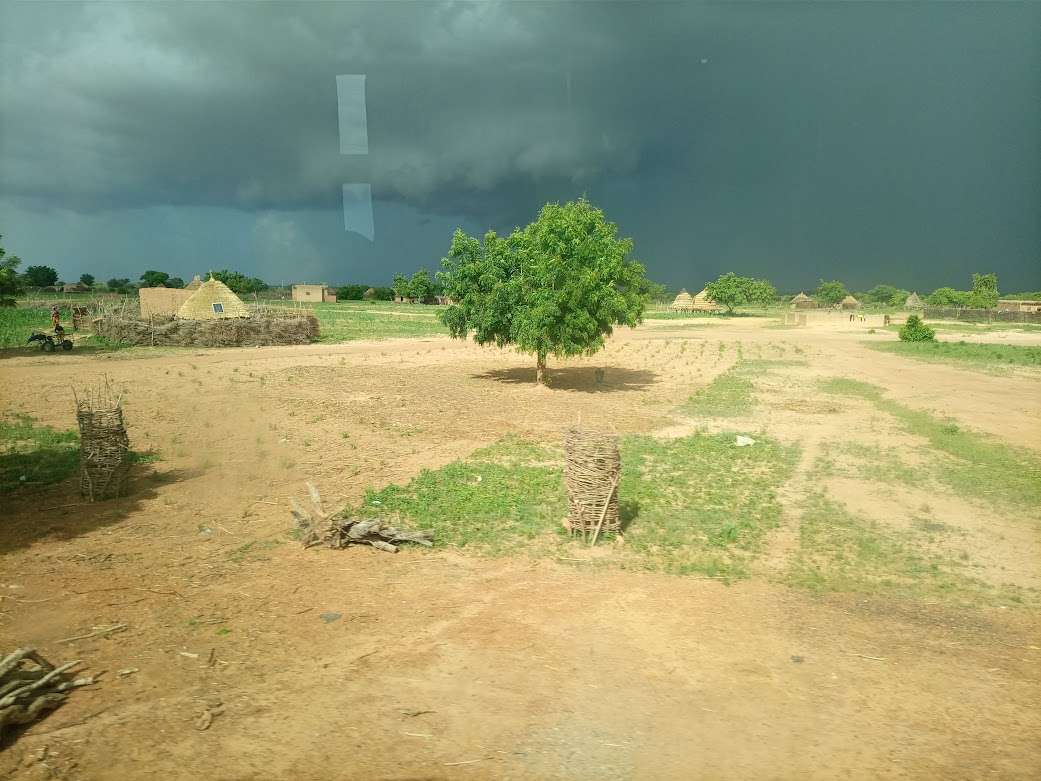
The village Talibi Birdji in the commune of Farrey.

Farey, Niger is a village and rural commune in Niger. As of 2012, it had a population of 40,302.
