= Babankatami =

Coordinates: 14°31′29″N 6°15′26″E

- Commune and village
- Interactive map of Babankatami
- Country: Niger

Area
  - Total: 329.0 sq mi (852.1 km^{2})
- Elevation: 1,120 ft (340 m)

Population (2012 census)
  - Total: 65,906
  - Density: 200.3/sq mi (77.35/km^{2})
- Time zone: UTC+1 (WAT)

Babankatami is a village and rural commune in Niger. As of 2012, it had a population of 65,906.
