= Tamaya, Niger =

Rural commune and village in Niger

Coordinates: 15°49′12″N 6°45′44″E

- Commune and village
- Interactive map of Tamaya, Niger
- Country: Niger

Area
  - Total: 881 sq mi (2,282 km^{2})

Population (2012 census)
  - Total: 30,956
  - Density: 35.13/sq mi (13.57/km^{2})
- Time zone: UTC+1 (WAT)

Tamaya, Niger is a village and rural commune in Niger.

In 2012, it had a population of 30,956.
