= Kablewa =

Coordinates: 13°44′16″N 12°55′50″E

- Commune and village
- Interactive map of Kablewa
- Country: Niger

Area
  - Total: 2,567 sq mi (6,648 km^{2})

Population (2012 census)
  - Total: 26,176
  - Density: 10.20/sq mi (3.937/km^{2})
- Time zone: UTC+1 (WAT)

Kablewa is a village and rural commune in Niger.

In 2012 it had a population of 26,176.
