= Maradi III =

- Commune
- Interactive map of Maradi III
- Country: Niger

Area
  - Total: 20.44 sq mi (52.93 km^{2})

Population (2012 census)
  - Total: 86,214
  - Density: 4,219/sq mi (1,629/km^{2})
- Time zone: UTC+1 (WAT)

Maradi III is an urban commune in Niger. It is a commune of the city of Maradi. As of 2012, it had a population of 86,214.
