= Deoule =

Coordinates: 14°31′N 5°59′E

- Commune and village
- Interactive map of Deoule
- Country: Niger
- Time zone: UTC+1 (WAT)

Deoule is a village and rural commune in Niger.
