= Birni N'Gaouré =

Town in Niger

- Commune and town
- Location within Niger
- Coordinates: 13°5′16″N 2°55′1″E
- Country: Niger
- Dosso: Region
- Boboye: Department
- Birni N'Gaouré: Commune
- Elevation: 175 m (574 ft)

Population (2011)
  - Total: 54,622
- Time zone: UTC+1

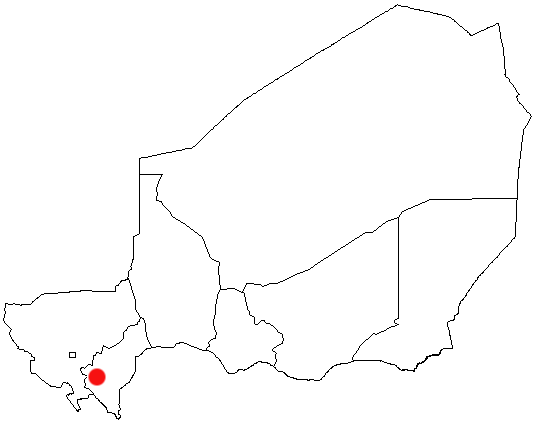
Location of Birni N'Gaouré, Map of Regions of Niger in Niger

Birni N'Gaouré (or Birnin Gaouré) is a town located in the Dosso Region in southwest Niger. A town of over ten thousand, it is the departmental seat of Boboye Department, and is the main town of the fertile farming region in which it is located. "Birni", in the name of the town, derives from the Hausa language word for a walled city.

The town has a station on the Niamey - Dosso railway line. Built between 2014 and 2016 the objective of this line was to connect Niger to the rail network in Benin and thus to the coast. But the connection to Benin never materialized. The rail now ends in Dosso and no train has ever stopped at the Birni N'Gaouré station.
