= Wacha, Niger =

Coordinates: 13°22′N 9°18′E

Wacha
- Commune and village
- Interactive map of Wacha
- Country: Niger
- Region: Zinder
- Department: Magaria

Area
  - Total: 383.4 sq mi (993.0 km^{2})

Population (2012 census)
  - Total: 93,492
  - Density: 243.9/sq mi (94.15/km^{2})
- Time zone: UTC+1 (WAT)

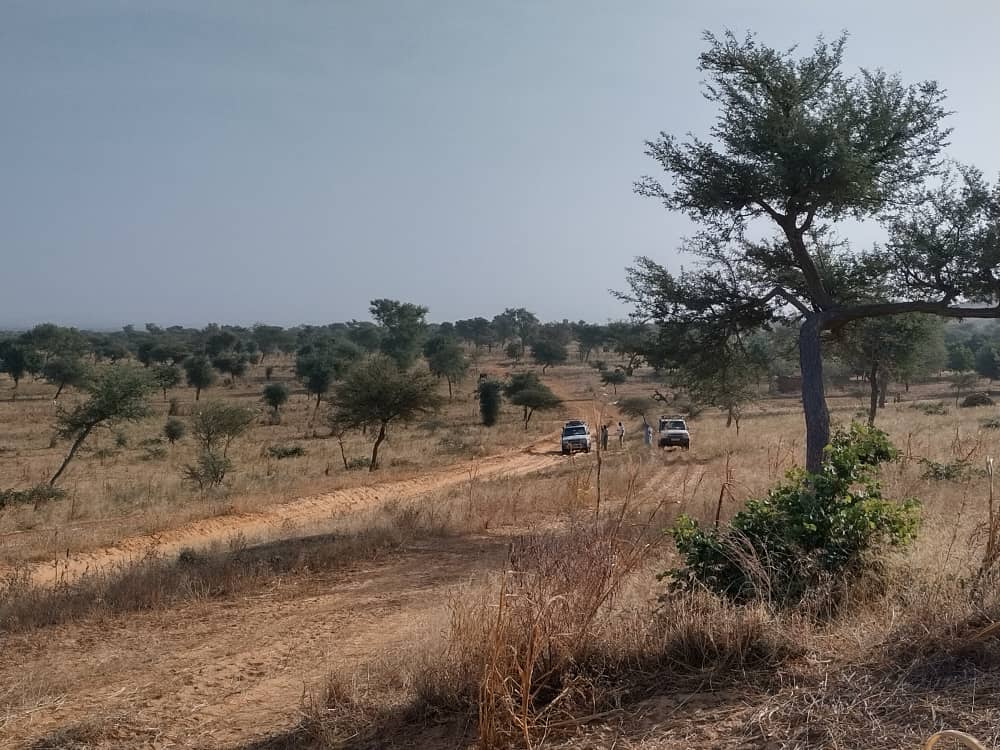
Wacha

Wacha is a village and rural commune in Niger.
