= Bangui, Niger =

Coordinates: 13°40′N 6°11′E

- Commune and village
- Interactive map of Bangui, Niger
- Country: Niger
- Region: Tahoua
- Department: Madaoua

Area
  - Total: 495 sq mi (1,283 km^{2})
- Elevation: 955 ft (291 m)

Population (2012)
  - Total: 140,446
  - Density: 283.5/sq mi (109.5/km^{2})
- Time zone: UTC+1 (WAT)

Bangui, Niger is a village and rural commune in Niger. As of 2012, it had a population of 140,446.
