= Maijirgiu =

Coordinates: 13°44′19″N 8°08′06″E

- Commune and village
- Interactive map of Maijirgiu
- Country: Niger

Area
  - Total: 294.6 sq mi (763.0 km^{2})

Population (2012 census)
  - Total: 70,655
  - Density: 239.8/sq mi (92.60/km^{2})
- Time zone: UTC+1 (WAT)

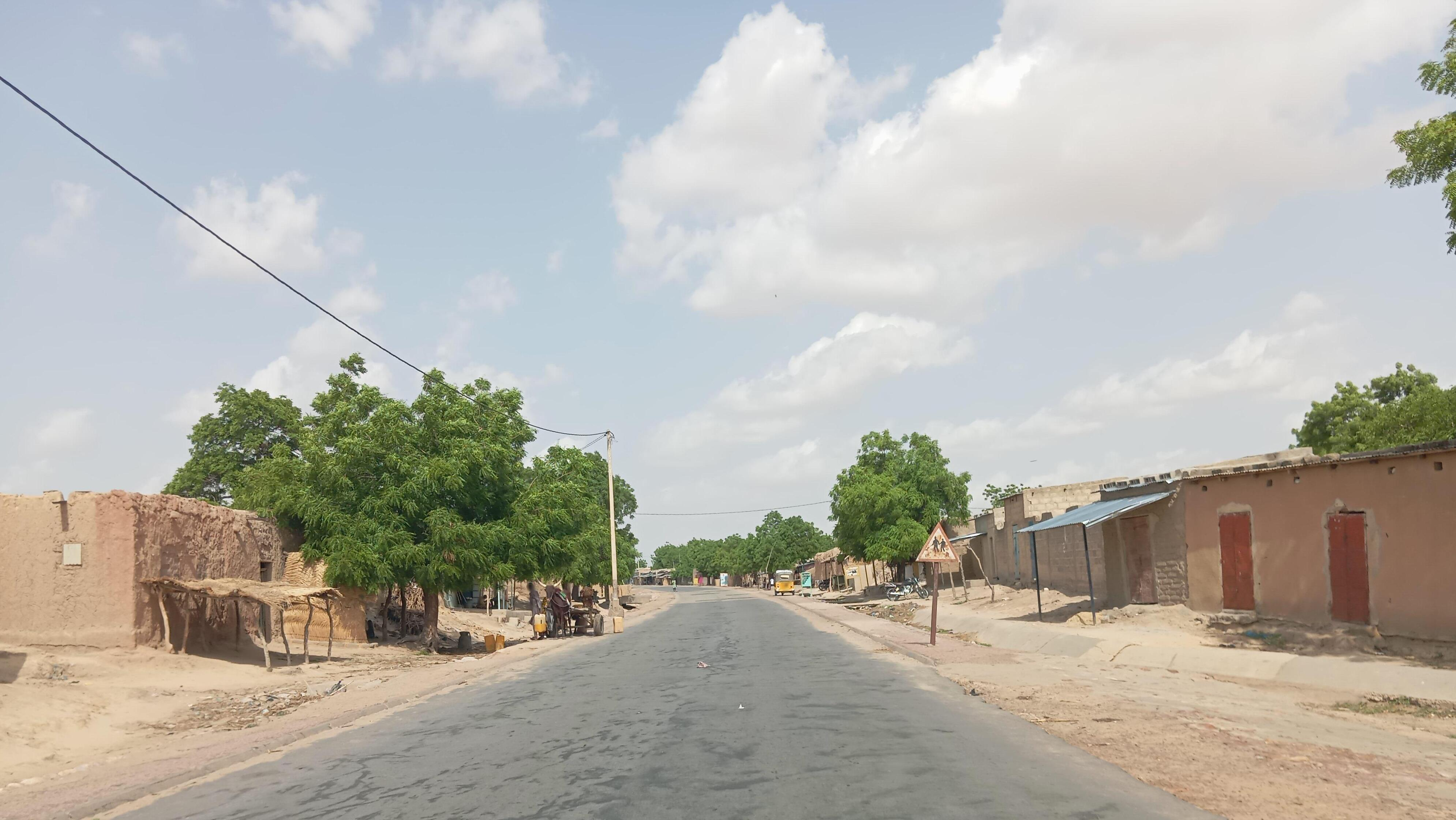
A road in Maïjirgui

Maijirgiu is a village and rural commune in Niger. As of 2012, it had a population of 70,655.
