= Tessaoua Department =

Tessaoua
- Department
- Tessaoua Department location in the region

- Location within Niger Location within Africa
- Coordinates: 13°45′26″N 7°59′14″E
- Country: Niger
- Region: Maradi Region

Population
  - Total: 479,384
- Time zone: UTC+1 (GMT 1)

Tessaoua is a department of the Maradi Region in Niger. Its capital lies at the city of Tessaoua. As of 2011, the department had a total population of 479,384 people.

== Towns and villages ==
- Awandawaki
- Badéta Haousa
- Chabaré
- Dan Aro
- Dan Gado
- Dan Kori
- Dan Saga
- Dan Takyara
- Danko
- Digaba
- Diossi
- Dogon Dawa
- Dogon Tabki
- El Dania
- Gabaouri
- Guidan Agalé
- Guidan Anné
- Guidan Zougao
- Issawan
- Jikata
- Kagoum
- Kalgo
- Kinkalé Majikay
- Korgom
- Kougome
- Koumchi
- Majiniawa
- May Guézaoua
- May Jirgui
- May Sara
- Mayahi
- Ourafane
- Takaji
- Tessaoua (capital)
- Toki
- Yataoua
- Zaroumey
