= Maradi II =

- Commune
- Interactive map of Maradi II
- Country: Niger

Area
  - Total: 4.19 sq mi (10.85 km^{2})

Population (2012 census)
  - Total: 66,728
  - Density: 15,930/sq mi (6,150/km^{2})
- Time zone: UTC+1 (WAT)

Maradi II is an urban commune in Niger. It is a commune of the city of Maradi. As of 2012, it had a population of 66,728.
