= El Allassane Maireyrey =

Coordinates: 14°10′04″N 8°06′33″E

- Commune and village
- Interactive map of El Allassane Maireyrey
- Country: Niger
- Region: Maradi
- Department: Mayahi

Area
  - Total: 470 sq mi (1,220 km^{2})

Population (2012 census)
  - Total: 64,183
  - Density: 136/sq mi (52.6/km^{2})
- Time zone: UTC+1 (WAT)

El Allassane Maireyrey is a village and rural commune in Niger. As of 2012, it had a population of 64,183.
