= Allakaye =

Coordinates: 14°24′51″N 5°44′33″E

- Commune and village
- Interactive map of Allakaye
- Country: Niger
- Region: Tahoua
- Department: Bouza
- Elevation: 1,637 ft (499 m)
- Time zone: UTC+1 (WAT)

Allakaye is a village and rural commune in Niger.
