= Tirmini =

Coordinates: 13°46′N 8°48′E

- Commune and village
- Interactive map of Tirmini
- Country: Niger
- Region: Zinder
- Department: Mirriah

Area
  - Total: 715 sq mi (1,853 km^{2})

Population (2012 census)
  - Total: 116,011
  - Density: 162.2/sq mi (62.61/km^{2})
- Time zone: UTC+1 (WAT)

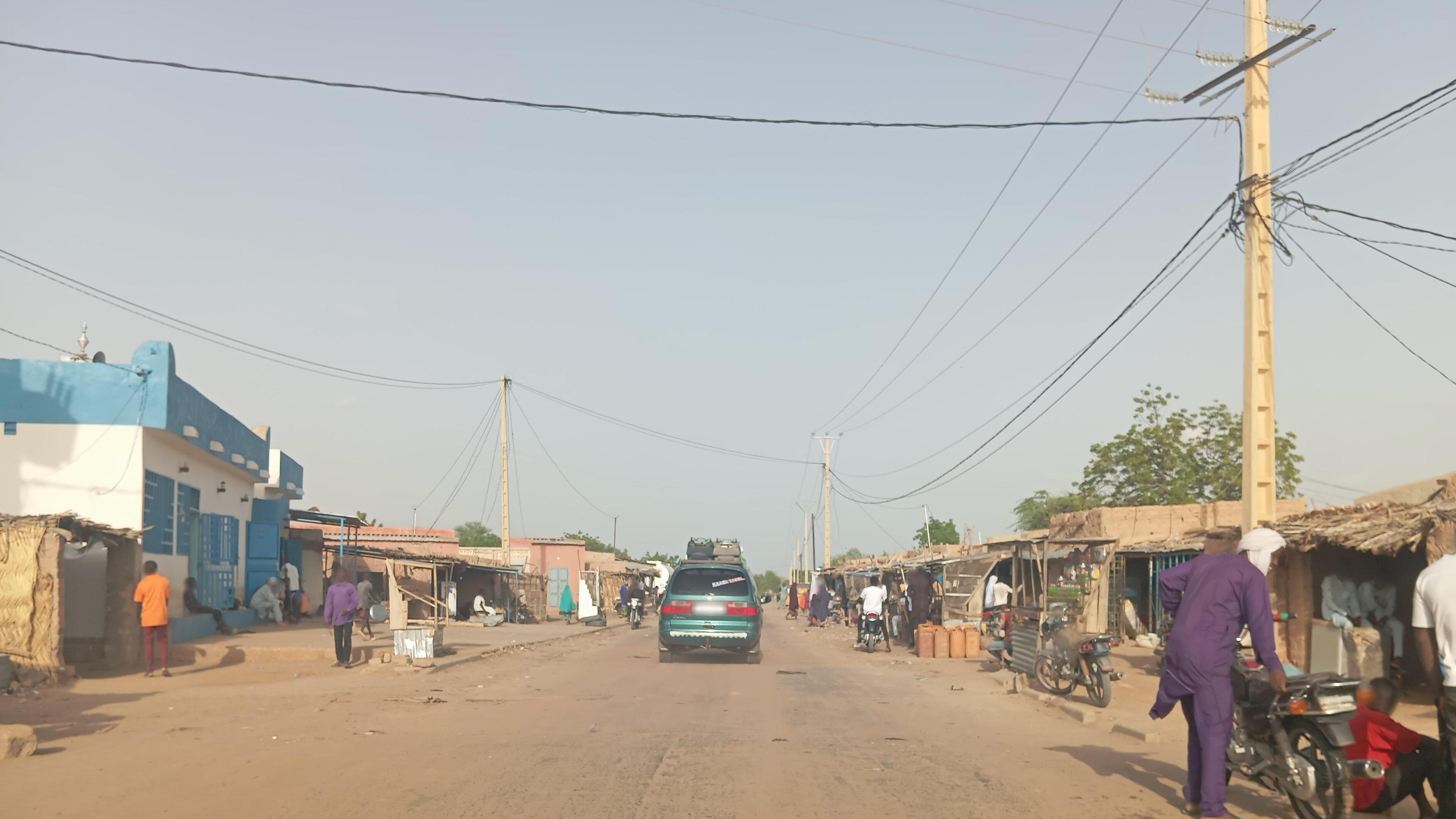
A picture taken in Tirmini

Tirmini is a village and rural commune in Niger.

In 2012 it had a population of 116,011.
