= Albarkaram =

Coordinates: 14°52′16″N 9°18′52″E

- Commune and village
- Interactive map of Albarkaram
- Country: Niger
- Region: Zinder
- Department: Damagaram Takaya

Area
  - Total: 79.3 sq mi (205.5 km^{2})
- Elevation: 1,503 ft (458 m)

Population (2012 census)
  - Total: 17,619
  - Density: 222.1/sq mi (85.74/km^{2})
- Time zone: UTC+1 (WAT)

Albarkaram is a village and rural commune in the Damagaram Takaya Department of the Zinder Region of Niger. As of 2012, it had a population of 17,619.
