= Ouro Gueladjo =

Coordinates: 13°05′44″N 2°00′40″E

- Commune and village
- Interactive map of Ouro Gueladjo
- Country: Niger

Area
  - Total: 329.7 sq mi (853.8 km^{2})

Population (2012 census)
  - Total: 27,553
  - Density: 83.58/sq mi (32.27/km^{2})
- Time zone: UTC+1 (WAT)

Ouro Gueladjo is a village and rural commune in Niger. As of 2012, it had a population of 27,553.
