= Kieche =

Coordinates: 13°29′18″N 4°00′14″E

- Commune and village
- Interactive map of Kieche
- Country: Niger

Area
  - Total: 171.3 sq mi (443.6 km^{2})

Population (2012 census)
  - Total: 48,980
  - Density: 286.0/sq mi (110.4/km^{2})
- Time zone: UTC+1 (WAT)

Kieche is a village and rural commune in Niger. As of 2012, it had a population of 48,980.
