= Bermo, Niger =

Coordinates: 14°42′N 6°43′E

- Commune and village
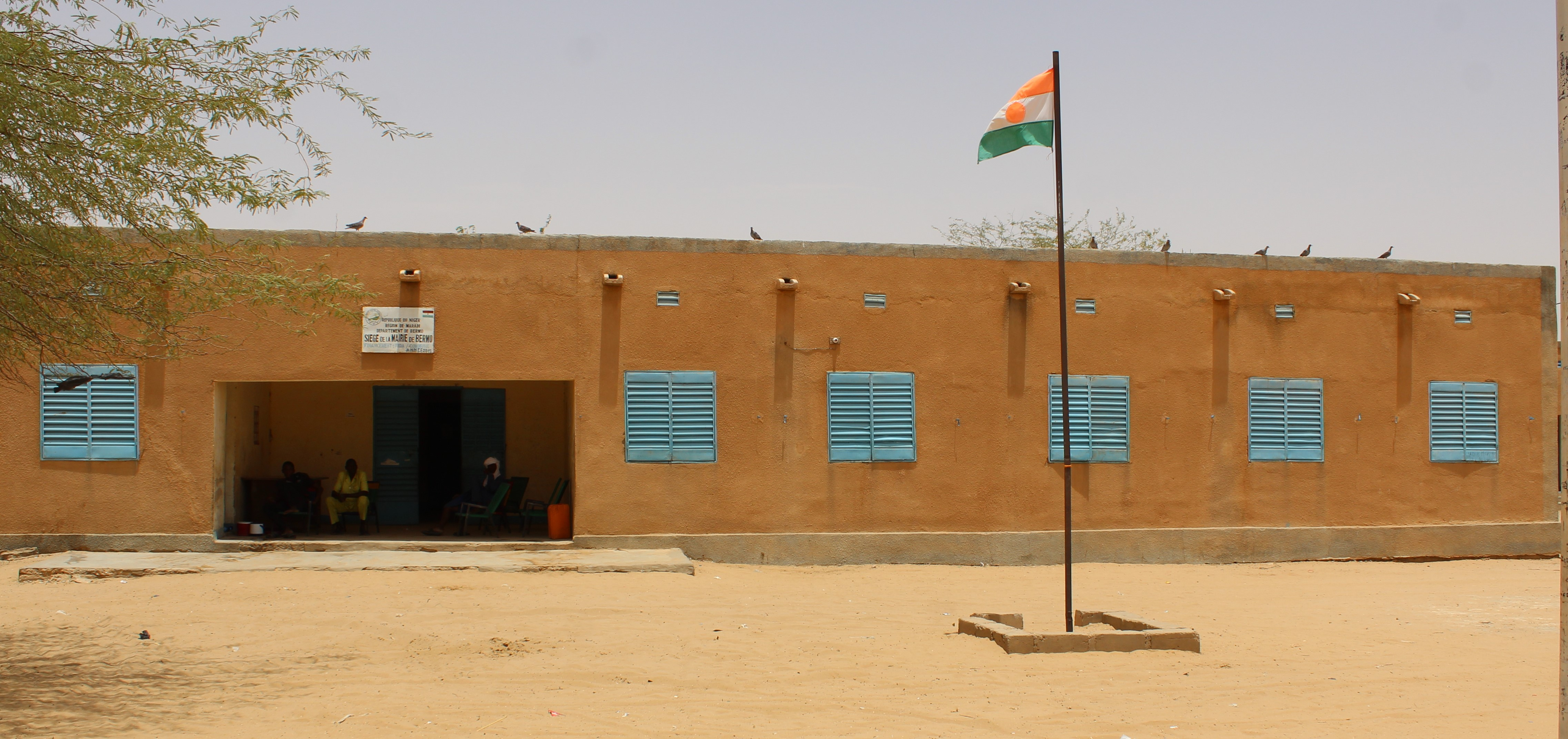
- Interactive map of Bermo, Niger
- Country: Niger

Area
  - Total: 220.7 sq mi (571.5 km^{2})
- Elevation: 1,302 ft (397 m)

Population (2012)
  - Total: 30,761
  - Density: 139.4/sq mi (53.83/km^{2})
- Time zone: UTC+1 (WAT)

Bermo, Niger is a village and rural commune in Niger. The region is suffering from soil erosion and recurring droughts due to climate change, which is negatively impacting cattle farmers and their families in Bermo. Oxfam and L’Association pour la Redynamisation de L’Elevage au Niger began providing humanitarian aid, HIV/AIDS education and skills training in the village in 2008.
