= Kanan-Bakache =

Coordinates: 13°51′52″N 7°49′37″E

- Commune and village
- Interactive map of Kanan-Bakache
- Country: Niger

Area
  - Total: 270.1 sq mi (699.6 km^{2})

Population (2012 census)
  - Total: 85,367
  - Density: 316.0/sq mi (122.0/km^{2})
- Time zone: UTC+1 (WAT)

Kanan-Bakache is a village and rural commune in Niger. As of 2012, it had a population of 85,367.
