= Golle, Niger =

Coordinates: 12°51′12″N 3°00′14″E

- Commune and village
- Interactive map of Golle, Niger
- Country: Niger

Area
  - Total: 498 sq mi (1,291 km^{2})

Population (2012 census)
  - Total: 27,860
  - Density: 55.89/sq mi (21.58/km^{2})
- Time zone: UTC+1 (WAT)

Golle, Niger is a village and rural commune in Niger. As of 2012, it had a population of 27,860.
