= Tama, Niger =

Coordinates: 14°17′N 5°46′E

- Commune and village
- Interactive map of Tama, Niger
- Country: Niger

Area
  - Total: 130.5 sq mi (338.1 km^{2})

Population (2012 census)
  - Total: 52,661
  - Density: 403.4/sq mi (155.8/km^{2})
- Time zone: UTC+1 (WAT)

Tama, Niger is a village and rural commune in Niger. As of 2012, it had a population of 52,661. The municipality covers an area of approximately 338.1 square kilometers. The local population mainly relies on rain-fed farming and livestock raising
