= MokkoStudio =

Visual Effects Company

Mokko Studio
- Industry: Animation and Special effects
- Founded: 2003
- Defunct: 2017
- Headquarters: Montreal, Quebec, Canada
- Website: MokkoStudio.com

Mokko Studio was a Canadian visual effects and animation firm. The company operated in three main markets, film, television and also commercials. The company employed over 70 artists, and was located in Montreal, Quebec, Canada. The company was co-founded by Danny Bergeron and Alain Lachance.

== Overview ==
Mokko Studio first began its operations in 2003, when the company was co-founded by Danny Bergeron and Alain Lachance. Since the company's inception, Bergeron has been responsible for leading the studio, while Lachance manages the creative side of the firm. Mokko has been responsible for working on various film projects such as Riddick and Underworld: Awakening.

== History ==
Since the company's foundation in 2003, they have worked on various projects. One of their early breaks came within the first year, when they worked on the visual effects for the video game The Lord of the Rings: War of the Ring. Over the next three years the company worked on a number of TV series, including Mars Rising and the CGI for Clash of the Dinosaurs.

Following the company's success in video games and TV series, they moved into film special effects and animation. Within the first few years, Mokko had developed effects and animation for the horror fil Silent Hill. and X-Men Origins: Wolverine. In 2012, the company received investment of $200,000 in order to expand their operations. In September 2013, they featured on StudioDaily.com after they designed a number of special effect creatures for the film Riddick. It was the third film of the trilogy, that was released in 2013. Mokko was responsible for designing lifelike jackals and mud demons for the film.
