= Adjekoria =

Coordinates: 14°14′59″N 6°52′33″E

- Commune and village
- Interactive map of Adjekoria
- Country: Niger
- Region: Maradi
- Department: Dakoro

Area
  - Total: 460 sq mi (1,190 km^{2})
- Elevation: 1,230 ft (375 m)

Population (2012 census)
  - Total: 79,108
  - Density: 172/sq mi (66.5/km^{2})
- Time zone: UTC+1 (WAT)

Adjekoria is a village and rural commune in Niger. As of 2012, it had a population of 79,108.
