= Fabidji =

- Commune and village
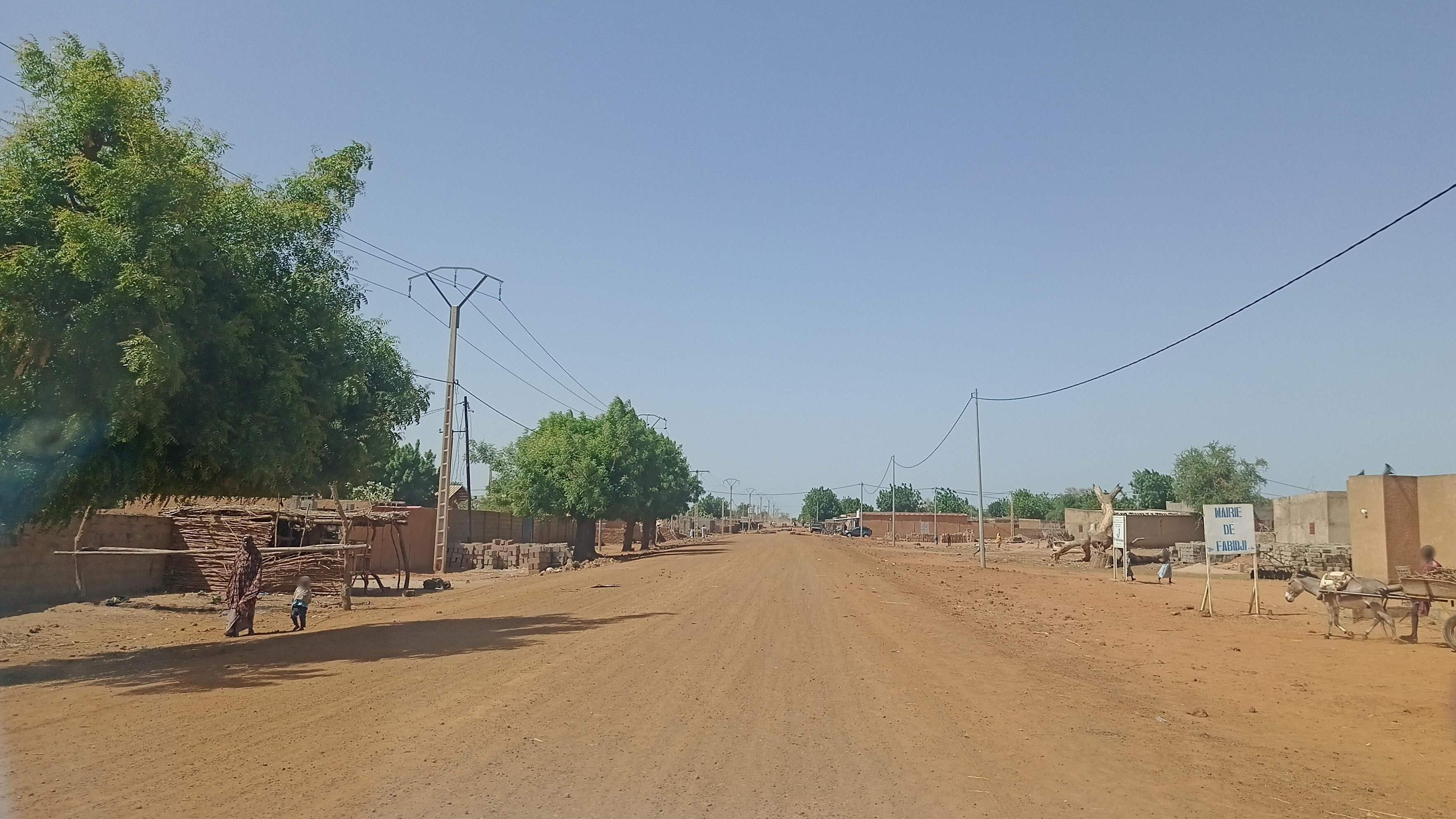

- Location in Niger
- Coordinates: 12°54′N 2°52′E
- Country: Niger

Area
  - Total: 271.5 sq mi (703.3 km^{2})

Population (2012 census)
  - Total: 39,713
  - Density: 146.2/sq mi (56.47/km^{2})
- Time zone: UTC+1 (WAT)

Fabidji is a village and rural commune in Niger. As of 2012, it had a population of 39,713.
