= Sabon-Guida =

Coordinates: 13°56′N 5°54′E

- Commune and village
- Interactive map of Sabon-Guida
- Country: Niger

Area
  - Total: 268.5 sq mi (695.4 km^{2})

Population (2012 census)
  - Total: 103,232
  - Density: 384.5/sq mi (148.4/km^{2})
- Time zone: UTC+1 (WAT)

Sabon-Guida is a village and rural commune in Niger. As of 2012, it had a population of 103,232.
