= Sarkin Haoussa =

Coordinates: 13°50′30″N 7°35′32″E

sherkin haoussa
- Commune and village
- Interactive map of sherkin haoussa
- Country: Niger

Area
  - Total: 263.8 sq mi (683.3 km^{2})

Population (2012 census)
  - Total: 76,312
  - Density: 289.3/sq mi (111.7/km^{2})
- Time zone: UTC+1 (WAT)

Sarkin Haoussa is a village and rural commune in Niger. As of 2012, it had a population of 76,312.
