= Mokko, Niger =

Coordinates: 13°10′35″N 3°16′19″E

- Commune and village
- Interactive map of Mokko, Niger
- Country: Niger
- Time zone: UTC+1 (WAT)

Mokko, Niger is a village and rural commune in Niger.
