= Guidimouni =

Rural commune in Niger

Coordinates: 13.688688°N 9.514160°E

- Commune and village
- Interactive map of Guidimouni
- Country: Niger

Area
  - Total: 368.4 sq mi (954.2 km^{2})

Population (2012 census)
  - Total: 69,587
  - Density: 188.9/sq mi (72.93/km^{2})
- Time zone: UTC+1 (WAT)

Guidimouni is a town in southern Niger. It is near the city of Zinder. As of 2012, it had a population of 69,587.
