= Azagor =

Coordinates: 14°39′50″N 6°55′02″E

- Commune and village
- Interactive map of Azagor
- Country: Niger
- Region: Maradi
- Department: Dakoro

Area
  - Total: 62.9 sq mi (162.8 km^{2})
- Elevation: 1,309 ft (399 m)

Population (2012)
  - Total: 5,565
  - Density: 88.53/sq mi (34.18/km^{2})
- Time zone: UTC+1 (WAT)

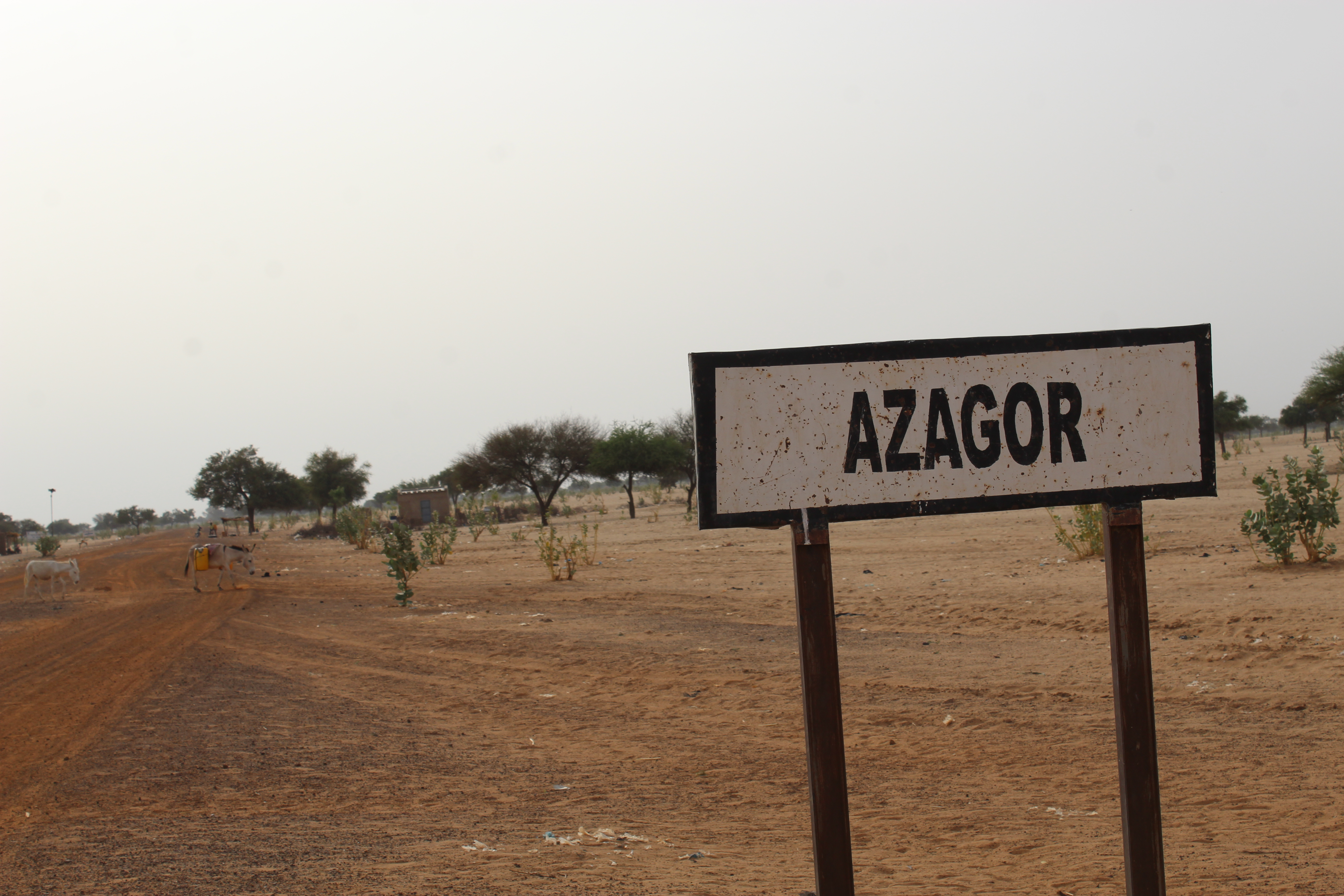
The rural municipality of Azagore

Azagor is a village and rural commune in Niger. As of 2012, it had a population of 5,565.
