= Roumboui =

Coordinates: 14°41′28″N 6°58′16″E

- Commune and village
- Interactive map of Roumboui
- Country: Niger

Area
  - Total: 196.0 sq mi (507.7 km^{2})

Population (2012 census)
  - Total: 13,330
  - Density: 68.00/sq mi (26.26/km^{2})
- Time zone: UTC+1 (WAT)

Roumboui is a village and rural commune in Niger. As of 2012, it had a population of 13,330.
