= Attantane =

Coordinates: 14°08′36″N 7°18′50″E

- Commune and village
- Interactive map of Attantane
- Country: Niger
- Region: Maradi
- Department: Mayahi

Area
  - Total: 272.2 sq mi (704.9 km^{2})
- Elevation: 1,263 ft (385 m)

Population (2012 census)
  - Total: 71,928
  - Density: 264.3/sq mi (102.0/km^{2})
- Time zone: UTC+1 (WAT)

Attantane is a village and rural commune in Niger. As of 2012, it had a population of 71,928.
