= Issawane =

Coordinates: 14°45′54″N 6°33′56″E

- Commune and village
- Interactive map of Issawane
- Country: Niger

Area
  - Total: 206.6 sq mi (535.0 km^{2})

Population (2012 census)
  - Total: 40,155
  - Density: 194.4/sq mi (75.06/km^{2})
- Time zone: UTC+1 (WAT)

Issawane is a village and rural commune in Niger.
