= Chadakori =

Coordinates: 13°36′59″N 7°01′49″E

- Commune and village
- Interactive map of Chadakori
- Country: Niger
- Elevation: 1,125 ft (343 m)

Population (2012)
  - Total: 108,711
- Time zone: UTC+1 (WAT)

Chadakori is a village and rural commune in Niger.
