= Gababedji =

Coordinates: 14°14′51″N 8°15′27″E

- Commune and village
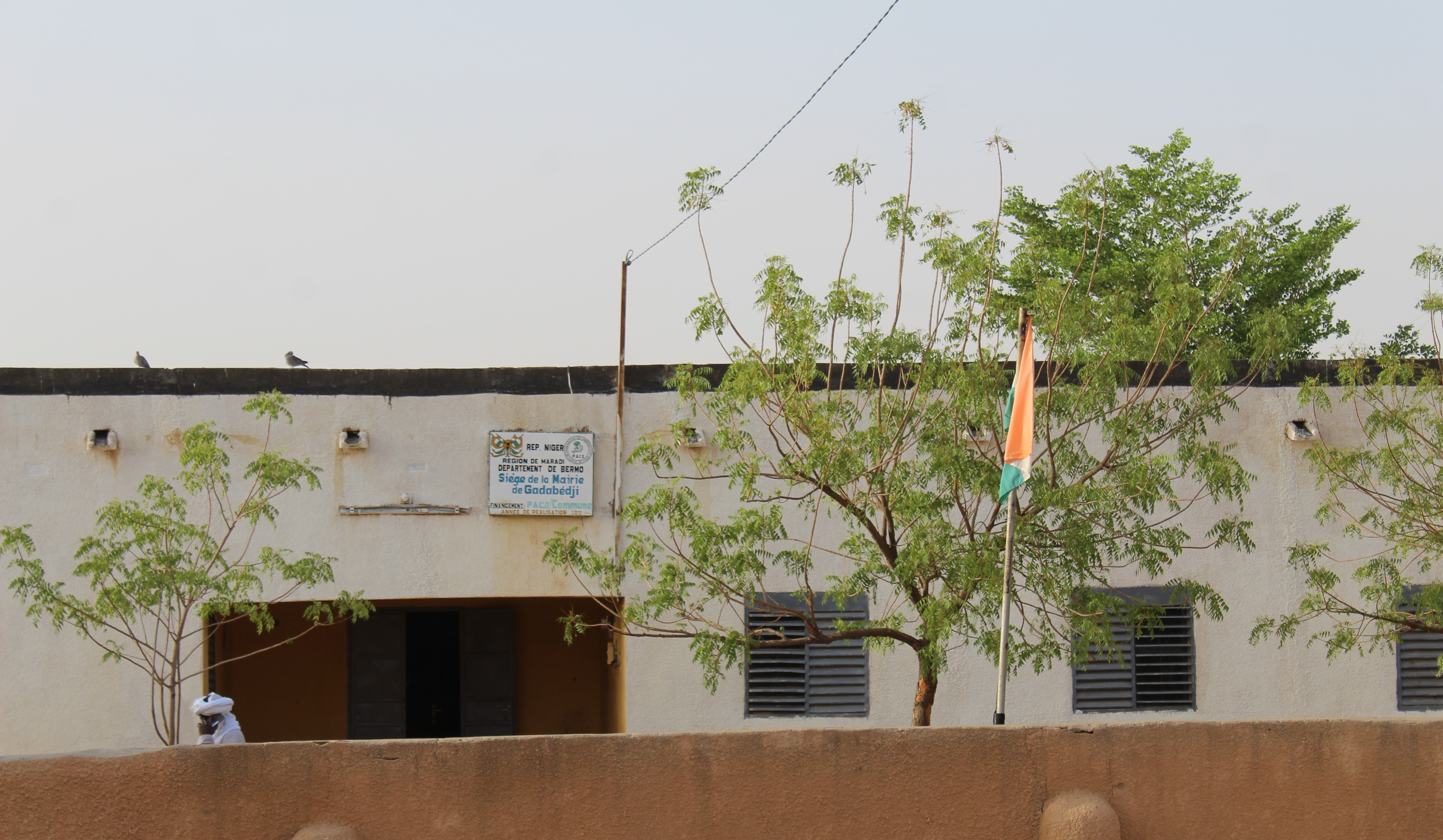
- Interactive map of Gababedji
- Country: Niger

Area
  - Total: 1,971 sq mi (5,104 km^{2})

Population (2012 census)
  - Total: 21,513
  - Density: 10.92/sq mi (4.215/km^{2})
- Time zone: UTC+1 (WAT)

Gababedji is a village and rural commune in Niger.
