= Djiratawa =

Coordinates: 13°24′N 7°08′E

- Commune and village
- Interactive map of Djiratawa
- Country: Niger

Area
  - Total: 203.5 sq mi (527.1 km^{2})

Population (2012 census)
  - Total: 85,976
  - Density: 422.5/sq mi (163.1/km^{2})
- Time zone: UTC+1 (WAT)

Djiratawa is a village and rural commune in Niger. As of 2012, it had a population of 85,976.
