= Safo, Niger =

Coordinates: 13°25′N 7°07′E

- Commune and village
- Interactive map of Safo, Niger
- Country: Niger

Area
  - Total: 289.9 sq mi (750.9 km^{2})

Population (2012 census)
  - Total: 76,454
  - Density: 263.7/sq mi (101.8/km^{2})
- Time zone: UTC+1 (WAT)

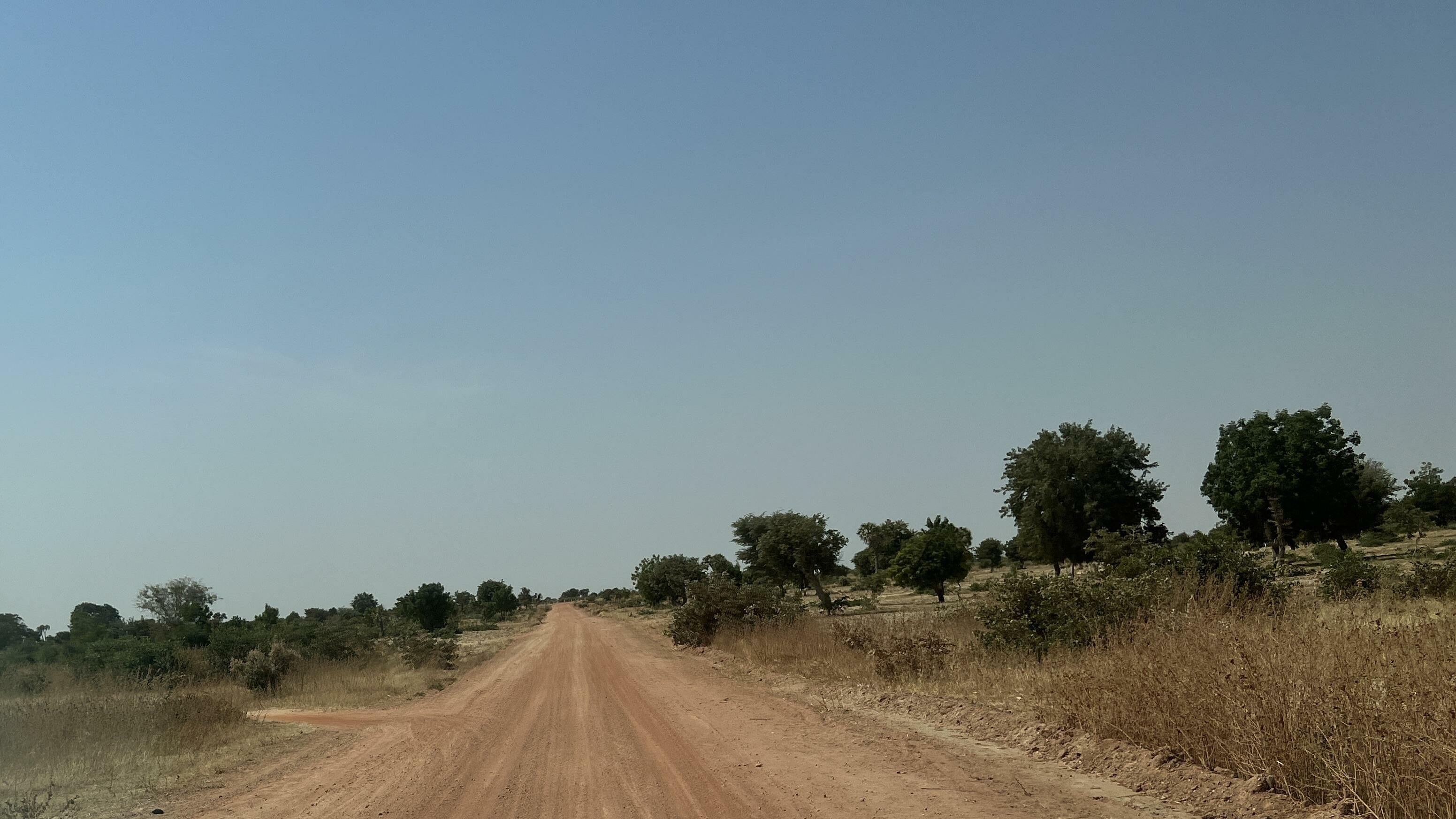
Safo, Niger

Safo, Niger is a village and rural commune in Niger. As of 2012, it had a population of 76,454.
