= Dan-Issa =

Coordinates: 13°12′17″N 7°15′27″E

- Commune and village
- Interactive map of Dan-Issa
- Country: Niger

Area
  - Total: 410 sq mi (1,060 km^{2})

Population (2012 census)
  - Total: 94,841
  - Density: 232/sq mi (89.5/km^{2})
- Time zone: UTC+1 (WAT)

Dan-Issa is a village and rural commune in Niger. As of 2012, it had a population of 94,841.

== History ==
Niger gold mine collapse
