= Kankandi =

Coordinates: 12°52′18″N 2°57′50″E

- Commune and village
- Interactive map of Kankandi
- Country: Niger

Area
  - Total: 83.6 sq mi (216.6 km^{2})

Population (2012 census)
  - Total: 16,565
  - Density: 198.1/sq mi (76.48/km^{2})
- Time zone: UTC+1 (WAT)

Kankandi is a village and rural commune in Niger. As of 2012, it had a population of 16,565.
