= Doguerawa =

Coordinates: 13°57′44″N 5°35′48″E

- Commune and village
- Interactive map of Doguerawa
- Country: Niger

Area
  - Total: 289.8 sq mi (750.6 km^{2})

Population (2012 census)
  - Total: 117,975
  - Density: 407.1/sq mi (157.2/km^{2})
- Time zone: UTC+1 (WAT)

Doguerawa is a village and rural commune in Niger. As of 2012, it had a population of 117,975. 8,673 people live in Doguerawa village.
