= Korahane =

Coordinates: 14°34′N 6°34′E

- Commune and village
- Interactive map of Korahane
- Country: Niger

Area
  - Total: 107.7 sq mi (279.0 km^{2})

Population (2012)
  - Total: 12,577
  - Density: 116.8/sq mi (45.08/km^{2})
- Time zone: UTC+1 (WAT)

Korahane (var. Korohan, Korohane) is a village and rural commune in Niger. As of 2012, it had a population of 12,577.
