= Ourno =

Coordinates: 14°18′N 6°27′E

- Commune and village
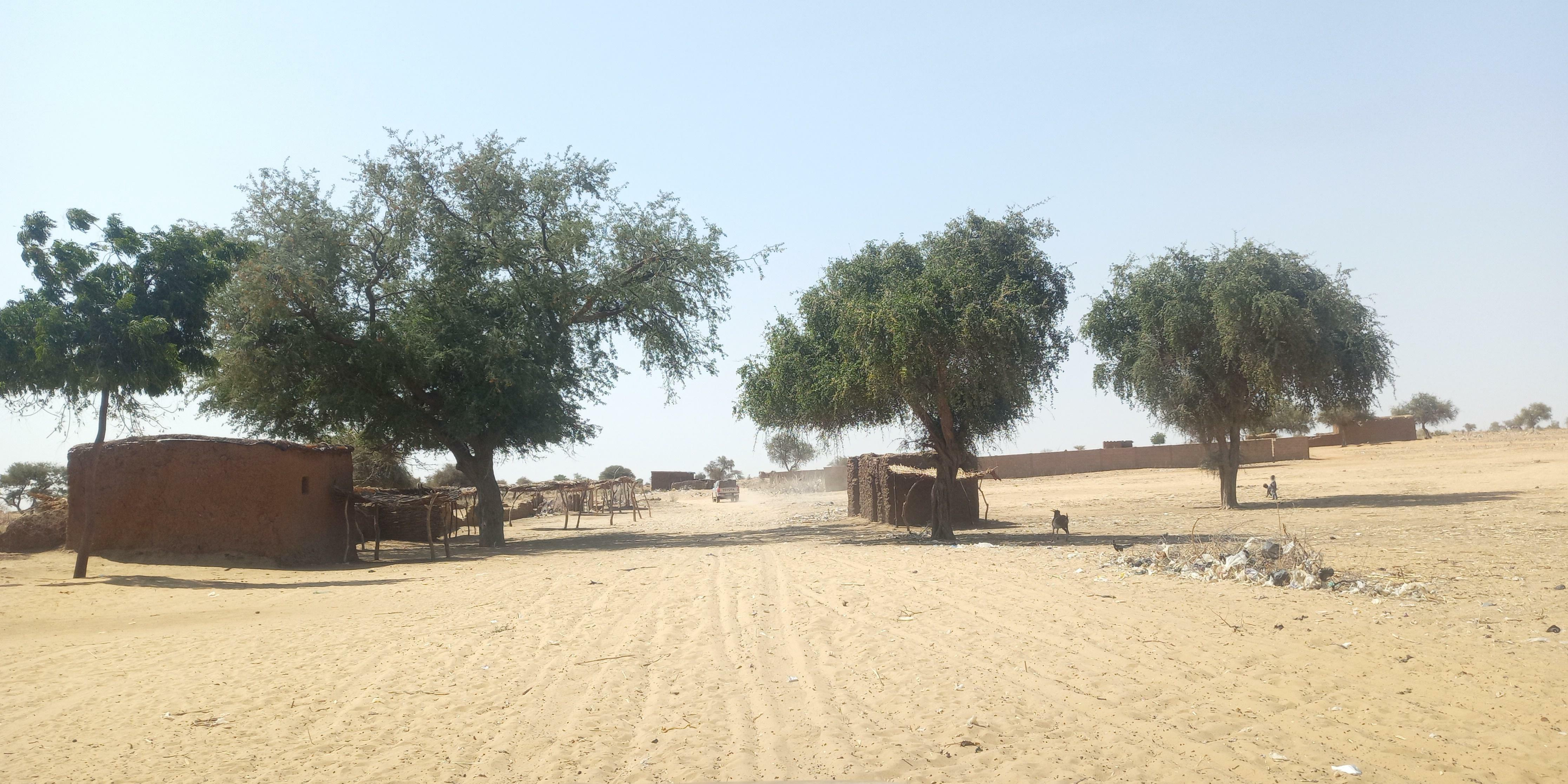
- Ourno
- Interactive map of Ourno
- Country: Niger

Area
  - Total: 461 sq mi (1,193 km^{2})

Population (2012 census)
  - Total: 98,769
  - Density: 214.4/sq mi (82.79/km^{2})
- Time zone: UTC+1 (WAT)

Ourno is a village and rural commune in Niger. As of 2012, it had a population of 98,769.
