= Dan-Goulbi =

Coordinates: 13°58′48″N 6°33′15″E

- Commune and village
- Interactive map of Dan-Goulbi
- Country: Niger

Area
  - Total: 429 sq mi (1,112 km^{2})

Population (2012 census)
  - Total: 57,228
  - Density: 133.3/sq mi (51.46/km^{2})
- Time zone: UTC+1 (WAT)

Dan-Goulbi is a village and rural commune in Niger. As of 2012, it had a population of 57,228.
