= Tchake =

Coordinates: 14°23′15″N 8°11′08″E

- Commune and village
- Interactive map of Tchake
- Country: Niger

Area
  - Total: 298.7 sq mi (773.5 km^{2})

Population (2012 census)
  - Total: 40,502
  - Density: 135.6/sq mi (52.36/km^{2})
- Time zone: UTC+1 (WAT)

Tchake is a village and rural commune in Niger. As of 2012, it had a population of 40,502.
