= Soucoucoutane =

Coordinates: 14°11′21″N 3°53′11″E

- Commune and village
- Interactive map of Soucoucoutane
- Country: Niger

Area
  - Total: 520 sq mi (1,350 km^{2})

Population (2012 census)
  - Total: 38,700
  - Density: 74.2/sq mi (28.7/km^{2})
- Time zone: UTC+1 (WAT)

Soucoucoutane is a village and rural commune in Niger. As of 2012, it had a population of 38,700.
