= Sarkin Yamma =

Coordinates: 13°21′32″N 6°55′50″E

- Commune and village
- Interactive map of Sarkin Yamma
- Country: Niger

Area
  - Total: 91.3 sq mi (236.4 km^{2})

Population (2012 census)
  - Total: 36,557
  - Density: 400.5/sq mi (154.6/km^{2})
- Time zone: UTC+1 (WAT)

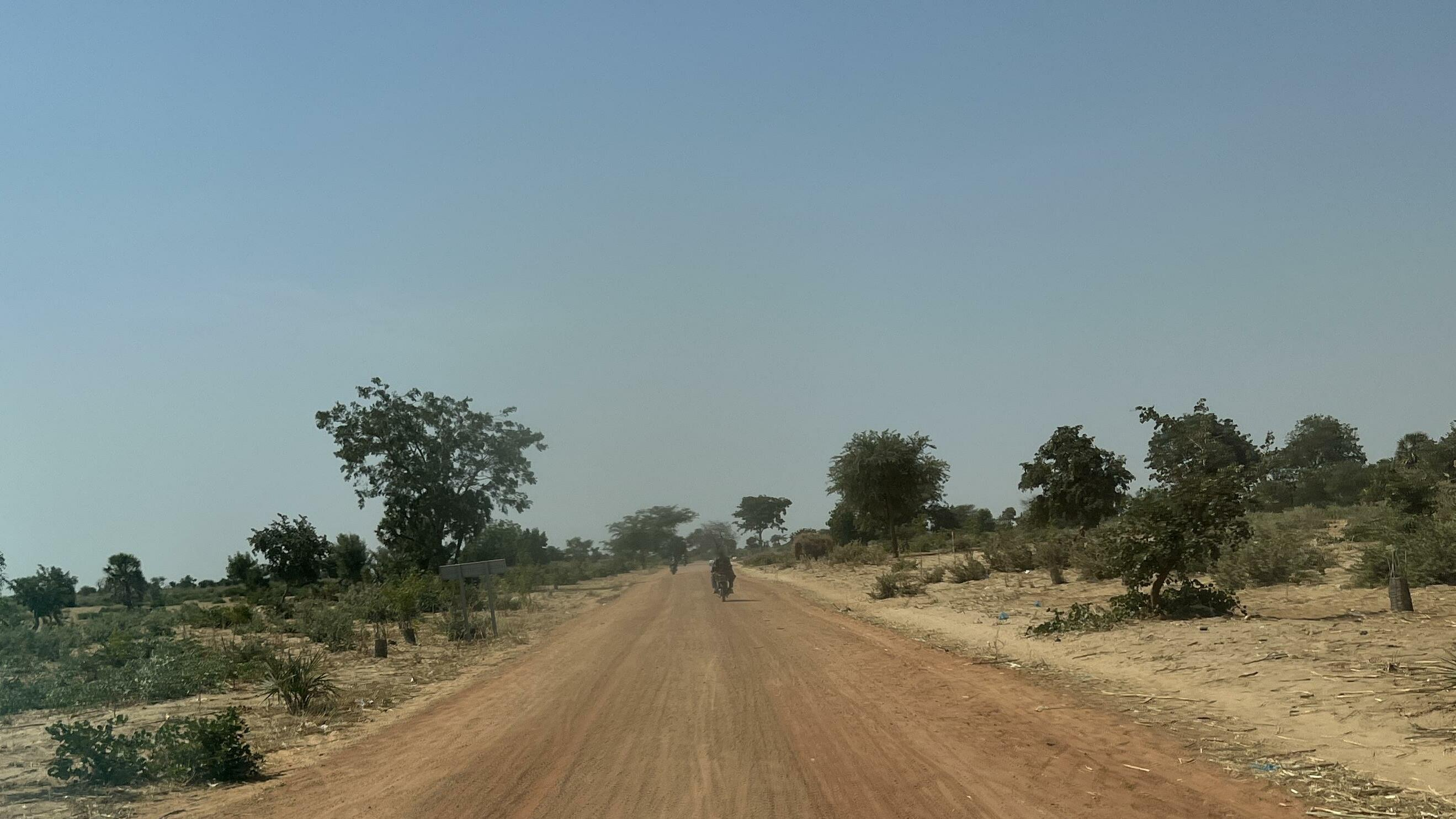
A road in Sarkin Yamma

Sarkin Yamma is a village and rural commune in Niger. As of 2012, it had a population of 36,557.
