= Birni Lalle =

Coordinates: 14°26′N 6°46′E

- Commune and village
- Interactive map of Birni Lalle
- Country: Niger

Area
  - Total: 265.7 sq mi (688.2 km^{2})
- Elevation: 1,350 ft (410 m)

Population (2012)
  - Total: 30,846
  - Density: 116.1/sq mi (44.82/km^{2})
- Time zone: UTC+1 (WAT)

Birni Lalle is a village and rural commune in Niger.
