= Guecheme =

Coordinates: 12°54′N 3°53′E

- Commune and village
- Interactive map of Guecheme
- Country: Niger

Area
  - Total: 443 sq mi (1,147 km^{2})

Population (2012 census)
  - Total: 108,778
  - Density: 245.6/sq mi (94.84/km^{2})
- Time zone: UTC+1 (WAT)

Guecheme is a village and rural commune in Niger. As of 2012, it had a population of 108,778.
