= Matankari =

Rural commune in Niger

Coordinates: 13.8061°N 4.0320°E

- Commune and village
- Interactive map of Matankari
- Country: Niger

Area
  - Total: 586 sq mi (1,518 km^{2})

Population (2012 census)
  - Total: 68,979
  - Density: 117.7/sq mi (45.44/km^{2})
- Time zone: UTC+1 (WAT)

Matankari is a town in southwestern Niger. It is near the city of Niamey. As of 2012, it had a population of 68,979.
