= Daouche =

Coordinates: 13°25′N 8°21′E

- Commune and village
- Interactive map of Daouche
- Country: Niger

Area
  - Total: 60.0 sq mi (155.3 km^{2})

Population (2012 census)
  - Total: 37,754
  - Density: 629.6/sq mi (243.1/km^{2})
- Time zone: UTC+1 (WAT)

Daouche is a village and rural commune in Niger. As of 2012, it had a population of 37,754.
