= Foulatari =

Coordinates: 13°33′N 12°03′E

- Commune and village
- Interactive map of Foulatari
- Country: Niger

Area
  - Total: 242.2 sq mi (627.3 km^{2})

Population (2012 census)
  - Total: 30,953
  - Density: 127.8/sq mi (49.34/km^{2})
- Time zone: UTC+1 (WAT)

Foulatari is a village and rural commune in Niger. As of 2012, it had a population of 30,953.
