= Dan-Barto =

Coordinates: 13°11′50″N 8°19′15″E

- Commune and village
- Interactive map of Dan-Barto
- Country: Niger
- Region: Zinder

Area
  - Total: 76.4 sq mi (198.0 km^{2})

Population (2012 census)
  - Total: 40,900
  - Density: 535/sq mi (207/km^{2})
- Time zone: UTC+1 (WAT)

Dan-Barto is a village and rural commune in Niger. As of 2012, it had a population of 40,900.
