= Dan-Kassari =

Coordinates: 13°31′24″N 3°10′44″E

- Commune and village
- Interactive map of Dan-Kassari
- Country: Niger

Area
  - Total: 621 sq mi (1,609 km^{2})

Population (2012 census)
  - Total: 78,132
  - Density: 125.8/sq mi (48.56/km^{2})
- Time zone: UTC+1 (WAT)

Dan-Kassari is a village and rural commune in Niger. As of 2012, it had a population of 78,132.
