= Tagriss =

Coordinates: 13°40′39″N 7°10′00″E

- Commune and village
- Interactive map of Tagriss
- Country: Niger

Area
  - Total: 623 sq mi (1,613 km^{2})

Population (2012 census)
  - Total: 53,925
  - Density: 86.59/sq mi (33.43/km^{2})
- Time zone: UTC+1 (WAT)

Tagriss is a village and rural commune in Niger. As of 2012, it had a population of 53,925.
