= Guidan Amoumoune =

- Commune and village
- Location in Niger
- Coordinates: 14°15′42″N 7°23′21″E
- Country: Niger

Area
  - Total: 446 sq mi (1,156 km^{2})

Population (2012 census)
  - Total: 88,199
  - Density: 197.6/sq mi (76.30/km^{2})
- Time zone: UTC+1 (WAT)

Guidan Amoumoune is a village and rural commune in Niger. As of 2012, it had a population of 88,199.
