= Ourafane =

- Commune and village
- Location in Niger
- Coordinates: 14°04′N 8°08′E
- Country: Niger

Area
  - Total: 896 sq mi (2,321 km^{2})

Population (2012 census)
  - Total: 137,850
  - Density: 153.8/sq mi (59.39/km^{2})
- Time zone: UTC+1 (WAT)

Ourafane is a village and rural commune in Niger. As of 2012, it had a population of 137,850.
