= N'Gourti =

Coordinates: 15.3308°N 13.2006°E

- Commune
- Interactive map of N'Gourti
- Country: Niger

Area
  - Commune: 43,816 sq mi (113,484 km^{2})

Population (2012 census)
  - Commune: 51,767
  - Density: 1.1815/sq mi (0.45616/km^{2})
  - Urban: 1,627
- Time zone: UTC+1 (WAT)

N'Gourti is a village and rural commune in Niger.

At the 2012 census, the total population of the commune was 51,767.
