= Fakara =

Coordinates: 13°30′46″N 3°09′09″E

- Commune and village
- Interactive map of Fakara
- Country: Niger

Area
  - Total: 219.5 sq mi (568.6 km^{2})

Population (2012 census)
  - Total: 19,077
  - Density: 86.90/sq mi (33.55/km^{2})
- Time zone: UTC+1 (WAT)

Fakara is a village and rural commune in Niger. As of 2012, it had a population of 19,077.
