= Korgom =

Coordinates: 13°27′08″N 8°15′13″E

- Commune and village
- Interactive map of Korgom
- Country: Niger

Area
  - Total: 256.9 sq mi (665.3 km^{2})

Population (2012 census)
  - Total: 68,057
  - Density: 264.9/sq mi (102.3/km^{2})
- Time zone: UTC+1 (WAT)

Korgom is a village and rural commune in Niger. As of 2012, it had a population of 68,057.
