= Dogonkiria =

Coordinates: 14°04′N 4°21′E

- Commune and village
- Interactive map of Dogonkiria
- Country: Niger

Area
  - Total: 1,007 sq mi (2,608 km^{2})

Population (2012 census)
  - Total: 65,990
  - Density: 65.53/sq mi (25.30/km^{2})
- Time zone: UTC+1 (WAT)

Dogonkiria is a village and rural commune in Niger. As of 2012, it had a population of 65,990.
