= Gabi, Niger =

Coordinates: 13°14′N 7°03′E

Gabi Gabi
- Commune and village
- Location in Niger
- Country: Niger

Area
  - Total: 301.9 sq mi (781.8 km^{2})

Population (2012 census)
  - Total: 83,203
  - Density: 275.6/sq mi (106.4/km^{2})
- Time zone: UTC+1 (WAT)

Gabi is a village and rural commune in Niger. As of 2012, it had a population of 83,203.
