= Sae Saboua =

Coordinates: 13°35′N 7°22′E

- Commune and village
- Interactive map of Sae Saboua
- Country: Niger

Area
  - Total: 250.2 sq mi (647.9 km^{2})

Population (2012 census)
  - Total: 99,638
  - Density: 398.3/sq mi (153.8/km^{2})
- Time zone: UTC+1 (WAT)

Sae Saboua is a village and rural commune in Niger. As of 2012, it had a population of 99,638.
