= Madarounfa =

Coordinates: 13°19′N 7°09′E

- Commune and town
- Interactive map of Madarounfa
- Country: Niger

Area
  - Commune and town: 120.0 sq mi (310.8 km^{2})
- Elevation: 1,198 ft (365 m)

Population (2012 census)
  - Commune and town: 71,832
  - Density: 598.6/sq mi (231.1/km^{2})
  - Urban: 12,220
- Time zone: UTC+1 (WAT)

Madarounfa is a town and urban commune in Niger. As of 2012, it had a population of 71,832.
