= Sassoumbroum =

Coordinates: 13°07′02″N 8°19′11″E

- Commune and village
- Interactive map of Sassoumbroum
- Country: Niger
- Region: Zinder
- Department: Magaria

Area
  - Total: 149.6 sq mi (387.4 km^{2})

Population (2012 census)
  - Total: 78,163
  - Density: 522.6/sq mi (201.8/km^{2})
- Time zone: UTC+1 (WAT)

Sassoumbroum is a village and rural commune in the Magaria Department of the Zinder Region of Niger. As of 2012, it had a population of 78,163.
