= Moa, Niger =

Coordinates: 14°10′N 9°46′E

- Commune and village
- Interactive map of Moa, Niger
- Country: Niger

Area
  - Total: 364.1 sq mi (942.9 km^{2})

Population (2012 census)
  - Total: 26,632
  - Density: 73.15/sq mi (28.24/km^{2})
- Time zone: UTC+1 (WAT)

Moa, Niger is a village and rural commune in Niger. As of 2012, it had a population of 26,632.
