= Guilladje =

Coordinates: 12°39′18″N 2°54′42″E

- Commune and village
- Interactive map of Guilladje
- Country: Niger

Area
  - Total: 153.4 sq mi (397.4 km^{2})

Population (2012 census)
  - Total: 28,156
  - Density: 183.5/sq mi (70.85/km^{2})
- Time zone: UTC+1 (WAT)

Guilladje is a village and rural commune in Niger. As of 2012, it had a population of 26,776.
