= Guidan Sori =

Coordinates: 13°32′N 6°53′E

- Commune and village
- Interactive map of Guidan Sori
- Country: Niger

Area
  - Total: 273.4 sq mi (708.1 km^{2})

Population (2012 census)
  - Total: 93,771
  - Density: 343.0/sq mi (132.4/km^{2})
- Time zone: UTC+1 (WAT)

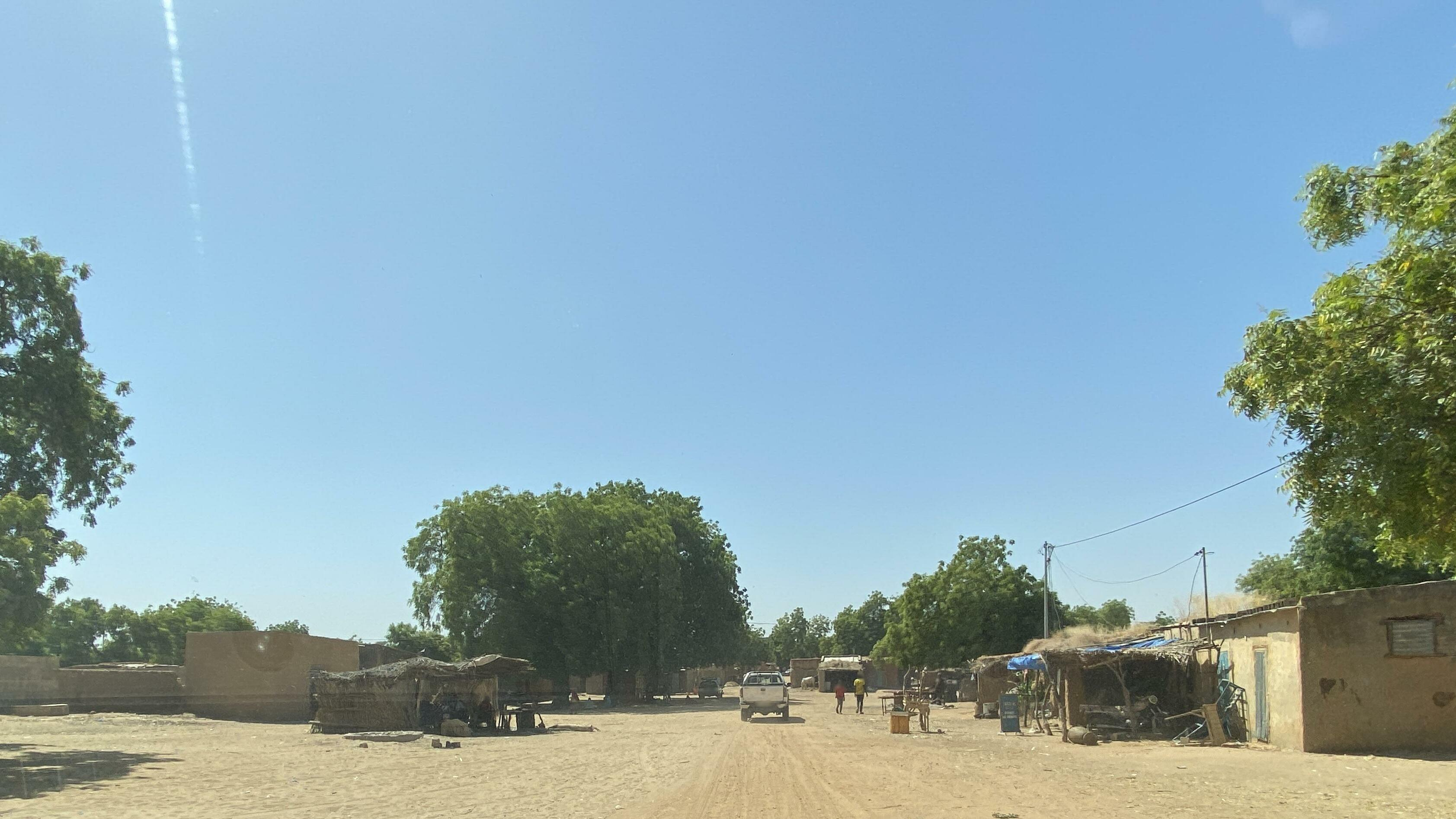
Guidan Sori

Guidan Sori is a village and rural commune in Niger. As of 2012, it had a population of 93,771.
