= Sabon-Machi =

Coordinates: 13°52′18″N 6°58′27″E

- Commune and village
- Interactive map of Sabon-Machi
- Country: Niger

Area
  - Total: 126.9 sq mi (328.6 km^{2})

Population (2012 census)
  - Total: 35,988
  - Density: 283.7/sq mi (109.5/km^{2})
- Time zone: UTC+1 (WAT)

Sabon-Machi is a village and rural commune in Niger. As of 2012, it had a population of 35,988.
