= Maiyara =

Coordinates: 13°58′27″N 7°18′55″E

- Commune and village
- Interactive map of Maiyara
- Country: Niger

Area
  - Total: 226.8 sq mi (587.4 km^{2})

Population (2012 census)
  - Total: 62,441
  - Density: 275.3/sq mi (106.3/km^{2})
- Time zone: UTC+1 (WAT)

Maiyara is a village and rural commune in Niger. As of 2012, it had a population of 62,441.
