= Damagaram Takaya =

Coordinates: 14°08′N 9°29′E

- Department and village
- Interactive map of Damagaram Takaya
- Country: Niger

Government
  - Type: préfecture
  - Prefet: Sahirou Abou Maman Nouri

Area
  - Total: 705 sq mi (1,826 km^{2})
- Elevation: 1,427 ft (435 m)

Population (2012 census)
  - Total: 61,580
  - Density: 87.34/sq mi (33.72/km^{2})
- Time zone: UTC+1 (WAT)

Damagaram Takaya is a village and rural Department of Niger. As of 2012, it had a population of 61,580.
