= Galma Koudawatche =

Coordinates: 14°05′09″N 5°47′53″E

- Commune and village
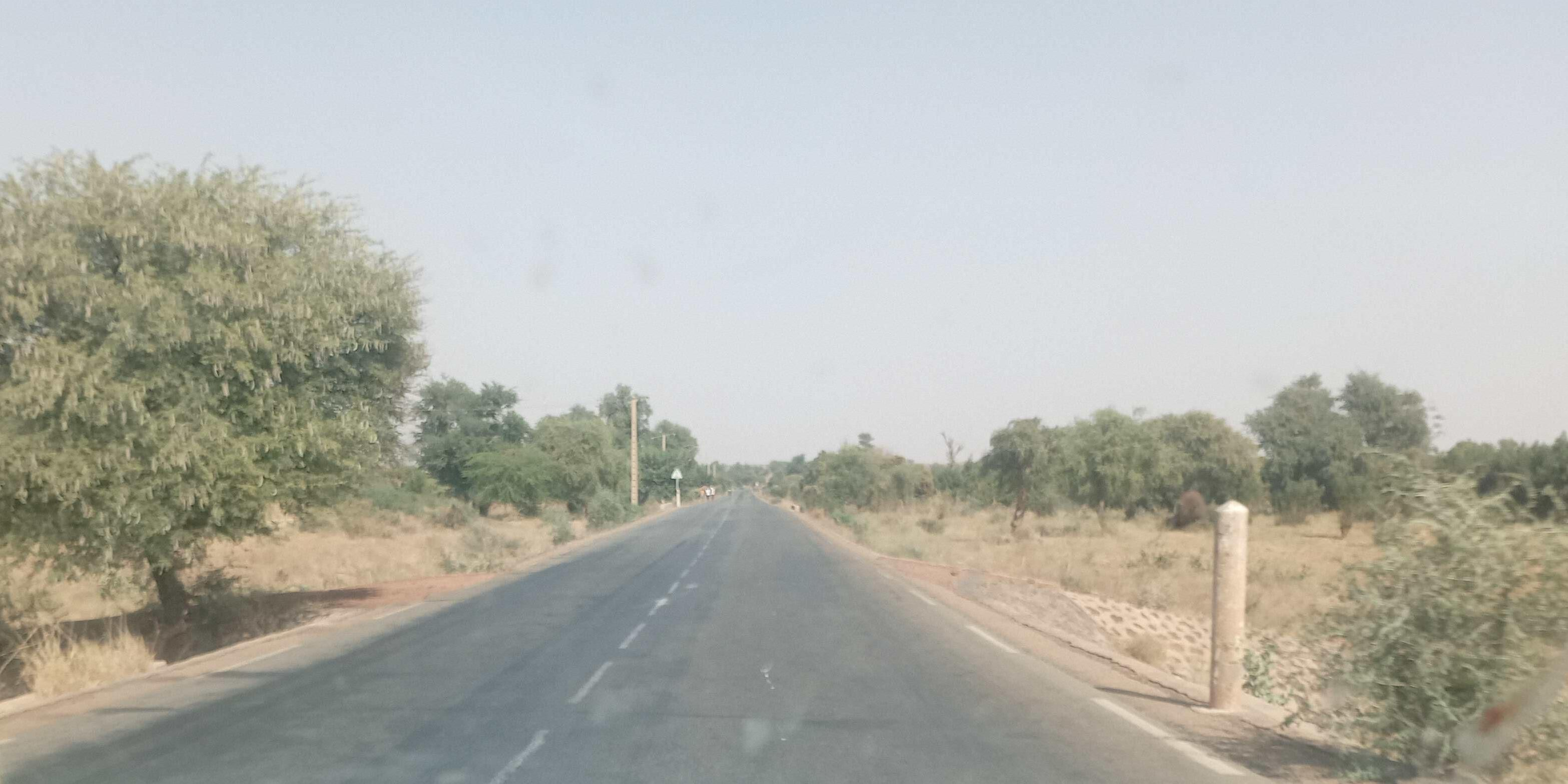
- Interactive map of Galma Koudawatche
- Country: Niger

Area
  - Total: 133.4 sq mi (345.5 km^{2})

Population (2012 census)
  - Total: 57,255
  - Density: 429.2/sq mi (165.7/km^{2})
- Time zone: UTC+1 (WAT)

Galma Koudawatche is a village and rural commune in Niger. As of 2012, it had a population of 57,255.
