= Koygolo =

Coordinates: 13°29′N 3°01′E

- Commune and village
- Interactive map of Koygolo
- Country: Niger

Area
  - Total: 171.8 sq mi (444.9 km^{2})

Population (2012 census)
  - Total: 48,218
  - Density: 280.7/sq mi (108.4/km^{2})
- Time zone: UTC+1 (WAT)

Koygolo is a village and rural commune in Niger. As of 2012, it had a population of 48,218.
