= Dogo, Niger =

Coordinates: 13°29′57″N 9°01′01″E

Dogo, Niger Duchi Dongondoutchi
- Commune and village
- Nickname: Dosso
- Interactive map of Dogo, Niger
- Country: Niger

Area
  - Total: 350.8 sq mi (908.5 km^{2})

Population (2012 census)
  - Total: 113,447
  - Density: 323.4/sq mi (124.9/km^{2})
- Time zone: UTC+1 (WAT)

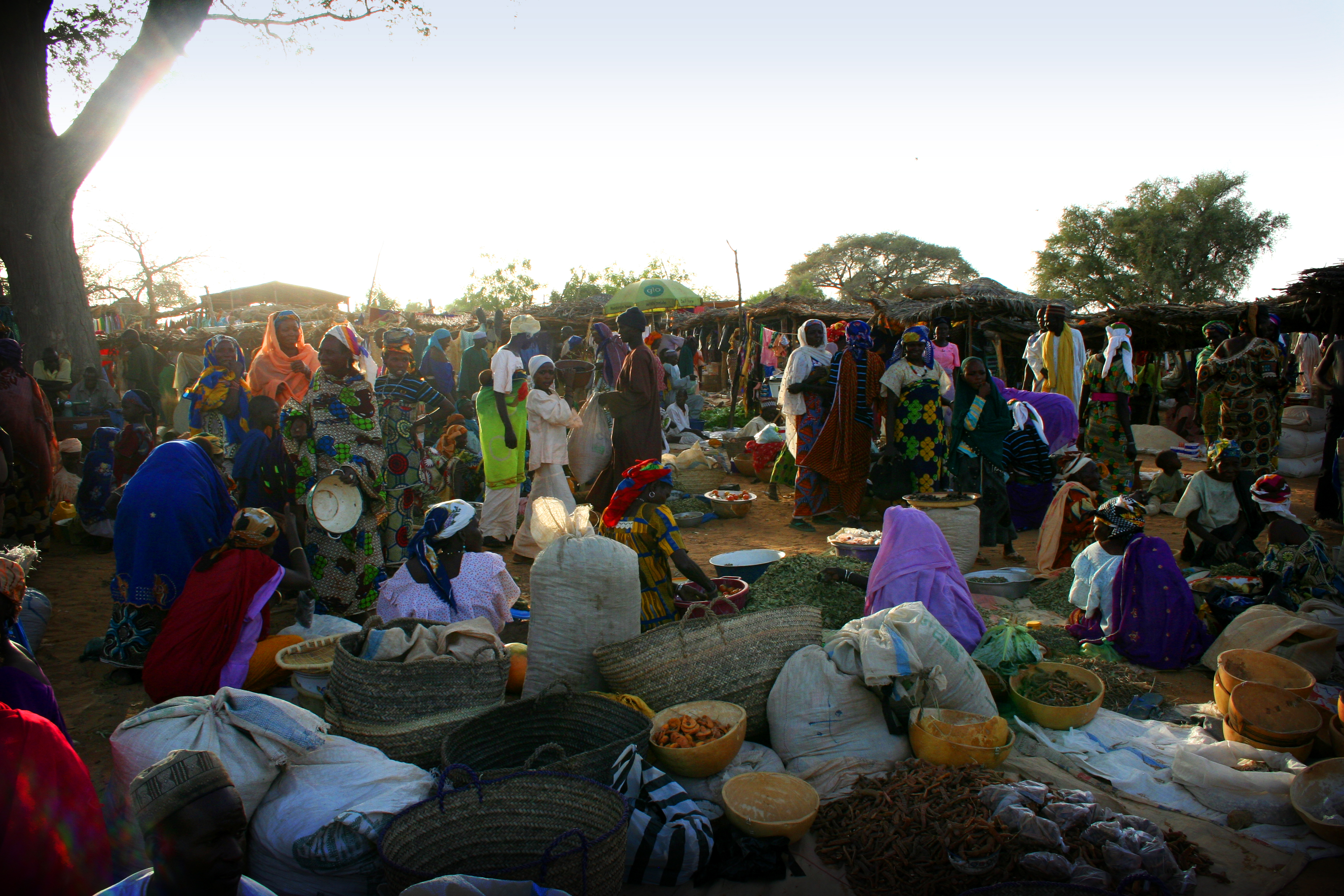
Marketplace in Dogo, Niger

Dogo, Niger is a village and rural commune in Niger. As of 2012, it had a population of 113,447.
