= N'Gonga =

Coordinates: 13°10′22″N 2°49′55″E

- Commune and village
- Interactive map of N'Gonga
- Country: Niger
- Time zone: UTC+1 (WAT)

N'Gonga is a village and rural commune in Niger.
There is a big and colorful weekly market on Saturdays.
