= Kantche =

- Commune and village
- Location in Niger
- Coordinates: 13°32′N 8°28′E
- Country: Niger
- Region: Zinder
- Department: Matameye

Area
  - Total: 127.1 sq mi (329.3 km^{2})
- Elevation: 1,342 ft (409 m)

Population (2012 census)
  - Total: 56,468
  - Density: 444.1/sq mi (171.5/km^{2})
- Time zone: UTC+1 (WAT)

Kantche is a village and rural commune in Niger. As of 2012, it had a population of 56,468.
