= Tsaouni =

Coordinates: 13°23′10″N 8°27′14″E

- Commune and village
- Interactive map of Tsaouni
- Country: Niger
- Region: Zinder
- Department: Matamèye

Area
  - Total: 66.4 sq mi (171.9 km^{2})

Population (2012 census)
  - Total: 37,854
  - Density: 570.3/sq mi (220.2/km^{2})
- Time zone: UTC+1 (WAT)

Tsaouni Tsouni is a rural commune in Niger, located in the Tillabéri Region, which is in the southwestern part of the country. The commune covers an area of approximately 1,457 square kilometers and has an estimated population of around 38,000 people. The main ethnic groups living in the area are the Hausa people, Dendi people, and Peulh.

== Agriculture ==
Tsouni is primarily an agricultural area, with crops such as millet, sorghum, and cowpeas being grown in the region. Livestock rearing, particularly cattle and goats, is also an important activity in the area.

== Transportation ==
In terms of transportation, Tsouni is connected to the rest of the region through a network of unpaved roads, and there is a weekly market that takes place in the town of Tsouni where locals can buy and sell goods. The nearest major city to Tsouni is Téra, which is located approximately 50 kilometers to the southeast.
