= Ichirnawa =

Coordinates: 13°31′55″N 8°20′27″E

- Commune and village
- Interactive map of Ichirnawa
- Country: Niger

Area
  - Total: 152.8 sq mi (395.8 km^{2})

Population (2012 census)
  - Total: 42,582
  - Density: 278.6/sq mi (107.6/km^{2})
- Time zone: UTC+1 (WAT)

Ichirnawa is a village and rural commune in Niger. As of 2012, it had a population of 42,582.
