= Wame, Niger =

Coordinates: 14°09′N 9°11′E

Wame Wamé
- Commune and village
- Interactive map of Wame
- Country: Niger
- Region: Zinder
- Department: Mirriah

Area
  - Total: 437 sq mi (1,132 km^{2})

Population (2012 census)
  - Total: 43,568
  - Density: 99.68/sq mi (38.49/km^{2})
- Time zone: UTC+1 (WAT)

Wame is a village and rural commune in Niger. As of 2012, it had a population of 43,568.
