= Doungou =

- Commune and village
- Location in Niger
- Coordinates: 13°25′00″N 8°38′06″E
- Country: Niger

Area
  - Total: 93.2 sq mi (241.5 km^{2})
- Elevation: 1,217 ft (371 m)

Population (2012)
  - Total: 39,031
  - Density: 418.6/sq mi (161.6/km^{2})
- Time zone: UTC+1 (WAT)

Doungou is a village and rural commune in Niger. As of 2012, it had a population of 39,031.
