= Malbaza =

- Commune and village
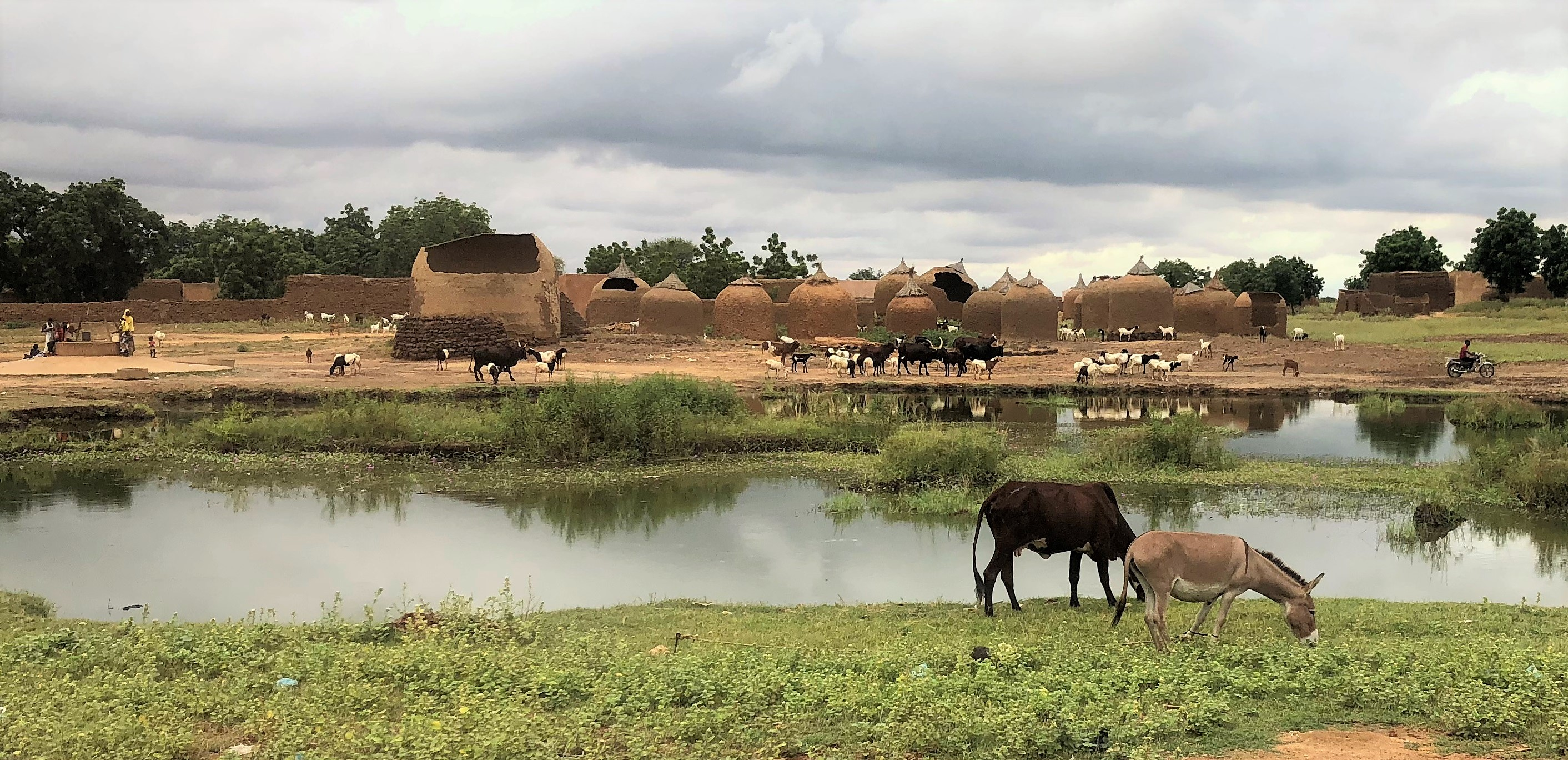
- Village in Malbaza

- Location in Niger
- Coordinates: 13°57′35″N 5°30′30″E
- Country: Niger

Area
  - Total: 272.5 sq mi (705.8 km^{2})

Population (2012 census)
  - Total: 114,432
  - Density: 419.9/sq mi (162.1/km^{2})
- Time zone: UTC+1 (WAT)

Malbaza is a village and rural commune in Niger. As of 2012, it had a population of 114,432.
