= Kourni =

Coordinates: 13°13′N 8°27′E

- Commune and village
- Interactive map of Kourni
- Country: Niger

Area
  - Total: 61.8 sq mi (160.1 km^{2})

Population (2012 census)
  - Total: 28,872
  - Density: 467.1/sq mi (180.3/km^{2})
- Time zone: UTC+1 (WAT)

Kourni is a village and rural commune in Niger. As of 2012, it had a population of 28,872.
