= List of terrorist incidents in Niger =

This is a list of incidents in Niger that are considered terrorism.

== Background ==
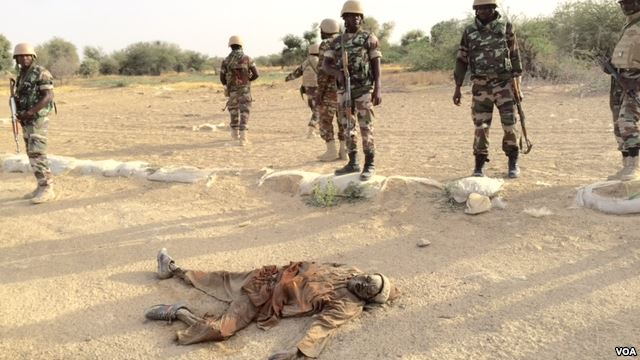
Niger Army soldiers with a killed Boko Haram fighter in Diffa after the 2015 Niger raid.

Niger became one of the main allies of the United States in the African theater of the war on terror. It joined the Pan Sahel Initiative in 2003 and the Trans-Saharan Counterterrorism Initiative in 2007.

Islamist terrorism is common in Niger, but it has historically targeted the government and Westerners instead of Nigerien civilians. The number of incidents spiked multiple times in the 1990s and late 2000s. A significant increase took place in 2014 and 2015, with over 40 incidents taking place in 2015. In June 2013, between 5,000 and 10,000 refugees arrived in Bosso, fleeing and fighting between Boko Haram and the Nigerian Armed Forces in Borno State of Nigeria. Most blamed the military for the excessive violence and human rights violations. The border town of Diffa is separated from Nigeria by the Komadougou Yobe river, a recent drop in the river's water level granted large groups of Nigerian refugees the opportunity to flee rebel controlled areas into the yet unaffected Niger. On 5 February 2015, a Nigerien parliament spokesman announced that discussions will be held regarding Niger's participation in the anti Boko Haram military operations.

In July 2023, disgruntled officers overthrew Nigerien president Mohamed Bazoum in a coup, claiming that Bazoum's government was not effectively countering the insurgencies of the Islamic State in the Greater Sahara and Jama'at Nasr al-Islam wal-Muslimin in the western part of the country. JNIM and ISGS are most active in the tri-border area between Niger, Mali, and Burkina Faso, the latter two having had coups that installed military juntas within the past two years. Since the coup, jihadist attacks escalated, with an attack in Koutougou in August 2023 killing 17 soldiers and an attack in Tabatol killing at least sixty Nigerien soldiers.

== Incidents ==
- 19 September 1989 – UTA Flight 772 was blown up over Niger, killing all 156 passengers and 14 crew members. The plane, traveling from Brazzaville to Paris, was destroyed during its flight and crashed in the Sahara Desert. The French air force confirmed that there were no survivors two days later. Six Libyans were tried in absentia for the attack by a French court in 1999 and found guilty.
- 23 May 2013 – Agadez attack
- 23 May 2013 – Arlit attack
- 14 February 2014 – On 24 February 2014 30 members of Boko Haram, an Islamic sect in northeastern Nigeria, attacked the island of Karamga near Lake Chad, leaving seven soldiers and many civilians dead. Since the group had been designated by the US as a "terrorist" organisation in 2009, they had carried out several cross-border attacks but this attack was the first attack on the Republic of Chad.
- 6 February 2015 – On 6 February 2015 there was an assault on the Nigerien towns Bosso and Diffa, perpetrated by Boko Haram. The incident occurred on 6 February 2015, marking the first major Boko Haram incursion into Niger. On the morning of 6 February 2015, Boko Haram militants carried out an assault on the Nigerien towns of Bosso and Diffa, after crossing into Niger from neighboring Nigeria. The Nigerien military successfully repelled the attacks with the aid of Chadian troops that have been stationed in Bosso since 2 February, the Chadian airforce also played a supporting role in the clashes. Dozens of militants were killed as Boko Haram retreated back into its stronghold in Nigeria. Nigerien casualties amounted to 4 killed, plus several civilians of which 17 was wounded.
- 4 October 2017 – A force of 40 to 50 militants on motorcycles attacked a group of 12 American soldiers on patrol in Tongo Tongo. The United States described the attack as the consequence of an "intelligence failure" and opened an investigation. The incident increased public awareness of the U.S. Armed Forces' presence in Africa. Four Americans were killed and two more were injured. 21 of the militants were killed. The United States accused the Islamic State in the Greater Sahara of being behind the attack.
- 21 October 2017 – 2017 Ayorou attack
- 10 December 2019 – Battle of Inates
- 9 January 2020 – Battle of Chinagodrar
- 9 May 2020 – May 2020 Tillabéri massacres
- 9 August 2020 – Kouré shooting
- 21 March 2021 – 2021 Tahoua attacks
- 2 November 2021 – 2021 Adab-Dab attack
- 2 October 2023 – 2023 Tabatol attack
- 21 March 2024 – On March 21, 2024, militants from the Islamic State – Sahil Province (ISGS) ambushed Nigerien soldiers between the towns of Teguey and Bankilare, Tillabéri Region, Niger killing at least 23 soldiers and wounding 23. The Nigerien army stated that a convoy of Nigerien troops were ambushed by jihadists in between the towns of Teguey and Bankilare during a combing operation in the area on March 21, 2024. In the statement, Nigerien officials said that over 100 fighters aboard motorcycles used IEDs and suicide bombers to ambush the soldiers. The ISGS claimed responsibility on March 23, claiming to have killed 30 soldiers and wounded dozens of others. The Nigerien junta also claimed that 30 jihadists were killed in the attack. The government of Niger declared three days of national mourning to honour the fallen soldiers. In the capital of Niger, Niamey, a ceremony was held for the soldiers' funeral.
- 21 March 2025 – Militants suspected from the Islamic State – Sahel Province attacked a mosque in Kokorou, killing at least 44 worshippers and injuring 13 others.
