= August 2023 Anzourou attacks =

- Part of Islamist insurgency in Niger
Date	August 20, 2023
Location	Doukou Saraou, Doukou Makani, Doukou Koirategui, Anzourou commune, Tillaberi Region, Niger
Result	ISSP victory

Belligerents
Niger: Defense and Security Forces	Islamic State – Sahel Province

Casualties and losses
12 killed (per Niger); 14 killed, 4 injured (per WAMaps)	Heavy

On 20 August 2023, militants from the Islamic State – Sahel Province (ISSP) attacked the villages of Doukou Saraou, Doukou Makani, and Doukou Koirategui, in Anzourou commune, Tillabéri Region, Niger, killing at least 12 soldiers. The attack came two days after the Koutougou attack that left 17 soldiers dead.

== Background ==
On 26 July 2023, disgruntled Nigerien officers led by Abdourahamane Tiani overthrew the democratically-elected government of Mohamed Bazoum, decrying him for not effectively combatting the jihadist insurgencies in the country by Jama'at Nasr al-Islam wal-Muslimin, Islamic State in the Greater Sahara, and Boko Haram. Analysts stated that the coup would allow jihadists to expand even more throughout the tri-border region between Mali, Niger, and Burkina Faso. One of the stated reasons for the coup was the multiple deadly attacks in recent weeks, including the massacre of twelve civilians near Anzourou by jihadists on July 22.

Following the coup, the Nigerien Army called a portion of its forces back to Niamey, amplifying the threat along the Malian border. Five civilians were killed on August 3 by jihadists in Anzourou, twelve civilians were killed on August 4 near Wabila and Hondobon, five Nigerien national guardsmen were killed on August 9 in Bourkou Boundou, and six national guardsmen were killed on August 13 in Sanam. On August 15, an ambush on Koutougou left 17 Nigerien soldiers dead and over 100 militants killed.

== Attack ==
The attacks took place in the villages of Doukou Saraou, Doukou Makani, and Doukou Koirategui, all southeast of Anzourou, on August 20. Nigerien officials said that soldiers of the Defense and Security Forces (FDS) conducting an "anti-jihadist operation" were ambushed by jihadists, killing twelve of them. The Nigerien government also said that high casualties were inflicted on the attackers. West Africa Maps, a consortium of West African journalists, said that 14 FDS soldiers were killed in the ambush and four were injured. WAMaps also said that the jihadists stole livestock, and the National Guard of Niger came to reinforce the FDS after the attack. Four Nigerien vehicles were abandoned on the retreat to Bonfeba.

== Claim ==
On August 25, the Islamic State's Sahel Province claimed responsibility for several attacks in Niger and Mali. While Anzourou was not mentioned, an attack on August 13 and an attack on August 20 were both claimed.
