= Djibo Bakary Bridge =

The Djibo Bakary Bridge is a road bridge over the Niger River in the Tillabéri region of Niger.

== Location and construction ==
The bridge crosses the Niger River about 46 kilometres northwest of the capital, Niamey. On the left bank is the hamlet of Bac Farié in the municipality of Kourteye, which belongs to the Tillabéri department. A little further east is the village of Sorbon Haoussa. On the right bank is the hamlet of Bossikoira in the municipality of Gothèye, which belongs to the department Gothèye.

The bridge has a total length of 640 metres and 16 spans of 40 meters each. On the left bank of the river runs a 1529-metre long access road to Nationalstraße 1 and on the right bank of the river a 1342-meter-long access road to the national road 4.

== History ==
At the site of the bridge, a ferry was previously operated, which was moved here in 1970 because of the construction of the Kennedy Bridge from the capital Niamey. Here, one of the nation's most important moorings for fishing on the Niger River developed.

On the initiative and in the presence of President Mahamadou Issoufou, on the 16th. May 2015 with the construction work on the bridge started. The manufacturing company was China's Geo-Engineering Corporation International (CGCINT). The construction costs amounted to 13 billion CFA francs and were financed by the African Development Bank. President Mahamadou Issoufou opened the Djibo-Bakary Bridge on 12. November 2020. It is named after the politician Djibo Bakary (1922–1998), an early advocate of Niger's independence from France.
