= Tondikandia =

- Commune
- Location in Niger
- Coordinates: 14°01′55″N 2°51′48″E
- Country: Niger
- Region: Tillabéri Region
- Department: Filingué Department
- Rural Commune: Tondikandia Commune

Population (2010)
  - Total: 111,459
- Time zone: UTC+1 (WAT)

Tondikandia is a rural commune in Filingué Department, Tillabéri Region, Niger. Its chief place and administrative center is the town of Damana.

== Geography ==
Tondikania, some 120 km northeast of the capital Niamey. It is centered in the large dry river valley of the Dallol Bosso, which runs south from Saharan Mali, joining the Niger River valley south of Niamey. Tondikania is bordered by Dingazi and Filingué to the northwest, Imanan and Kourfeye Centre to the northeast, Loga and Tagazar to the south, and Simiri to the east.

== History ==
Tondikania's name comes from the pre-colonial Zarma statelet of the same name, formed in the early 19th century. Oral tradition from the village of Shat, to the northeast of Tondikania, describes Zarma peoples moving into the area from the southwest at some earlier date, displacing the now smaller Sudye population, an amalgam of earlier populations who now share the Zarma language. The prefix "Tondi-", "Mountain" in Zarma, is shared with many localities in the area. Nomadic Fula (Fula: Fulɓe; French: Peul) moved in the Dallol Bosso in the 18th century, setting up small states and centers of Muslim learning along the Niger River valley to the south and west. Sometime around 1830 Kel Gres Tuareg moved into the northern part of Tondikania, resulting in a series of conflicts and its Zarma and Fula neighbors, but also settling a number of sedentary dependent communities (the "Bellah") in the area. Prior to French expansion into the Niger Valley in the late 1890s, Tondikania was united under the rule of the war leader Karanta. In 1901, the French installed an official chieftaincy of the "Canton of Tondikania", whose head answered to the French administration of the Colony of Niger. The General and President of Niger, Seyni Kountché (1931–1987) was born in the village of Fandou Béri, Tondikania. Kountché's family remains influential in the area, while the late president's brother was in 2009 the long serving and respected head of Tondikania civil administration.

== Population ==
While the Tondikania has been historically linked to the Zarma people, the commune also includes communities of Tuareg, Fulbe, and Hausa. In 2010, the government of Niger reported that the Commune of Tondikandia had 111,459 residents. A population of 84,223 was reported in 2001.

== Administration ==
Tondikania is a Rural Commune, which includes a number of smaller subdivisions, governed by elected and appointed officials at the Commune level, based from Damana. It is in turn governed by the Filingué Department, a subdivision of the Tillabéri Region. In 2010 the Commune governed 210 administrative "Localities", which included 118 villages, 89 towns and 3 traditional chieftaincies. The largest town and commune administrative seat (chef-lieu) is the town of Damana, with a reported 2010 population of 3500.

These localities (2010) are:

Agazol Fandou, Agazol Gorou, Alfa Kouara, Alfagaye, Alfari Kouara, Allabo (Allabo Koira Tegui), Alphagaye, Asko, Atchom, Atta Loga, Balle Kouara, Bambaka, Ban Kouara, Bangali, Bangou Banda Babitouri, Bangou Banda Gachi Kouara, Bangou Banda, Bangou Bi, Bangou Foumbo I, Bangou Foumbo (II), Bani Fandou, Banizoumbou (II), Banizoumbou (II), Banizoumbou, Banizounbou, Bardji Kouara, Birgui Kouara, Birki Kaina, Bomberi, Bongou Kouarey, Bosso, Boude, Bougara, Boukar Hima, Boukay Gorou, Bouki Bari, Boukou Zaweini Foulan, Boukou Zaweini, Boulkass, Bourgari, Bourtossi, Cahibou Kouara, Ciminti, Dagueye Deye, Damana Garia (I, II), Damana, Dani Fandou, Dankoukou, Darey Bery, Dey Tegui Fondabon, Dey Tegui Kouara, Deye Gorou, Deye Tegui, Deyguine, Dineyane, Dioula Kouara, Djiogo Kouara, Djole, Dolewa, El Kouara, Elh Fandobon Kouara, Elhadji Kouara, Fadi Foga, Fandoga, Fandoga, Fandou Beri, Fandou Mayaki, Fantou Yan, Fare, Faria Beri, Faria Goubey(Faria Maourey), Farmas Beri, Farmas Keina, Fazi Hinka, Fina Kouara, Folo, Foney Ganda, Foye Fandou, Gabda Fandou, Gabda Ganda, Gamsa Gorou, Ganda Bangou Alfaga Kouara, Ganda Bangou Simintodo, Gangamyan, Gani Damana, Garbey Taweye, Gatta Garbey Kouara Zeno, Gatta Gardey Kouara Tegui, Gatta Sogza Kouara, Gawaye, Gille Kouara (Hameau), Gonga, Gonga, Gorma Fando Bon, Gorma Moussa, Gorou Banda, Gorou, Goumbi Banda, Gounize, Guile Koira Tegui, Haini Si Morou Belle (I), Haini Si Morou Belle (II), Haini Si Morou Goubeye, Haini Si Morou Maourey, Hari Gana, Hassoumi Kouara, Kabey Kougou, Kandabata, Kandirkoye, Kandoum Ganda, Kandoum, Karaga Moumssou, Karim Bawa, Katamba Kaina, Kirip Beri, Kirip Kaina, Kobe, Koberi, Kobi Day, Kobi, Kobi, Kobi, Kobi, Kobi, Kofandou (Sixieme), Kofandou Talladje, Kofandou, Kogo, Kogorou Santche, Kokaina Kouara Tegui, Kokaina Kouara Zeno, Korgoni Zarma, Korombol, Kossey, Kouboutche, Koura, Kourega, Koussa, Koussou Fandou, Ladan Kouara, Lassour, Loguery, Loki Damana, Malam Oumarou Kouara, Manzaka, Maourey, Maridoumbo, Matchi Zaley (Sindbey), Mobangou, Moribene, Moufa Tombo, Naguiz Kouara Zeno, Naguize Dabaga, Naguize Tondi Sanda, Namari Bello, Namarou Bangou, Sabarey Kaina, Sabarey, Sakdamna, Samari Kouara, Samari Koura, Sansami, Sofani Djerma, Sofani Peulh (Korgom Foulan), Soley Damana, Soley Deye Djinde, Soley Deye Tegui, Soley Ganotondi, Soley Tanka, Soudje Mani Kouara, Soudjere, Soukoutou, Sourgo Kouara, Tadene Gao Beri, Tadene Kaina, Talibi Dey, Talifanta Beri, Talifanta Fandou Beri, Talifanta Goubey, Tamagueye, Tamara, Tanka Lamine, Tanka Lokoto, Tarifo, Tassi Kaina, Tchimori, Tebewa II, Tibawa I, Tiguiri Bellah (Tiguiri Zarma), Toka, Toke Yaw, Tolo Bango, Tombaize Kouara, Tombo, Tondi Banda, Tondi Banda, Tondi Banda, Tondi Banda, Tondikouara, Toutou Fandou, Wadouka Peulh, Wadouka Z (Va), Wahadi, Wandilan, Yaragaberi, Zaley Kouara, Zanagane Koiratagui, Zaza, Zebane Fitti, Zouragane Kouara Zeno.
