= Tillabéri Department =

Coordinates: 14°12′42″N 1°27′11″E

Tillabéri Tillabéry
- Department
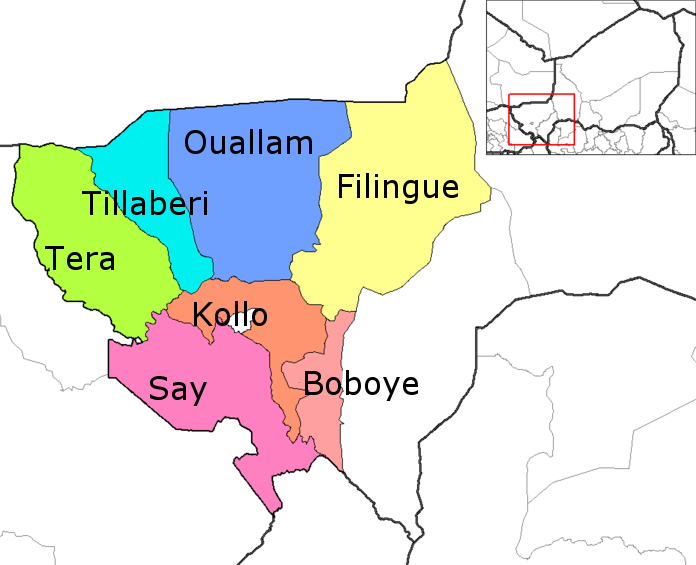
- Tillabéri Department location in the region
- Country: Niger
- Region: Tillabéri Region
- Departmental/Regional: Tillabéri

Area
  - Total: 5,136 km^{2} (1,983 sq mi)

Population (2012 census)
  - Total: 227,352
  - Density: 44.27/km^{2} (114.6/sq mi)
- Time zone: UTC+1 (GMT 1)

Tillabéri is a department of the Tillabéri Region in Niger. Its capital lies at the city of Tillabéri, and contains the Communes of Ayorou (as of 2001 the largest town in Department), Anzourou, Dessa, Kourteye, and Sinder. Tillabéri is also the capital of Tillabéri Region. The western border of the department is formed by the Niger River. As of 2012, the department had a total population of 227,352 people.

== Communes ==
- Anzourou
- Bibiyergou
- Dessa
- Kourteye
- Sakoira
- Sinder
- Tillabéri
