= 2020 Ayorou attack =

2020 battle between Niger and Islamic State

- Part of Jihadist insurgency in Niger
Date	March 12, 2020
Location	Ayorou, Tillaberi Region, Niger
Result	Franco-Nigerien victory

Belligerents
Niger: National Guard of Niger; France (aerial support)	Islamic State in the Greater Sahara

Casualties and losses
9 killed, 8 injured None	20+ killed

On March 12, 2020, Islamic State in the Greater Sahara militants attacked an outpost of the National Guard of Niger in Ayorou, Niger, killing several soldiers. French and Nigerien counterattacks killed dozens of ISGS militants.

== Background ==
Since the Islamic State in the Greater Sahara became an official province of the Islamic State in 2016, the insurgency between ISGS and the Nigerien government has polarized communities in western Niger's Tillabéri Region. The ISGS, predominantly composed of Fulani fighters, attacked Daoussahak Tuareg villages, prompting Daoussahak and other ethnic minorities in the region to ally themselves with the Mali-based GATIA and Movement for the Salvation of Azawad, themselves allied with the French Operation Barkhane.

Ayorou is located close to the Malian town of Labbézanga and the refugee camp of Tabareybarey, and as such has suffered several attacks from jihadists in ISGS crossing from Mali into Niger and vice versa. In 2017, two attacks took place against Nigerien forces in Ayorou, one of which sparking a battle that killed thirteen Nigerien soldiers.

== Attack ==
ISGS militants attacked the Nigerien National Guard outpost in Ayorou, and the Nigerien forces quickly alerted French and Nigerien officials. French forces sent out Mirage 2000 jets and MQ-9 drones, who spotted and targeted the jihadists. Two aerial strikes hit the jihadist group. Security sources told Anadolu Agency and AFP that nine Nigerien soldiers were killed and eight others were wounded in the attack. The French Army stated that over twenty jihadists were killed along with their motorcycles. AFP corroborated this, and attested that all of the jihadist attackers were killed.

ISGS claimed responsibility for the attack on March 14.

== See Also ==
- 2017 Ayorou attack
- Islamist insurgency in Niger
