= Sanam ambush =

- Part of Jihadist insurgency in Niger
Date	December 25, 2019
Location	Sanam, Tillaberi Region, Niger
Result	ISGS victory

Belligerents
Niger	Islamic State in the Greater Sahara

Casualties and losses
16 killed 4 injured 1 missing	none

On December 25, 2019, Islamic State in the Greater Sahara (ISGS) militants attacked Nigerien forces in Sanam, Tillabéri Region, Niger.

== Background ==
Since the Islamic State in the Greater Sahara became an official province of the Islamic State in 2016, the insurgency between ISGS and the Nigerien government has polarized communities in western Niger's Tillabéri Region. The ISGS, predominantly composed of Fulani fighters, attacked Daoussahak Tuareg villages, prompting Daoussahak and other ethnic minorities in the region to ally themselves with the Mali-based GATIA and Movement for the Salvation of Azawad, themselves allied with the French Operation Barkhane.

== Ambush ==
At the time of the attack, the Nigerien soldiers were escorting electoral officials who had been helping residents register to vote when they were ambushed by ISGS fighters. The Nigerien Ministry of Defense released scant details about the ambush, but in their statement mentioned that seven gendarmes and seven national guardsmen were killed "at the end of a fierce battle." Several people were injured and one was reported missing as well. By December 30, the death toll had risen to 16 killed, four injured, and one missing. The Nigerien Ministry of Defense also stated that several ISGS jihadists were killed as well, but did not release a number. They also reported that Sanam remained under the control of Nigerien forces. ISGS claimed responsibility through ISWAP on January 14, 2020.
