= July 2019 Inates attack =

- Part of Jihadist insurgency in Niger
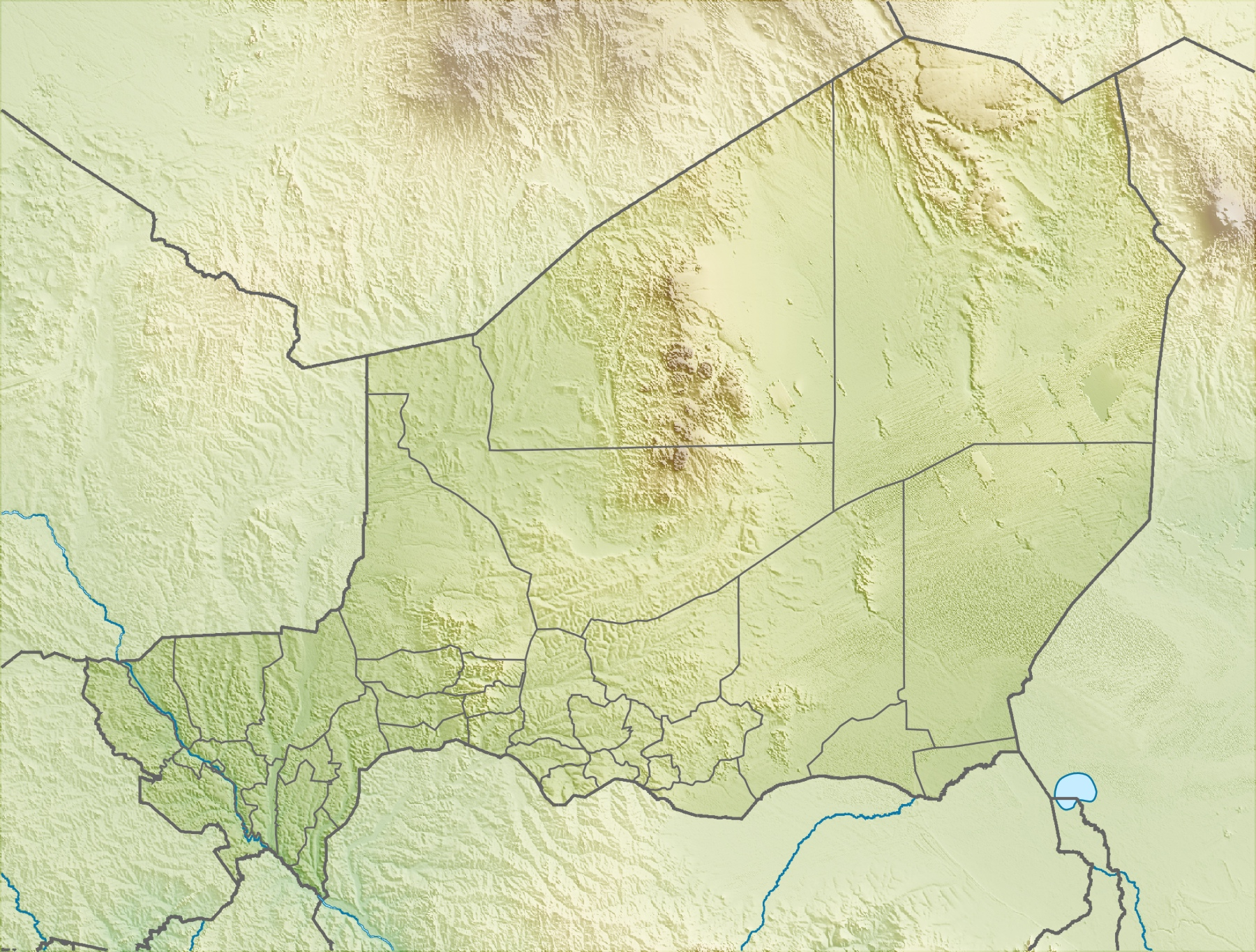
- July 2019 Inates attack (Niger)
Date	July 1, 2019
Location	Inates, Tillaberi Region, Niger
Result	ISGS victory

Belligerents
Niger; France; United States	Islamic State in the Greater Sahara

Casualties and losses
18 killed, 4 missing None	2+ killed

On July 1, 2019 Islamic State in the Greater Sahara militants attacked the mining town of Inates, Tillabéri Region, Niger, killing eighteen Nigerien soldiers.

== Background ==
Since the Islamic State in the Greater Sahara became an official province of the Islamic State in 2016, the insurgency between ISGS and the Nigerien government has polarized communities in western Niger's Tillabéri Region. The ISGS, predominantly composed of Fulani fighters, attacked Daoussahak Tuareg villages, prompting Daoussahak and other ethnic minorities in the region to ally themselves with the Mali-based GATIA and Movement for the Salvation of Azawad, themselves allied with the French Operation Barkhane. The alliance temporarily ended ISGS massacres in the area surrounding Inates, although reprisal massacres against Fulani by the Daoussahak and other minorities led many Fulani to join ISGS.

== Attack ==
The attack began at 2:30 p.m. when ISGS assaulted a Nigerien military post on the outskirts of the town of Inates with two suicide bombers. The explosion partially torched the barracks, and more ISGS fighters on motorcycles arrived and began shooting at the soldiers. Nigerien soldiers in the area sounded the alarm, and two French and American jets flew over the area from Niamey shortly after. The Nigerien Ministry of Defense stated that the attack was repelled thanks to the air support. The ISGS fighters retreated into Mali, and cleanup operations were launched.

== Aftermath ==
The Nigerien Ministry of Defense announced on July 2 that at least eighteen Nigerien soldiers were killed including officer Lt. A. Wahab Aboubacar. Four other soldiers were missing as well. The allied airstrikes destroyed an ISGS truck and killed several fighters as well. The victims of the attack were buried on July 2 in Tillabéri. Another Nigerien security source stated that ten Nigerien vehicles were captured by ISGS, and nine others were set on fire.

The Islamic State – West Africa Province (ISWAP), of which ISGS is a part of, claimed responsibility for the attack and stated they killed dozens of Nigerien soldiers and captured several vehicles. In their statement, they claimed only two of their suicide bombers were killed and that the rest of the fighters were alive.

On July 15, a Tuareg leader named Almoubacher Ag Alamjadi was assassinated by ISGS in Inates, two and a half months after the murder of his father. In September 2019, the Nigerien government accused members of the High Council for the Unity of Azawad (HCUA) in complicity with the ISGS. An official Nigerien document stated that equipment taken by ISGS from the attack was transported to Tin Fadimata in the Ménaka Region of Mali by HCUA members. The HCUA denied these accusations.
