= 2020 Tillabéri attack =

2020 Tillabéri attack may refer to:

- Battle of Chinagodrar in January
- May 2020 Tillabéri attacks
- Kouré shooting in August
