= Torodi Department =

Torodi
- Department
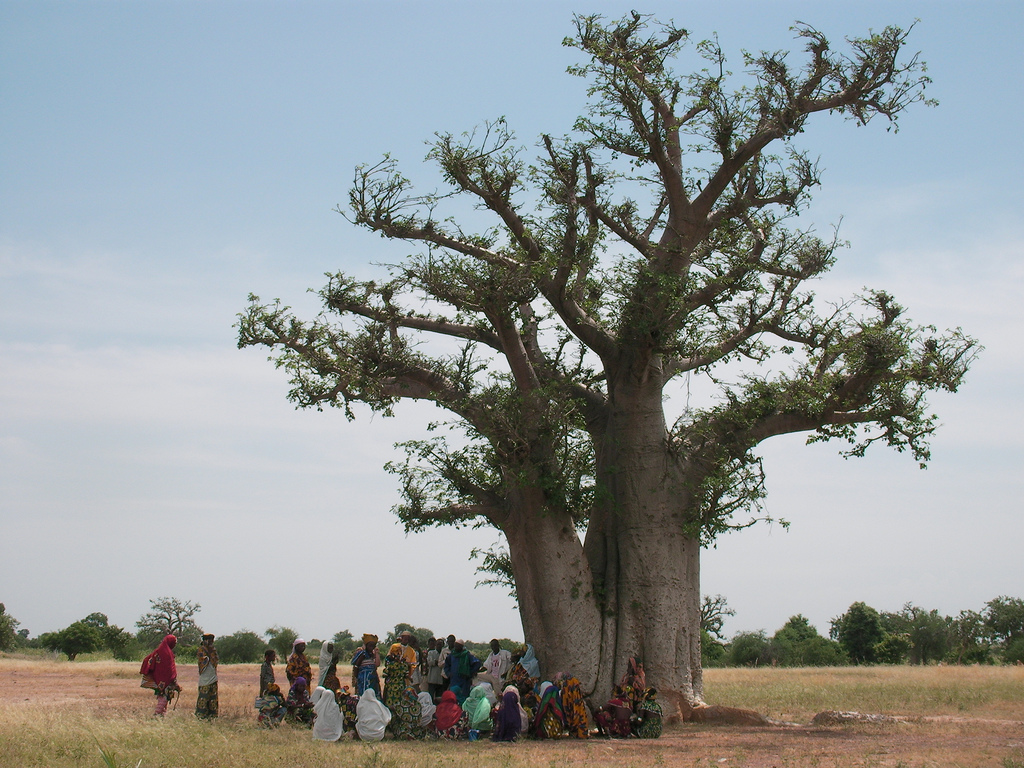
- Landscape
- Interactive map of Torodi
- Country: Niger
- Region: Tillabéri Region

Area
  - Total: 2,652 sq mi (6,869 km^{2})

Population (2012)
  - Total: 182,613
  - Density: 68.86/sq mi (26.59/km^{2})
- Time zone: UTC+1 (GMT 1)

Torodi is a department of the Tillabéri Region in Niger. Its administrative seat is the city of Torodi. As of 2012, the department had a total population of 182,613 people.

== History ==
The department goes back to the administrative post (poste administratif) of Torodi, which was established in 1971. In 2011, the administrative post was separated from the department of Say and elevated to the department of Torodi.

== Municipalities ==
Torodi Department is divided into two municipalities:

- Makalondi
- Torodi
