= Abala Department =

Abala
- Department
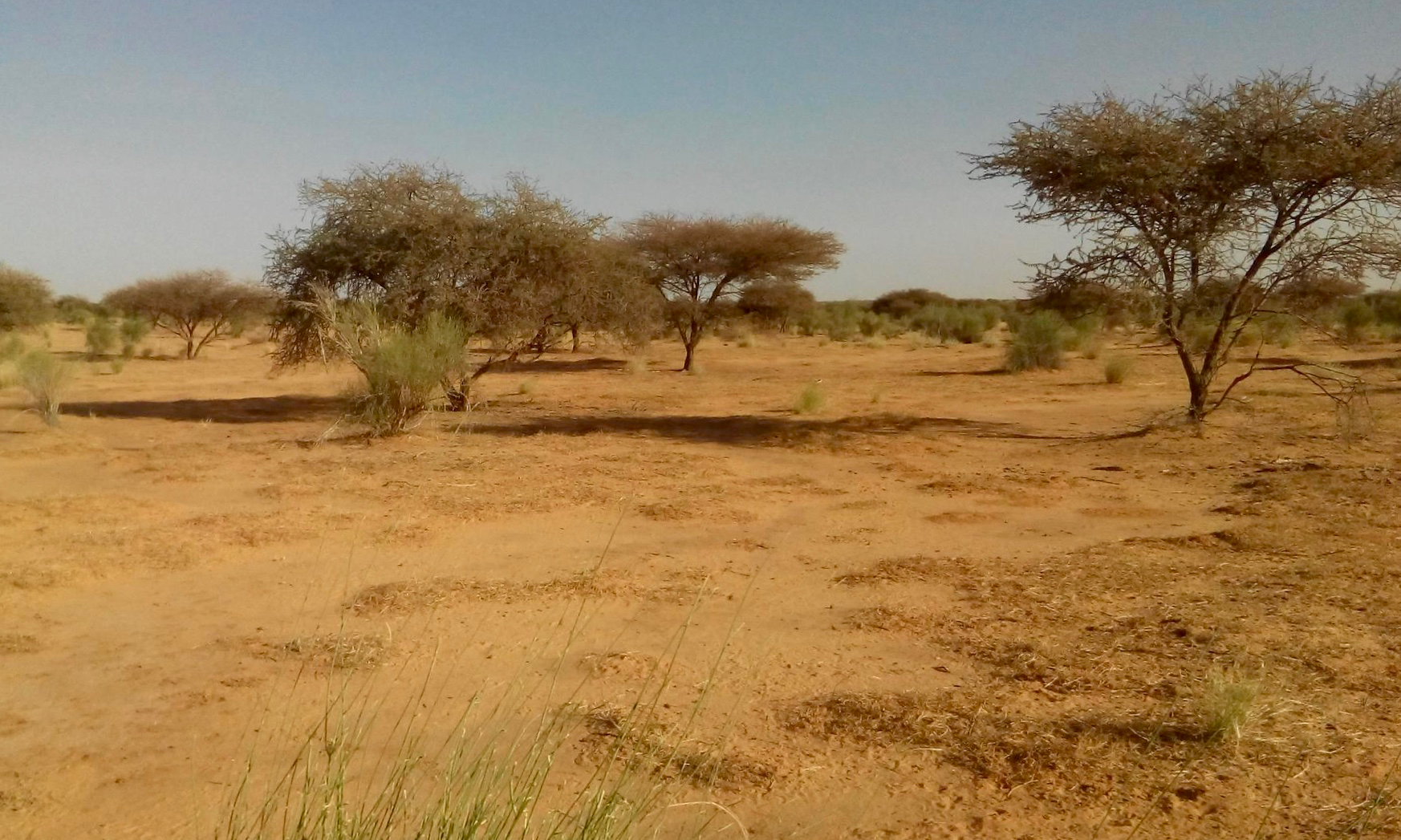
- Landscape
- Interactive map of Abala
- Coordinates: 14°55′50″N 3°26′00″E
- Country: Niger
- Region: Tillabéri Region

Area
  - Total: 4,780 sq mi (12,390 km^{2})

Population (2012)
  - Total: 144,287
  - Density: 30.16/sq mi (11.65/km^{2})
- Time zone: UTC+1 (GMT 1)

Abala is a department of the Tillabéri Region in Niger. The department is located in the south-west of the country and borders Mali. Its administrative seat is the city of Abala. As of 2012, the department had a total population of 144,287 people.

== History ==
The department goes back to the administrative post (poste administratif) of Abala, which was established in 1964. In 2011, the administrative post was separated from the department of Filingué and elevated to the department of Abala. As a result of the conflict in northern Mali, the government of Niger declared a state of emergency in the department of Abala and six other departments in March 2017, which was subsequently extended several times.

== Municipalities ==
Abala Department is divided into two municipalities, listed with population as of 2012 census:

- Abala (75,821)
- Sanam (68,466)
