= Dagne ambush =

- Part of Islamist insurgency in Niger
Date	November 5, 2021
Location	near Dagne, Tillaberi Region, Niger
Result	Nigerien victory

Belligerents
Niger	Islamic State in the Greater Sahara

Casualties and losses
11-14 killed 9 missing 1 injured	Unknown

On November 5, 2021, militants from the Islamic State in the Greater Sahara attacked Nigerien soldiers near Dagne, Anzourou commune, Tillabéri Region, Niger, killing at least eleven soldiers and leaving nine more missing.

== Background ==
Following widespread massacres in the first half of 2021 against non-Fulani ethnic groups and villages that support the Nigerien government or Jama'at Nasr al-Islam wal-Muslimin by the predominantly-Fulani Islamic State in the Greater Sahara (ISGS), various non-Fulani areas formed self-defense militias in Tillabéri Region and Tahoua Region to prevent future attacks by ISGS. To counter these attacks, ISGS pushed further into Tahoua Region to attack Nigerien soldiers. In March 2021, ISGS massacres against civilians in Tillia killed over 140 civilians and sparked the creation of self-defense militias in the area.

On November 2, 2021, three days before the Dagne ambush, ISGS militants killed over 69 militiamen and civilians at Adab-Dab, near Banibangou.

== Ambush ==
Several dozen militants on motorcycles and cars entered the town of Dagne on November 5, immediately clashing with the Nigerien troops stationed just outside the town. The soldiers had been deployed around Dagne after the Adab-Dab attack to protect civilians in the area. Nigerien officials said that the attack was repulsed, and that eleven soldiers had been killed, nine were missing, and one was injured. International Crisis Group later reported that 14 soldiers had been killed in the attack. Nigerien officials said that the ISGS militants had suffered casualties as well, and retreated with the bodies of their dead and wounded.
