= Balléyara Department =

Balléyara
- Department
- Interactive map of Balléyara
- Coordinates: 13.78389°N 2.95194°E
- Country: Niger
- Region: Tillabéri Region

Area
  - Total: 540 sq mi (1,399 km^{2})

Population (2012)
  - Total: 107,134
  - Density: 198.3/sq mi (76.58/km^{2})
- Time zone: UTC+1 (GMT 1)

Balléyara is a department of the Tillabéri Region in Niger. Its administrative seat is the city of Tagazar. As of 2012, the department had a total population of 107,134 people.

== History ==
The department goes back to the administrative post (poste administratif) of Balleyara, which was established in 1971. In 2011, the administrative post was separated from the department of Filingué and elevated to the department of Balleyara.

== Municipalities ==
Balléyara Department is divided into one municipality, listed with population as of 2012 census:

- Tagazar (107,134)
