= 2023 Koutougou attack =

Koutougou attack
- Part of Jihadist insurgency in Niger
Date	August 15, 2023
Location	Koutougou, Niger
Result	Indecisive

Belligerents
Niger	Jama'at Nasr al-Islam wal Muslimin

Casualties and losses
17+ killed 20 injured	~100 killed (per Niger); 50 motorcycles destroyed

On August 15, 2023, jihadists from Jama'at Nasr al-Islam wal-Muslimin (JNIM) ambushed Nigerien soldiers near Koutougou, a village on the border between Niger and Mali. The ambush killed at least seventeen Nigerien soldiers, and was the first major attack by a jihadist group on Nigerien forces since the 2023 Nigerien coup d'état.

== Background ==
On July 26, 2023, disgruntled Nigerien officers led by Abdourahamane Tiani overthrew the democratically-elected government of Mohamed Bazoum, decrying him for not effectively combatting the jihadist insurgencies in the country by Jama'at Nasr al-Islam wal-Muslimin, Islamic State in the Greater Sahara, and Boko Haram. Analysts stated that the coup would allow jihadists to expand even more throughout the tri-border region between Mali, Niger, and Burkina Faso.

Following the coup, the Nigerien Army called a portion of its forces back to Niamey, amplifying the threat along the Malian border. Five civilians were killed on August 3 by jihadists in Anzourou, twelve civilians were killed on August 4 near Wabila and Hondobon, five Nigerien national guardsmen were killed on August 9 in Bourkou Boundou, and six national guardsmen were killed on August 13 in Sanam.

== Attack ==
The Nigerien Ministry of Defense published the news of the attack on August 16, stated that a convoy of Nigerien forces moving between Boni and Torodi was ambushed by a group of jihadists, killing seventeen soldiers and injuring twenty others. The injured soldiers were taken to hospitals in Niamey for treatment. In the statement, Nigerien officials claimed that over 100 jihadists and 50 motorcycles were killed in reprisal operations.

JNIM claimed responsibility for the ambush on August 18, also corroborating the death toll of seventeen soldiers. JNIM did not publish a toll of their casualties, although they did state they captured a drone and a mortar.
