= Abala, Niger =

Abala
- Commune and village
- Location within Niger
- Coordinates: 14°56′13″N 3°26′01″E
- Country: Niger
- Region: Tillabéri Region
- Department: Filingué Department
- Elevation: 738 ft (225 m)

Population (2010)
  - Total: 75,117
- Time zone: UTC+1 (WAT)

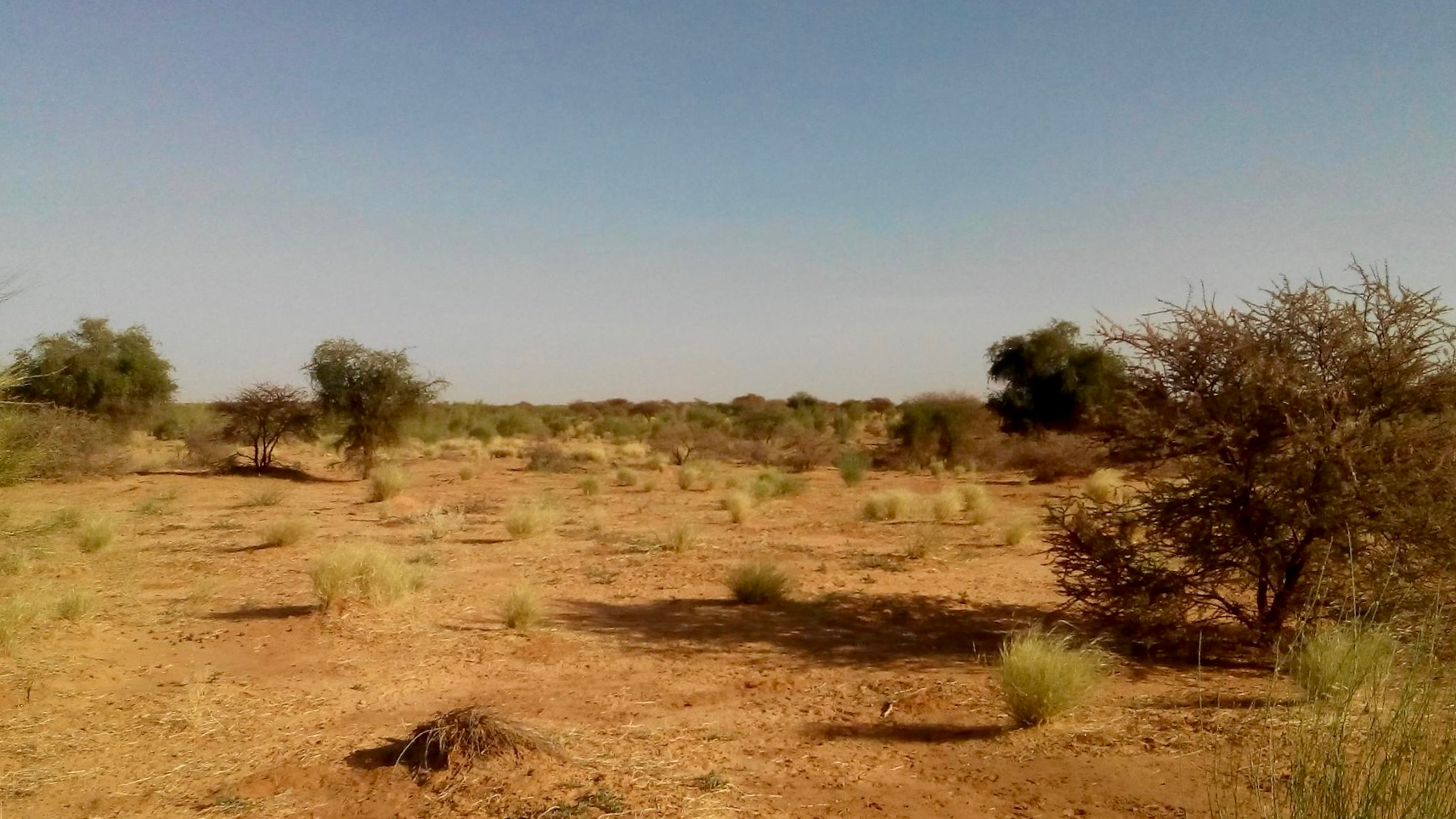
Abala, Niger

Abala, Niger is a village and rural commune in Niger.

== Geography ==
Abala lies in the Sahel in the Dallol Bosso and borders on the neighbouring state of Mali. The nearest communities in Niger are Tillia to the east, Sanam in the southeast, Kourfeye Centre in the south, Filingué the southwest and Banibangou in the west. The municipality comprises 45 administrative villages, 32 traditional villages, 72 hamlets, four camps and five water bodies. The capital of the rural community is Abala consisting of the administrative villages Abala Arabe I, Abala Arabe II, Abala Guirnazan, Abala Maidagi, Abala Moulela and Abala Toudou.

== History ==
In 1964 Abala received the status of an administrative post (French: poste administratif). In 2002, the City Centre and Kourfeye Sanam were released from the Canton Kourfey and independent rural community. In 2009 there were floods in many villages of the municipality, in which 7,210 residents were directly affected by property damage.

== Population ==
In the 2001 census there were 56,803 inhabitants of Abala. For 2010 75,177 inhabitants were estimated. Approximately 80% of the population of Abala in 2011 were classified in a study of the French NGO ACTED as poor or very poor. More than 81% of the local population had no access to latrines.

== Economy and infrastructure ==
The community is located at the transition zone between the pastoral agriculture of the South Zone and the pure agriculture of the North. There is also a community market garden powered by solar panels where different food crops are grown. National Highway 25 connects the village to the neighbouring communities Filingué and Sanam.
