= Ayourou Department =

Ayourou Ayérou
- Department
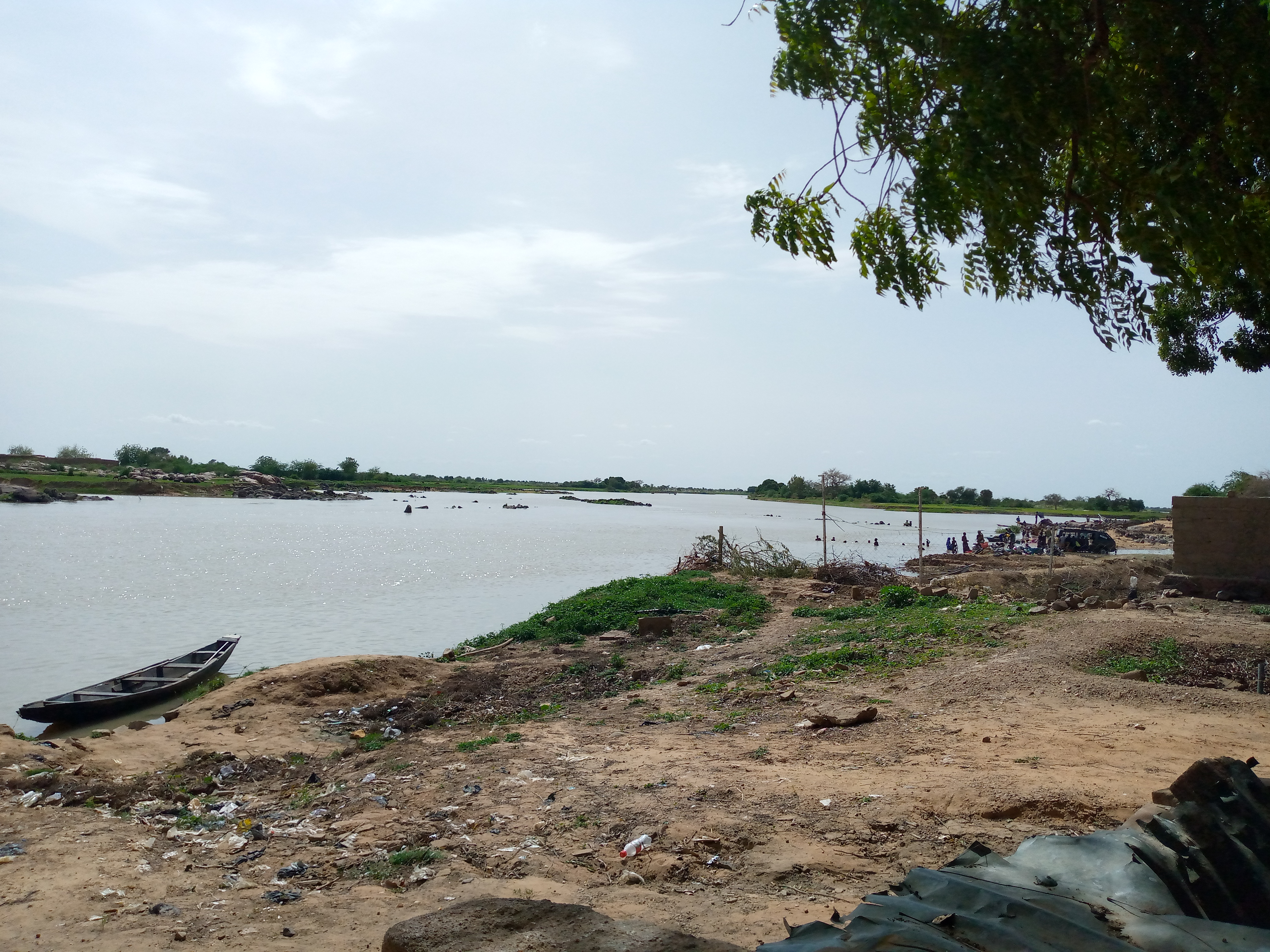
- Niger river in Ayourou Department

- Location in Niger
- Coordinates: 14°43′51″N 0°55′01″E
- Country: Niger
- Region: Tillabéri Region

Area
  - Total: 1,173 sq mi (3,037 km^{2})

Population (2012)
  - Total: 57,030
  - Density: 48.64/sq mi (18.78/km^{2})
- Time zone: UTC+1 (GMT 1)

Ayourou is a department of the Tillabéri Region in Niger. The department is located in the south-west of the country and borders Mali. Its administrative seat is the city of Ayourou. As of 2012, the department had a total population of 57,030 people.

== History ==
The department goes back to the administrative post (poste administratif) of Ayourou, which was established in 1964. In 2011, the administrative post was separated from the department of Tillabéri and elevated to the department of Ayourou. As a result of the conflict in northern Mali, the government of Niger declared a state of emergency in the department of Ayourou and six other departments in March 2017, which was subsequently extended several times.

== Municipalities ==
Ayourou Department is divided into two municipalities, listed with population as of 2012 census:

- Ayourou (33,527)
- Inates (23,503)
