= Mehana =

Rural commune in Niger

Coordinates: 14°23′43″N 1°07′50″E

- Commune and village
- Interactive map of Mehana
- Country: Niger
- Region: Tillabéri

Area
  - Total: 158.9 sq mi (411.5 km^{2})

Population (2012 census)
  - Total: 40,593
  - Density: 255.5/sq mi (98.65/km^{2})
- Time zone: UTC+1 (WAT)

Mehana is a town and commune in Niger. As of 2012, it had a population of 40,593.
