= Mahamane Laouali Dan-Dah =

Nigerien lawyer and politician

Minister of Justice and Human Rights
- In office 16 April 1999 – 5 January 2000

Personal details
- Born: 1966 (age 59–60)
- Education: University of Niamey
- Profession: Lawyer, Politician

Mahamane Laouali Dan-Dah (born 1966) is a Nigerien lawyer and politician.

== Early life and education ==
Mahamane studied at the University of Niamey, where he graduated with a Maîtrise in Law in 1989. He then attended the École nationale de la magistrature in France, where he obtained a diploma as a judge and public prosecutor in 1992.

== Career ==
From 1992 to 1997, Dan-Dah worked as a deputy public prosecutor at the Niamey Tribunal. During this time, he was also responsible for the direction of the judicial police. From 1994, he also worked as a lecturer at the University of Niamey. In 1995, he was a member of a government commission responsible for the inspection of public administration and state and quasi-state enterprises. From 1997 to 1998, he served as a judge for civil, commercial, and customary law cases in the commune of Niamey III. He also served as Secretary General of the Autonomous Union of Judges and Public Prosecutors of Niger, which he represented in international bodies. From August 1998 to April 1999, Dan-Dah served as President of the Independent National Electoral Commission (CENI).

He was appointed Minister of Justice and Human Rights in the government of the interim head of state Daouda Malam Wanké on 16 April 1999. Dan-Dah held this position until 5 January 2000, when he was replaced by Ali Sirfi in the new government of head of state Mamadou Tandja.

Laouali was appointed Minister of Secondary, Higher Education and Scientific Research from 2010 to 2011.
