= Sinegodar =

- Village
- Interactive map of Sinegodar
- Country: Niger
- Region: Tillabéri
- Time zone: UTC+1 (WAT)

Sinegodar is a village in the Tillabéri Region, Niger. It is located near the border with Mali.

The village is a four-hour drive from Niamey, the capital of the country. As of February 2012, due to the Northern Mali conflict, 7000 people, after crossing the border, have settled in a refugee camp, where until recently only 1500 people lived.
