= Ali Sirfi =

Nigerien Lawyer and Politician

Médiateur de la RépubliqueOmbudsman of the Republic
- In office 2016–2022
- Preceded by: Amadou Cheiffou
- Succeeded by: Assimiou Diabiri

Minister of Justice and Relations with Parliament
- In office 2000–2001
- Prime Minister: Hama Amadou

Personal details
- Born: 1 January 1955 (age 71) Dessa, Niger
- Spouse: Married
- Children: 5
- Education: University of Abidjan
- Occupation: Lawyer, Politician
- Known for: Political service in Niger

Ali Sirfi (born 1 January 1955 in Dessa) is a Nigerien lawyer and politician.

== Life ==
Ali Sirfi studied law at the University of Abidjan, where he obtained a Licence en droit in 1981 and a Maîtrise en droit in 1982. He then attended the bar school in Rouen in France from 1982 to 1984. He took his oath of office before the Niger Bar in 1985, where he subsequently held senior positions, including Secretary General. Sirfi was the Bar's representative at the 1991 National Conference, which coordinated Niger's transition to a multi-party system. From 1993 to 1995 he was President of the Union of Young Lawyers of Niger.

Sirfi was elected to the National Assembly as an independent in the 1996 Niger parliamentary elections. He served as a member of the parliamentary committees on general and institutional affairs and on economic affairs and planning. He was also a representative for Niger in the parliament of the West African Economic and Monetary Union. Ali Sirfi served under President Mamadou Tandja and Prime Minister Hama Amadou from 2000 to 2001 as Minister of Justice and Relations with Parliament. In 2010 he became President of the Niger Bar Association. In 2016 he was appointed Médiateur de la République (roughly: Ombudsman of the Republic) succeeding Amadou Cheiffou. He was succeeded in this position by Assimiou Diabiri in 2022.

Ali Sirfi is married and father of five children.

== Honors ==
- Commander of the National Order of Niger
