= Battle of Chinagodrar =

2020 Nigerien insurgency conflict

- Part of the War in the Sahel and the Islamist insurgency in Niger
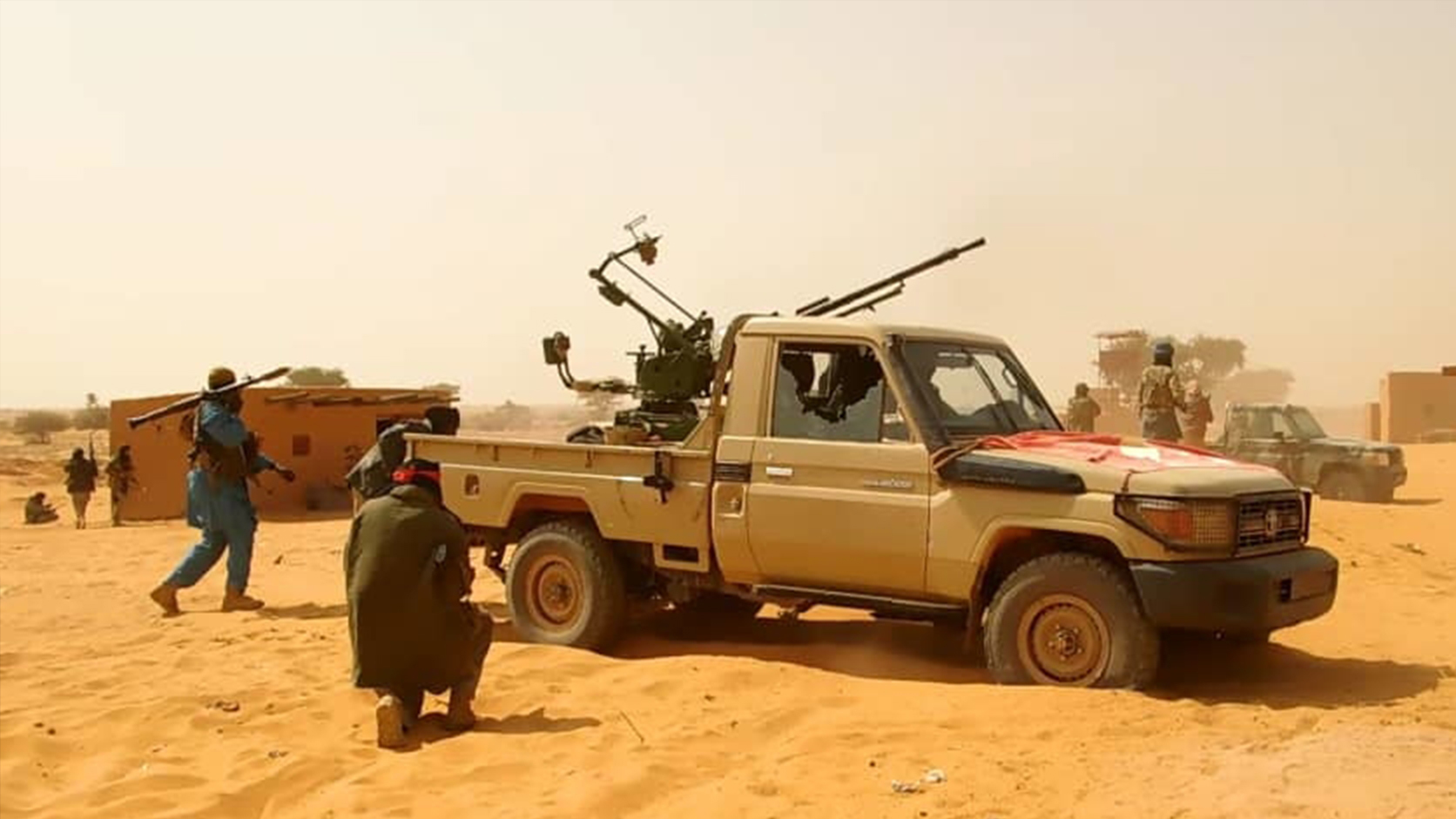
- IS-GS militants in the Chinagodar camp
Date	9 January 2020
Location	Chinagodrar, Filingue Department, Tillabéri Region, Niger
Result	Islamic State (ISIS) victory

Belligerents
Niger; France; United States	Islamic State in the Greater Sahara

Casualties and losses
(Niger) 89+ killed, 6 injured	(Islamic State) 7 killed

On 9 January 2020, a large group of Islamic State in the Greater Sahara militants assaulted a Nigerien military base at Chinagodrar, in Niger's Tillabéri Region. They attacked an army post in Chinagodrar, in the west of the country, in Tillabéri Region, 13 kilometres (8 miles) from the border with Mali, 210 kilometres (130 miles) north of Niamey. At least 89 Nigerien soldiers were confirmed to have been killed in the attack, with more casualties suspected, making it the worst attack on the army since the start of the insurgency. The Nigerien government said that 77 militants were killed.

== Background ==
Since 2015 Niger has suffered from a Jihadist insurgency in the western part of the country from militants based in neighbouring Mali. This attack followed those in Niger on 10 and 25 December 2019.

== Attack ==
The attack on the army post by the Islamic State in the Greater Sahara (IS-GS) militants was launched from two directions. In the west, several heavily armed vehicles came from Akabar, Mali, while in the east, men riding several dozen motorcycles came from the Ikrafane forest in Niger. Prior to the attack, the IS-GS militants had rendered the GSM network inoperative after shelling the village of Dareydey. Despite the communication setback, Nigerien soldiers were able to contact air support through radio which came 20 minutes later in the form of a French Mirage 2000D that routed the IS-GS militants in a show of force. Following this, American reaper drones executed two strikes on the retreating militants.

The attack left at least 89 Nigerien soldiers dead and possibly more as some were buried immediately after the attack in Chinagodrar. 7 IS-GS militants were also killed.

== Aftermath ==
The Nigerien government declared three days of national mourning after the battle. Nigerien President Mahamadou Issoufou fired General Ahmed Mohamed, the chief of the Nigerien Army, and replaced him with Major General Salifou Modi.

Several hundred inhabitants of Chinagodrar, mainly former Malian refugees from the 2012 rebellion, fled the region and took refuge in Andéramboukane, Mali.
