= Makalondi =

Commune in Torodi, Niger

Coordinates: 12°50′10″N 1°41′20″E

- Commune
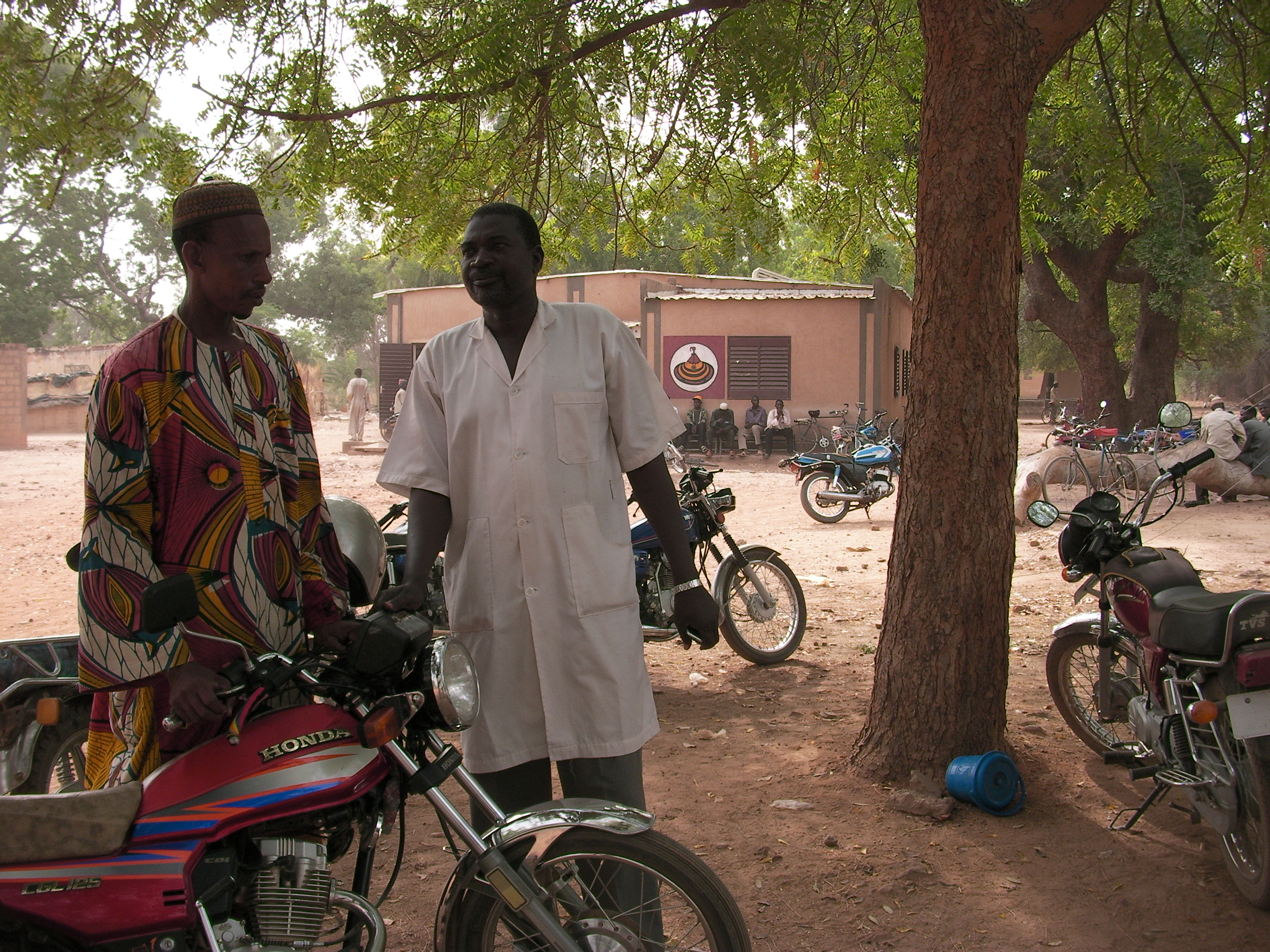
- Health Center in Makalondi
- Interactive map of Makalondi

Area
  - Total: 1,226 km^{2} (473 sq mi)

Population
  - Total: 73,271

Makalondi is a rural commune in the Torodi department of Niger. As of 2012, it had a population of 73,271.

== Geography ==
Makalondi is located in the Sahel. It borders Burkina Faso in the south and west.

=== Flora and fauna ===
On the higher plains of Makalondi, for which tiger bush is typical as a vegetation form, grow winged seed plants, acacias, monkey bread trees, doum palms and caritat trees. Khaya senegalensis and Tamarind thrive in the lowlands. The average rainfall level between 1961 and 1990 was about 600 mm (23 in). The Makalondi District is recognized as an Important Bird Area. The major birds include the Long-tailed glossy starling and the Savile's bustard. The birds were studied mainly by Pierre Souvairan, who lived in the area for 30 years between 1968 and 1998. Until the 1970s, large mammals, including Loxodonta africana, Panthera leo and Syncerus caffer were common, particularly in the western part of the area. Most disappeared following extensive clearance of land for agriculture during the 1980s.

== History ==
Makalondi was separated from the territory of the rural community of Torodi on 18 August 2009 as a separate commune. The reasons for the separation of Torodi included the high population density in this area and in particular the position of Makalondi as an important border town. Since 2011, Makalondi has not belonged to the Say department, but to the newly founded department of Torodi.

On 4 February 2026, JNIM militants overran a Nigerien military position in the, killing at least 36 soldiers and injuring several others.

== Population ==
Makalondi had 73,271 inhabitants as of the 2012 census, which lived in 8975 households.

== Culture ==
In Makalondi there are two Roman Catholic parishes belonging to the Archdiocese of Niamey: the parish of St. Francis in the main town, founded in 1967, and the parish of St. Spirit in the village of Bomanga (Bomoanga), founded in 1994. Its members are mainly members of the Gurma people ethnic group.
