= 2017 Ayorou attack =

Battle in Niger

- Part of Jihadist insurgency in Niger
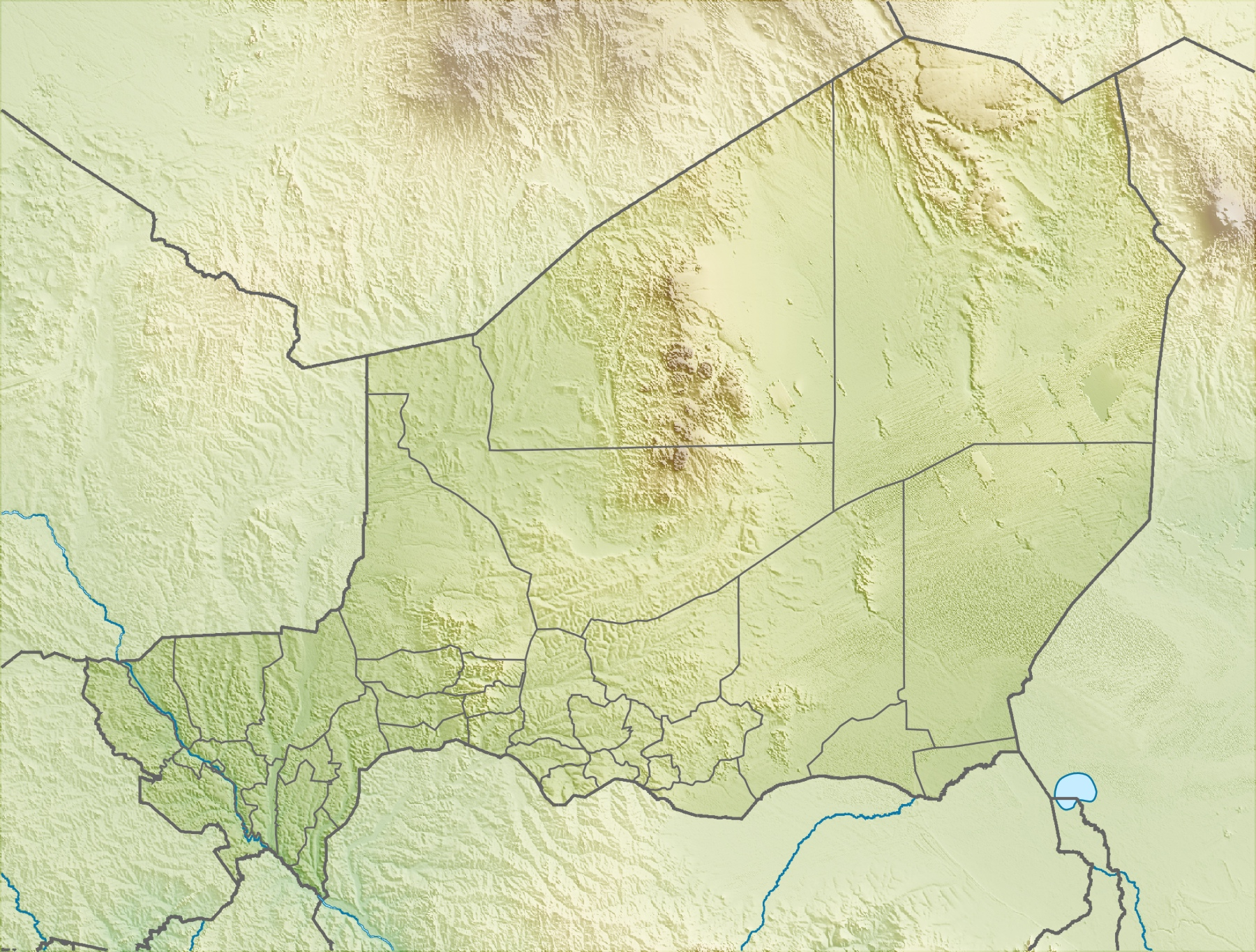
- 2017 Ayorou attack (Niger)
Date	October 21, 2017
Location	Ayorou, Tillaberi Region, Niger
Result	ISGS victory

Belligerents
Niger	Islamic State in the Greater Sahara

Casualties and losses
13 killed 5 injured 3 vehicles captured	3+ killed 1 vehicle destroyed

The 2017 Ayorou attack occurred on 21 October 2017 when armed militants from the Islamic State in the Greater Sahara attacked a Nigerien military outpost in the village of Ayorou in southwestern Niger, killing 13 gendarmes. Occurring just weeks after a similar attack in the area killed four American and four Nigerien troops, the attack was carried out by ISGS gunmen who crossed the porous border from Mali.

== Background ==
The town of Ayorou, located four kilometers from the Malian refugee camp of Tabareybarey and twenty-five kilometers from the Malian border town of Labbezanga. Jihadists had attacked Ayorou on May 11, 2017, with the jihadists seizing weapons and ammunition. No casualties were reported in the May attack, but the Nigerien gendarmerie post in Ayorou was left without defensive walls afterward, and the gendarmes only had trenches to defend themselves.

In early October 2017, Nigerien and American forces were killed by an ISGS ambush in Tongo Tongo, also in Tillabéri Region.

== Attack ==
At dawn on October 21, militants in four to five vehicles and motorcycles and armed with machine guns and rocket launchers attacked the gendarmes in Ayorou. The jihadists entered Ayorou from the east, and looted the gendarme's armory stealing weapons and three vehicles. Nigerien paratroopers from the nearby Yassen camp then arrived as reinforcements, and chased the jihadists when they fled Ayorou. Some of the militants were intersected north of the town, near Inates and in Malian territory, after a Nigerien patrol killed several jihadists and destroyed their vehicle. Nigerien planes surveilled the area, and cleanup operations were launched. The air force had spotted some of the jihadists in a Malian village during the clean-up operations, but the attackers escaped.

== Aftermath ==
Thirteen gendarmes were killed and five others were wounded, according to the Nigerien Ministry of Defense spokesman Samba Gagara. Residents of Ayorou testified that the jihadists fled the town carrying bodies of their comrades, and at least three were left behind. The Islamic State in the Greater Sahara claimed responsibility for the attack on January 12, 2018.

In a statement released by the U.S. embassy, the United States strongly condemned the attack and offered condolences to the families of the victims.

== See also ==
- Tongo Tongo ambush
