= Battle of Inates =

2019 battle in Niger

- Part of the Islamist insurgency in Niger
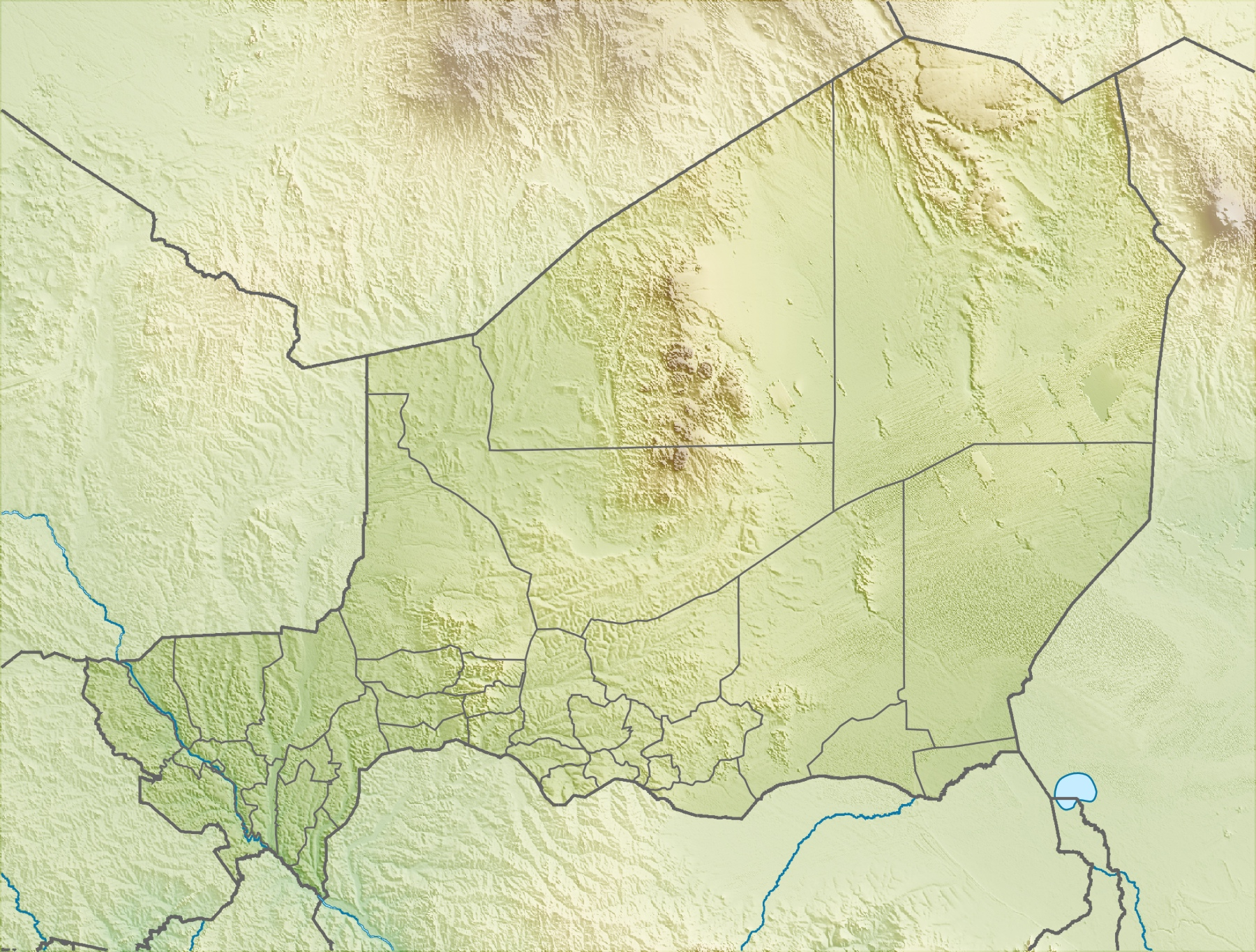
- Battle of Inates (Niger)
Date	10 December 2019
Location	Inates, Tillabéri Region, Niger 15°14′N 1°19′E
Result	ISGS victory

Belligerents
Niger	Islamic State in the Greater Sahara

Strength
220	150

Casualties and losses
73 killed 12 wounded	Light

On 10 December 2019, a large group of fighters belonging to the Islamic State in the Greater Sahara attacked a military post in Inates, Tillabéri Region, Niger. They used guns, bombs, and mortars killing over seventy soldiers and kidnapping others in one of the worst attacks in the history of Niger.

== Background ==
In the preceding months, attacks by the Islamic State in Mali, Burkina Faso and Niger have worsened with large scale firearm assaults on both the civilian population and armed forces. In November, gunmen killed over 50 soldiers in the 2019 Indelimane attack in the Ménaka Region of Mali. A week later in Burkina Faso, gunmen stormed a convoy of buses for the Boungou miners, killing 37, although some estimate the death toll to be much higher. This attack happened after an attack on another Niger post which resulted in the killing of three Nigerian soldiers and 14 of the assailants.

== Attack ==
A large group of gunmen stormed the base firing mortars and shooting as many soldiers as possible. The attackers included suicide bombers. The spokesman for the ministry stated that many of the attackers were neutralized by friendly forces. The attack killed 71 soldiers and injured 12 others. 30 more soldiers remained missing after the attack. Following this attack, the president, Mahamadou Issoufou, decided to cancel his trip to Egypt.

== Aftermath ==
On 12 December, The Islamic State claimed responsibility for the attack through its local branch.
