= Sinder =

Coordinates: 13°48′N 8°59′E

- Commune and village
- Interactive map of Sinder
- Country: Niger

Area
  - Total: 61.7 sq mi (159.8 km^{2})

Population (2012 census)
  - Total: 28,165
  - Density: 456.5/sq mi (176.3/km^{2})
- Time zone: UTC+1 (WAT)

Sinder is a rural commune located in the Tillabéri region of Niger and is home to the Wogo people. The primary language spoken is Wogo ciné, which belongs to the Songlai/Zarma family of languages. The primary occupations in Sinder are agriculture and fishing. Staple crops in the region include rice, maize, pepper, onions, and cereals such as manioc, millet, and sorghum, as well as Okoro during the rainy season.

As of 2012, it had a population of 28,165.

== History ==
The commune was formed by a king who fled from Gao during the fall of the Songhai Empire. Today, it is ruled by Mamoudou Djingarey, a descendant of the first king.
