= Gothèye Department =

Gothèye
- Department
- Interactive map of Gothèye
- Country: Niger
- Region: Tillabéri Region

Area
  - Total: 1,580 sq mi (4,093 km^{2})

Population (2012)
  - Total: 241,043
  - Density: 152.5/sq mi (58.89/km^{2})
- Time zone: UTC+1 (GMT 1)

Gothèye is a department of the Tillabéri Region in Niger. The department is located in the south-west of the country and borders Burkina Faso. Its administrative seat is the city of Gothèye. As of 2012, the department had a total population of 241,043 people.

== History ==
The department goes back to the administrative post (poste administratif) of Gothèye, which was established in 1956. In 2011, the administrative post was separated from the department of Téra and elevated to the department of Gothèye.

== Municipalities ==
Gothèye Department is divided into two municipalities, listed with population as of 2012 census:

- Dargol (147,779)
- Gothèye (93,264)
