= Kouré shooting =

Part of the Islamist insurgency in the Sahel

- Part of the War in the Sahel
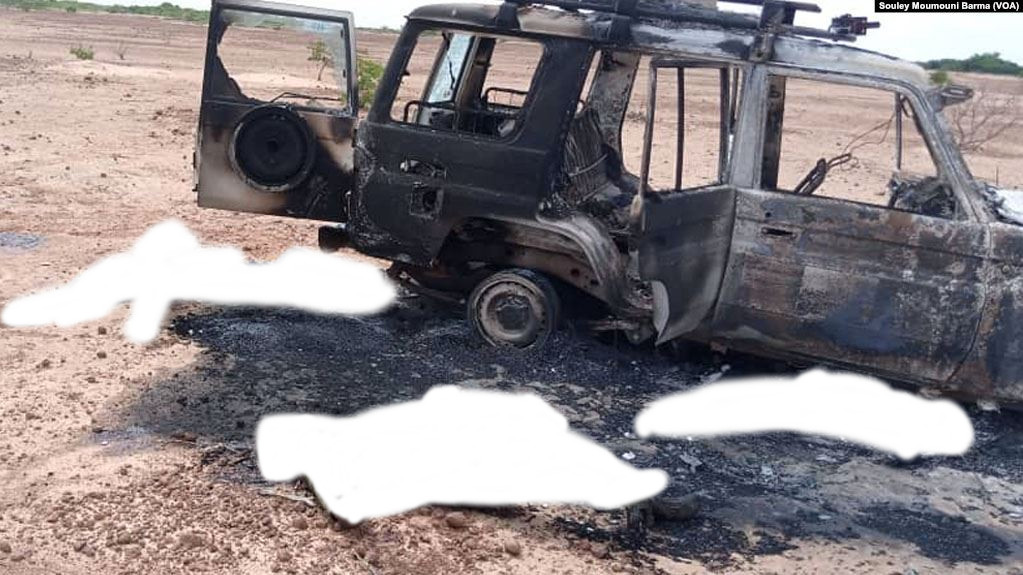
- Location: Kouré, Kollo, Tillabéri, Niger
- Date: 9 August 2020
- Target: French aid workers and Nigerien guides
- Attack type: Mass shooting
- Deaths: 8
- Perpetrator: Islamic State in the Greater Sahara

The Kouré shooting was a mass shooting that occurred in Niger on 9 August 2020. The attack left at least 8 civilians dead, six French and two Nigeriens. The attack took place in Kouré, a rural community in Tillabéri Region.

== Background ==
Tillabéri Region, which is in the west of Niger and borders Mali and Burkina Faso, is largely unstable and has been used as a hideout by various Sahel jihadist groups including the Islamic State in the Greater Sahara (ISGS). Since 2018, these terrorist groups have spread throughout the Sahel region, resulting in the deaths of hundreds of military personnel and civilians in sporadic attacks. As a result of the attacks, the region has seen extensive developments in security, such as the construction of a new U.S. airbase. In an effort to combat the terrorists, the Nigerien government also restricted the use of motorcycles in January 2019. Despite this, parts of Tillaberi and Tahoua Regions remain under a state of emergency and the French government warns people against visiting vast areas of Niger.

== Shooting ==
The shooting occurred around 11:30am (10:30 GMT) six kilometres (four miles) east of the town of Kouré, Kollo Department, Tillabéri Region, where a wildlife park is located. The region is visited by tourists and purportedly hosts the last West African giraffes. Eight people were killed in the attack. The victims were identified as two Nigeriens, of whom one was the president of the guides at the park while the other was the driver of the group, both aged 50; the other six were French citizens, all of whom aid workers aged between 25 and 30. The Islamic State claimed responsibility for the attack. Seven of the victims were shot dead, while the French woman who initially escaped was later kidnapped and murdered; an empty magazine was found at the scene. "They [the attackers] came on motorcycles through the bush and waited for the arrival of the tourists" said the governor.

== See also ==
- May 2020 Tillabéri attacks
