= Bibiyergou =

Coordinates: 14°31′36″N 1°16′44″E

- Commune and village
- Interactive map of Bibiyergou
- Country: Niger

Area
  - Total: 29.22 sq mi (75.67 km^{2})
- Elevation: 994 ft (303 m)

Population (2012 census)
  - Total: 1,853
  - Density: 63.42/sq mi (24.49/km^{2})
- Time zone: UTC+1 (WAT)

Bibiyergou is a village and rural commune in Niger.
