= Filingué =

- Town
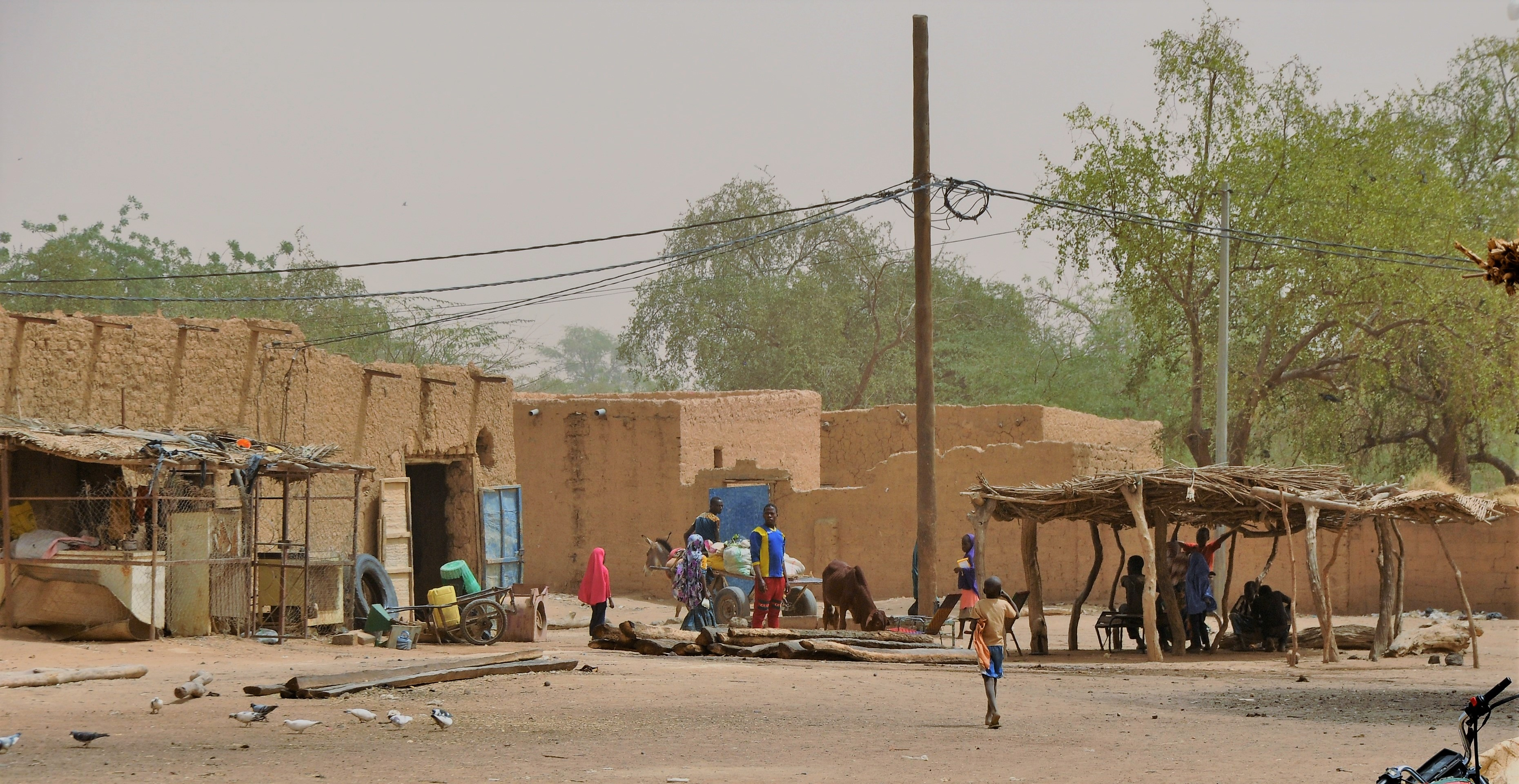
- Scene in the town's centre

- Location within Niger
- Coordinates: 14°21′0″N 3°19′0″E
- Country: Niger
- Region: Tillabéri Region
- Department: Filingué Department

Area
  - Town: 4,420 km^{2} (1,710 sq mi)
- Elevation: 225 m (738 ft)

Population (2012 Institut National de la Statistique du Niger)
  - Town: 92,097
  - Urban: 12,590
- Ethnic breakdown: 70% Fulani, 10% Djerma, 10% Tuareg, 5% Hausa, 5% originating from neighbouring countries.

Filingué is a town in southwestern Niger and is the capital city of Filingué Department and Kourfeye. It is situated on the eastern bank of the Dallol Bosso valley, some 183 km northeast of Niger's capital city Niamey.

Nigerien president Abdourahamane Tiani hails from Filingué.

As pools of stagnant water remain in this valley in the dry season there's a lot of mudbrick making.

== Gallery ==
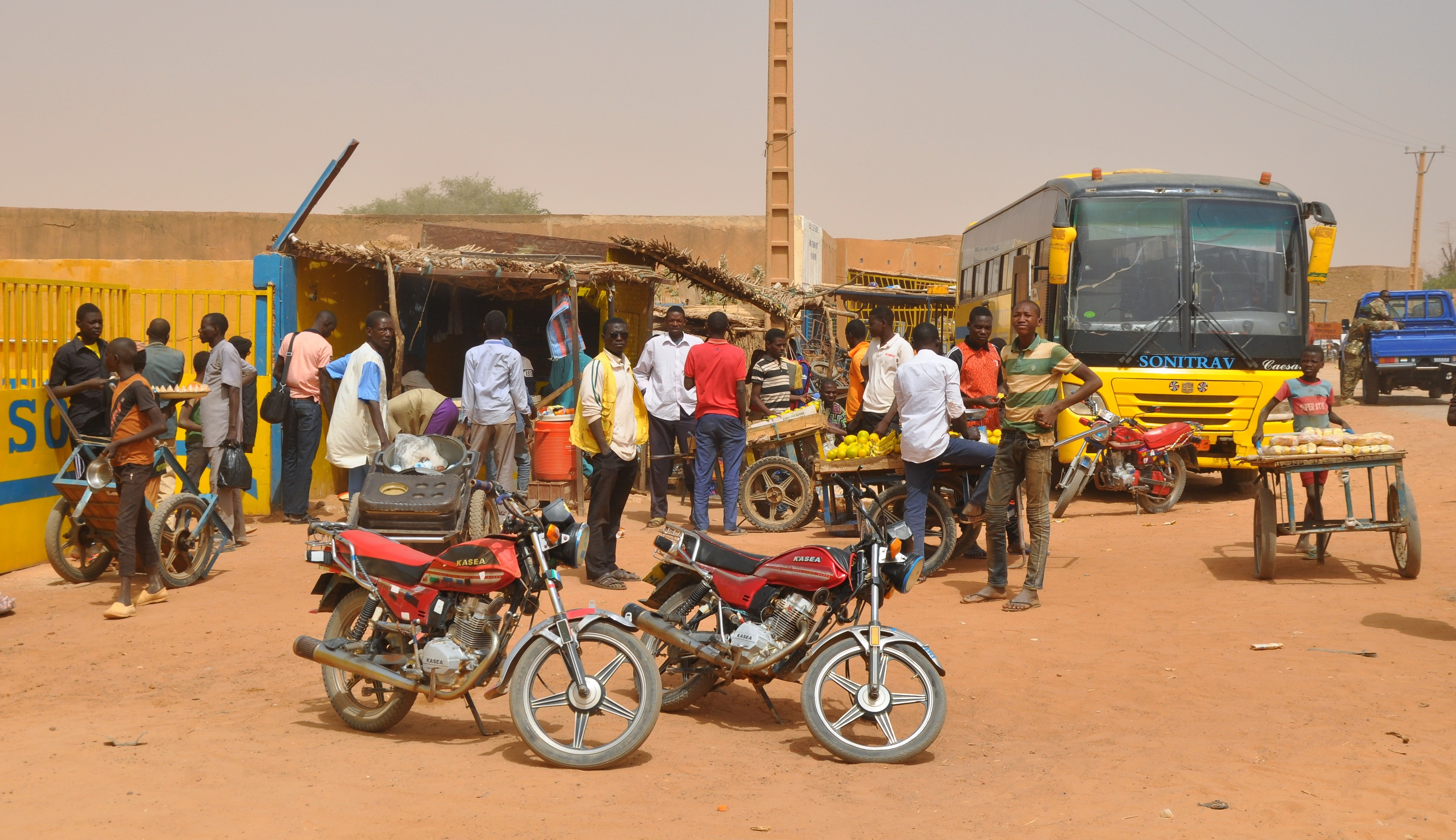
Scene at the bus station

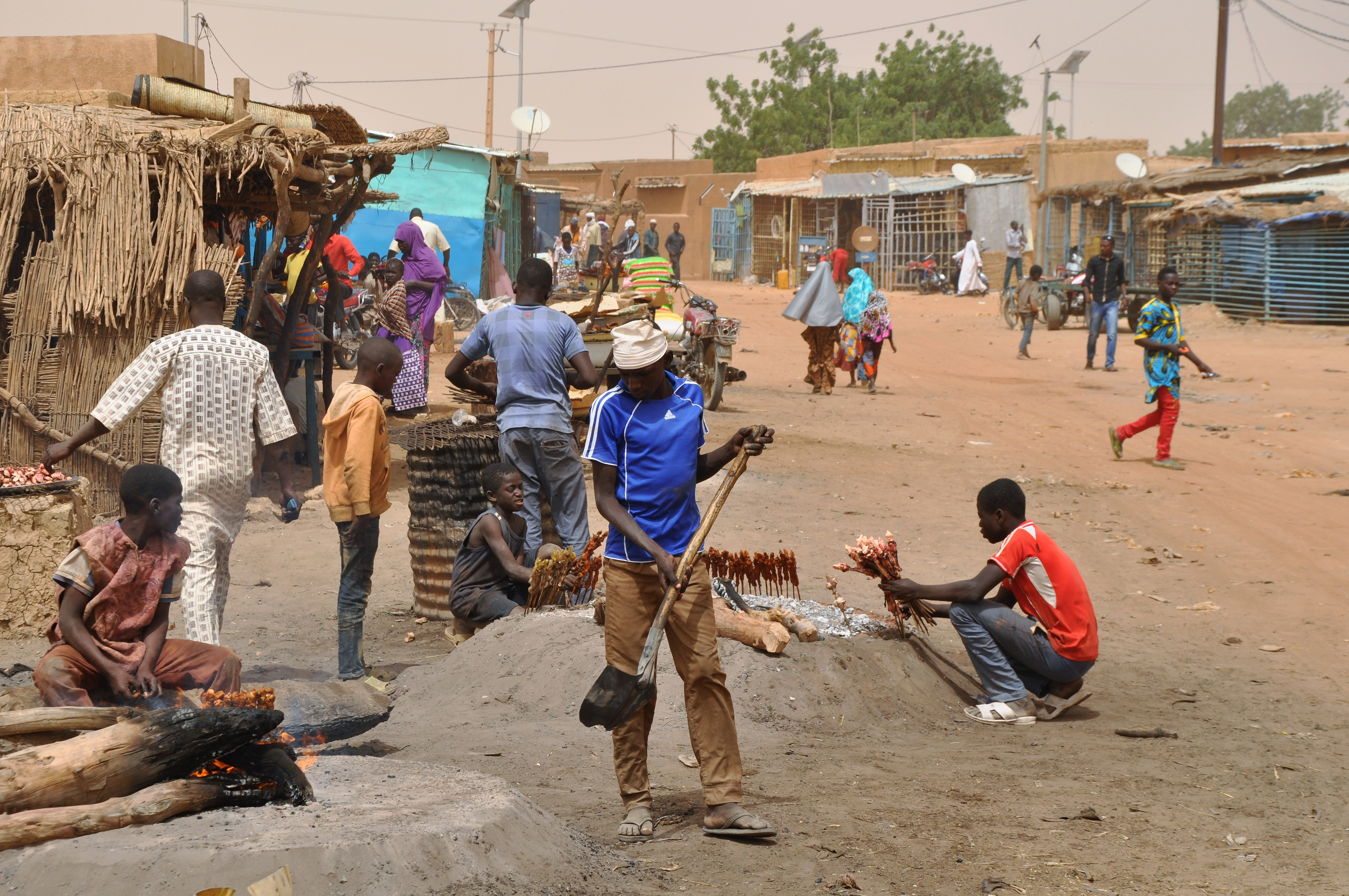
Preparing meat skewers

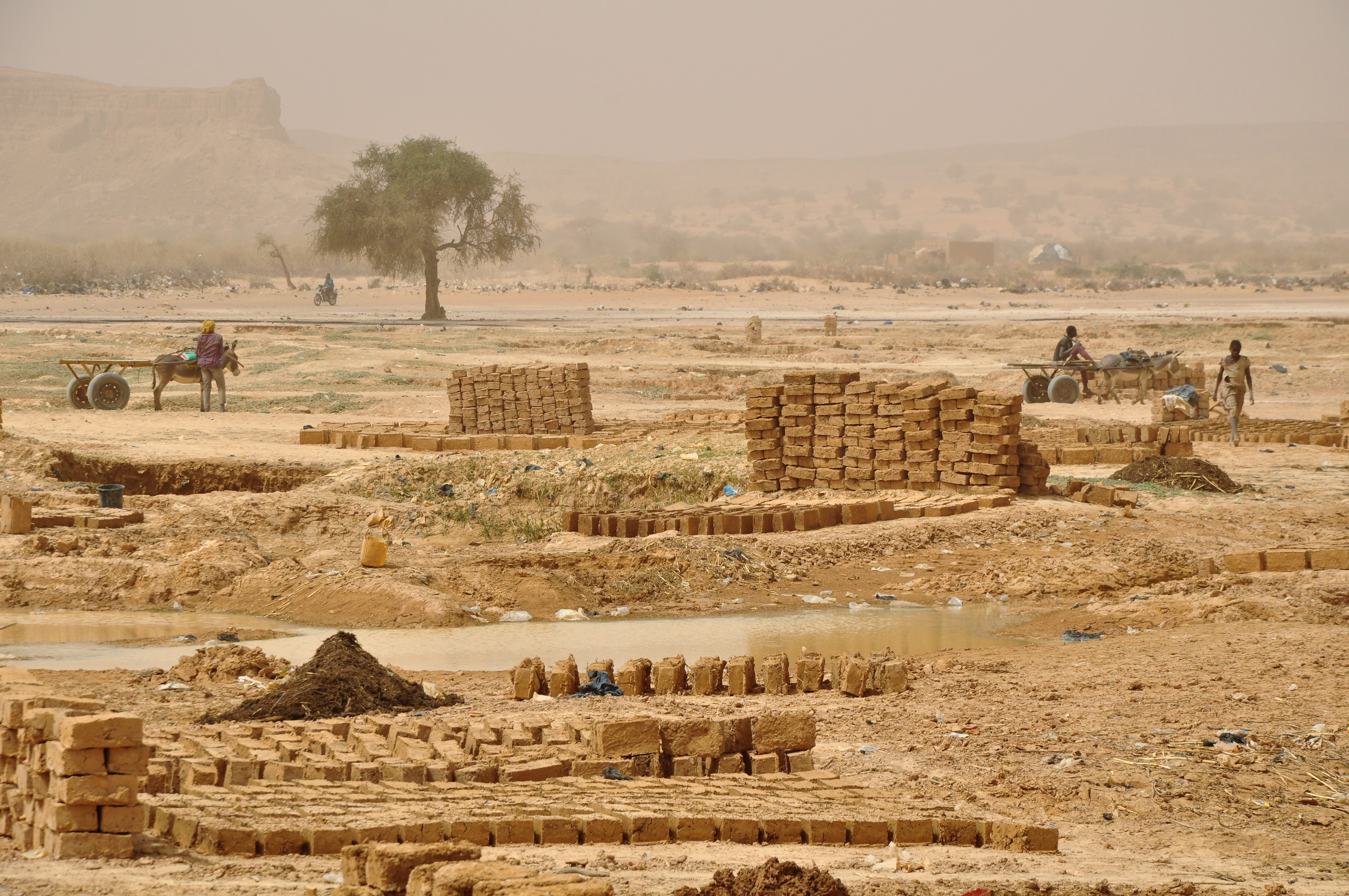
Brick making on the outskirts of town
