= Filingué Department =

Coordinates: 14°21′07″N 3°19′00″E

Filingue
- Department
- Département de Filingué
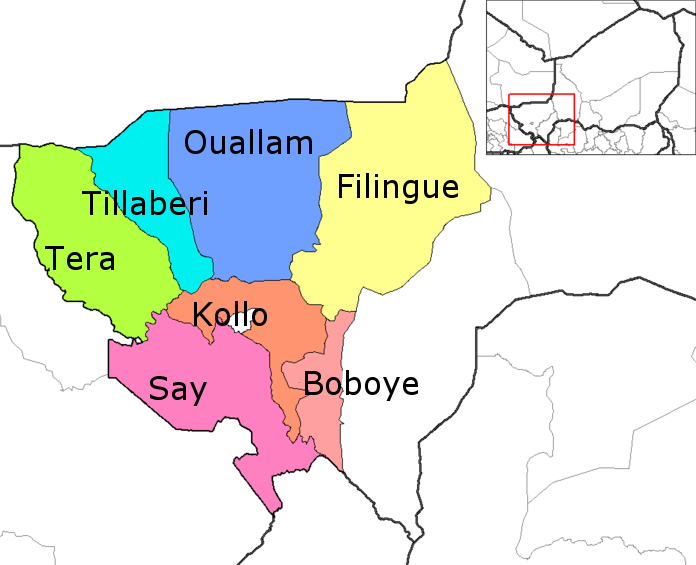
- Filingue Department location in the region
- Country: Niger
- Region: Tillabéri Region
- Departmental: Filingué

Area
  - Total: 10,470 km^{2} (4,040 sq mi)

Population (2012)
  - Total: 306,726
  - Density: 29.30/km^{2} (75.88/sq mi)
- Time zone: UTC+1 (GMT 1)

Filingué is a department of the Tillabéri Region in Niger. Its capital lies at the city of Filingué, and includes the towns of Kourfey, Bonkoukou, Tabala, and Tondikandia. As of 2012, the department had a total population of 306,726 people.

== Communes ==
- Filingué
- Imanan
- Kourfeye
- Tondikandia
