= May 2020 Tillabéri massacres =

Attack of villages in the Tillabéri Region of Niger

- Location: Gadabo, Zibane Koira-Zeno, and Zibane Koira-Tegui, Tillabéri Region, Niger
- Date: 9 May 2020; 4:00 – 5:30 p.m. (West Africa Time)
- Attack type: Terrorist attack, looting
- Deaths: 20+
- Perpetrator: Unknown jihadists

On May 9, 2020, gunmen attacked the villages of Gadabo, Zibane Koira-Zeno, and Zibane Koira-Tegui in the Tillabéri Region of Niger. At least twenty people were killed. The perpetrators and motive of the attacks are unknown.

== Background ==
The Tillabéri Region is situated in a tri-border area where the boundary of Niger meets that of Burkina Faso and Mali. Niger has been under a state of emergency since 2017; this was extended shortly before the attacks took place. Groups such as Jama'at Nasr al-Islam wal Muslimin and Islamic State in the Greater Sahara operate in areas of Tillaberi region. In January 2019, the Nigerien government limited the use of motorcycles at all hours of the day in a bid to stymie insurgents operating in the area.

All of the villages targeted in the attack are in Anzourou, a hub of jihadist activity.

== Attacks ==
Between 4:00 and 5:30 on May 9, 2020, an unknown number of gunmen on motorbikes attacked the villages of Gadabo, Zibane Koira-Zeno, and Zibane-Tegui in Tillaberi. A witness to the massacre stated that the attackers arrived on thirteen to twenty motorcycles, and attacked Gadabo first. The attackers divided into groups, and surrounded the village. In the south side of Gadabo, three people were shot. The attackers then drove off to Zibane Koira-Zeno, where three men were shot in cold blood. In Zibane Koira-Tegui, the last village to be hit, the attackers "shot at anything that moved", and even shot people hiding under their beds. The attackers also yelled not to attack women.

Seven people were each killed in Gadabo and Zibane Koira-Zeno, and six people were killed in Zibane Koira-Tegui. The attackers also ransacked shops in the villages, and stole cereal and cattle. Villagers were ordered by the militants to flee. The perpetrators then escaped to the north, towards the Malian border.

== Initial response ==
Ibrahim Tidjani Katchella, the governor of Tillaberi, told national radio that the attackers pillaged shops, but did not elaborate. No group claimed responsibility for the attacks, although Jama'at Nasr al-Islam wal Muslimin and ISGS were the prime suspects. Survivors stated that they only could see rags on the militants' heads, and it was impossible to identify a specific group.
