= Tagazar =

Coordinates: 13°45′09″N 2°58′54″E

- Commune
- Interactive map of Tagazar
- Country: Niger

Area
  - Commune: 540 sq mi (1,399 km^{2})

Population (2012 census)
  - Commune: 107,134
  - Density: 198.3/sq mi (76.58/km^{2})
  - Urban: 16,063
- Time zone: UTC+1 (WAT)

Tagazar is a village and rural commune in Niger. As of 2012, it had a population of 107,134.
