= Kourfeye =

Coordinates: 14°04′33″N 3°23′58″E

- Commune and village
- Interactive map of Kourfeye
- Country: Niger
- Time zone: UTC+1 (WAT)

Kourfeye is a village and rural commune in Niger.
