= Tillabéri =

Tillabéri Tillabéry
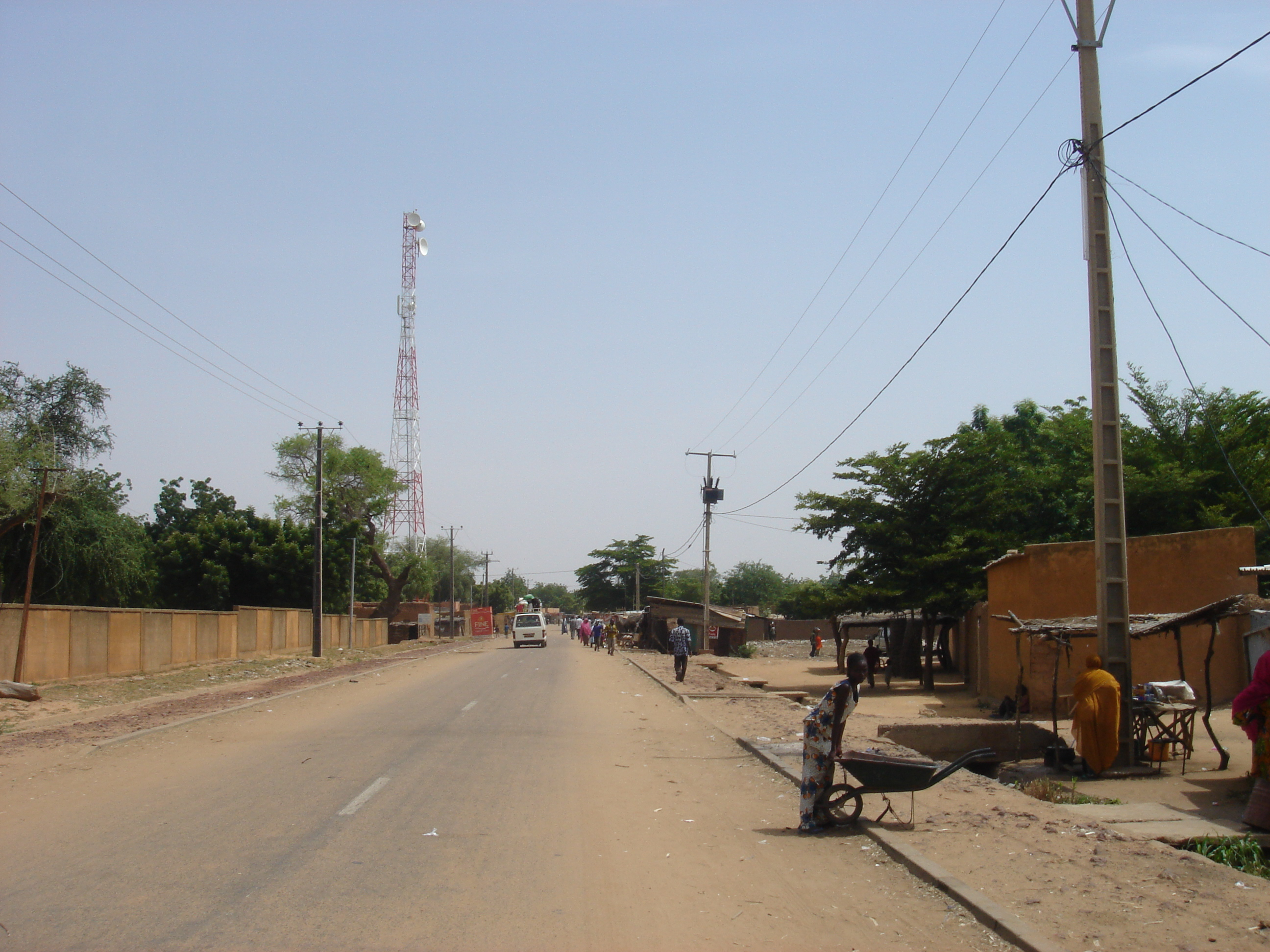
- Tillabéri in 2008

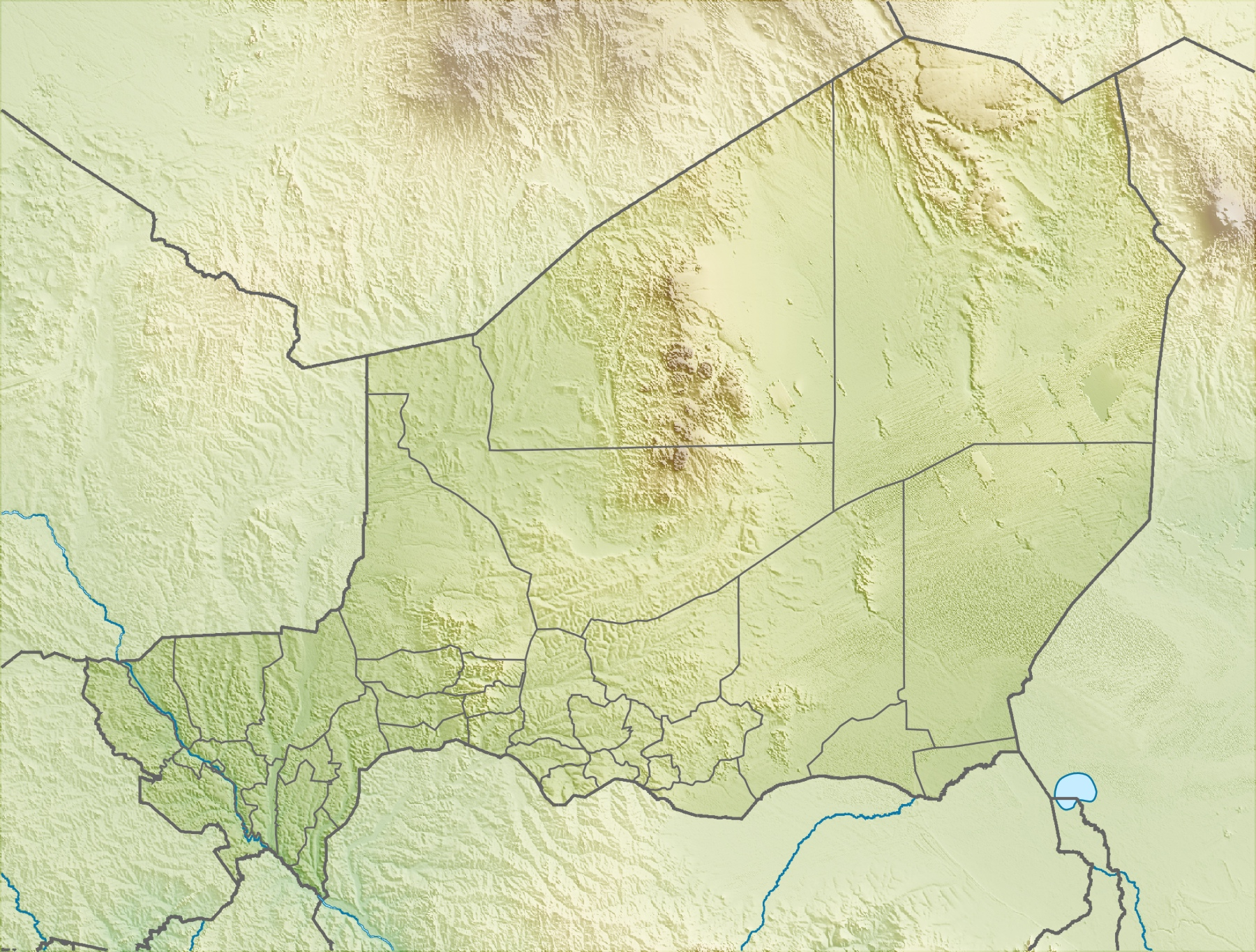
- Location in Niger
- Coordinates: 14°12′43″N 1°27′10″E
- Country: Niger
- Region: Tillabéri Region
- Department: Tillabéri Department

Area
  - City: 729.2 km^{2} (281.5 sq mi)

Population (2012)
  - City: 47,678
  - Density: 65.38/km^{2} (169.3/sq mi)
  - Urban: 22,774

Tillabéri (var. Tillabéry) is a town in the extreme west of Niger. It is situated 113 kilometres or 70 miles northwest of the capital Niamey on the River Niger. It is an important market town and administrative center, being the capital of department of Tillabéri and Tillabéri Region. The town had a population of 47,678 at the 2012 census.

== Climate ==
Tillabéri has a hot arid climate (Köppen climate classification BWh), despite receiving around 400 millimetres or 16 inches of rainfall per year, due to the extreme and persistent heat and consequent extreme potential evapotranspiration. Every month averages over 32.2 °C or 90 °F maximum temperature. Only August at the height of the wet season with its elevated and oppressive humidity, alongside December and January in the middle of the long dry season, average maxima under 35 °C or 95 °F. In terms of high temperature, even mornings are uncomfortable except during December and January, when the strong dusty harmattan wind prevails.

Climate data for Tillaberi (1961–1990)
| Month | Jan | Feb | Mar | Apr | May | Jun | Jul | Aug | Sep | Oct | Nov | Dec | Year |
|---|---|---|---|---|---|---|---|---|---|---|---|---|---|
| Mean daily maximum °C (°F) | 32.3 (90.1) | 35.6 (96.1) | 38.9 (102.0) | 41.4 (106.5) | 41.5 (106.7) | 38.8 (101.8) | 35.4 (95.7) | 33.7 (92.7) | 35.6 (96.1) | 38.4 (101.1) | 36.4 (97.5) | 33.0 (91.4) | 36.7 (98.1) |
| Daily mean °C (°F) | 24.6 (76.3) | 27.5 (81.5) | 30.9 (87.6) | 33.6 (92.5) | 34.7 (94.5) | 32.7 (90.9) | 30.2 (86.4) | 28.9 (84.0) | 30.1 (86.2) | 31.2 (88.2) | 28.4 (83.1) | 25.3 (77.5) | 29.8 (85.7) |
| Mean daily minimum °C (°F) | 17.0 (62.6) | 19.4 (66.9) | 22.8 (73.0) | 25.9 (78.6) | 27.9 (82.2) | 26.7 (80.1) | 24.9 (76.8) | 24.1 (75.4) | 24.5 (76.1) | 23.9 (75.0) | 20.4 (68.7) | 17.5 (63.5) | 22.9 (73.2) |
| Average rainfall mm (inches) | 0.0 (0.0) | 0.0 (0.0) | 2.3 (0.09) | 5.6 (0.22) | 16.6 (0.65) | 46.8 (1.84) | 102.7 (4.04) | 143.1 (5.63) | 69.9 (2.75) | 10.8 (0.43) | 0.3 (0.01) | 0.1 (0.00) | 398.2 (15.66) |
| Mean monthly sunshine hours | 285.2 | 260.4 | 269.7 | 246.0 | 272.8 | 255.0 | 248.0 | 235.6 | 249.0 | 279.0 | 279.0 | 279.0 | 3,175.5 |
Source: NOAA
