= Dessa, Niger =

Coordinates: 14°31′58″N 1°06′00″E

- Commune and village
- Interactive map of Dessa, Niger
- Country: Niger
- Time zone: UTC+1 (WAT)

Dessa, Niger is a village and rural commune in Niger.
