= Kourteye =

Coordinates: 13.8489°N 1.60694°E

- Commune and village
- Interactive map of Kourteye
- Country: Niger

Area
  - Land: 491 sq mi (1,272 km^{2})

Population (2012 census)
  - Total: 61,670
  - Density: 125.6/sq mi (48.48/km^{2})
- Time zone: UTC+1 (WAT)

Kourteye is a village and rural commune in Niger. As of 2012, it had a population of 61,670.
