= Imanan =

Coordinates: 14°00′40″N 3°12′53″E

- Commune and village
- Interactive map of Imanan
- Country: Niger
- Time zone: UTC+1 (WAT)

Imanan is a village and rural commune in Niger.
