= Torodi =

- Commune
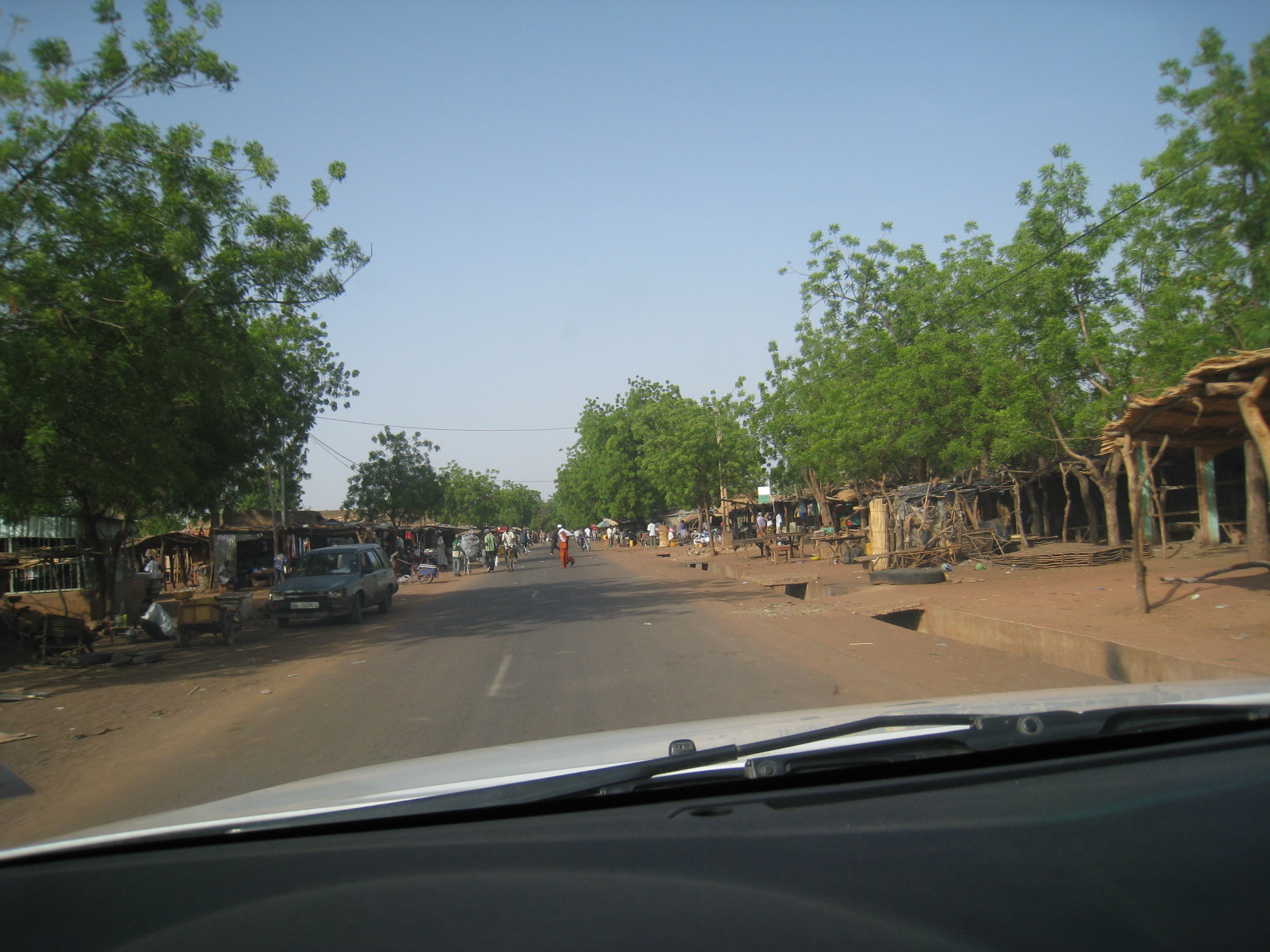
- Torodi in 2009

- Location in Niger
- Coordinates: 13°07′N 1°48′E
- Country: Niger
- Region: Tillaberi Region
- Department: Say Department

Area
  - Commune: 2,179 sq mi (5,643 km^{2})

Population (2012 census)
  - Commune: 109,342
  - Density: 50.19/sq mi (19.38/km^{2})
  - Urban: 11,813
- Time zone: UTC+1 (WAT)

Torodi is a small town and a rural commune in Niger. As of 2012, it had a population of 109,342. As a rural center, Torodi hosts a large weekly market and the seat of local tribal authority (canton). Torodi is in the Say Department of the Tillaberi Region, which surrounds the national capital, Niamey. Say Department, with its capital at the large Niger River town of Say, abuts Niamey to the southwest and across the river to the west. The town of Torodi lies about 60 km due west of the city of Say and 50 km east of the border with Burkina Faso. Torodi itself lies on a tributary of the Niger, the Gourbi river.

Torodi has historically been a crossroads of Zarma and Songhay people form the north, and the Gourma people, who dominated most of the area that is now Say Department until the 18th century CE. The 18th century saw expansion of Fulani people, south along the Niger from Gao and the Inland Niger Delta, as well as east from what is now northeast Burkina Faso. While the dominant Fulani Muslim Emirates of this period were based in Liptako to the north and Say to the east, Torodi itself was capital of a smaller Fulani state, which persisted into the colonial period.

Torodi rural commune includes several villages, supported by seasonal millet agriculture, pastoral cattle raising, and the collection of firewood to be sold in Niamey.

== See also ==
- Liptako: the culturally similar historic region and Emirate to the north and west of Torodi
- Tera Department directly to the north
