= Inates =

Coordinates: 13°58′08″N 3°11′54″E

- Commune and village
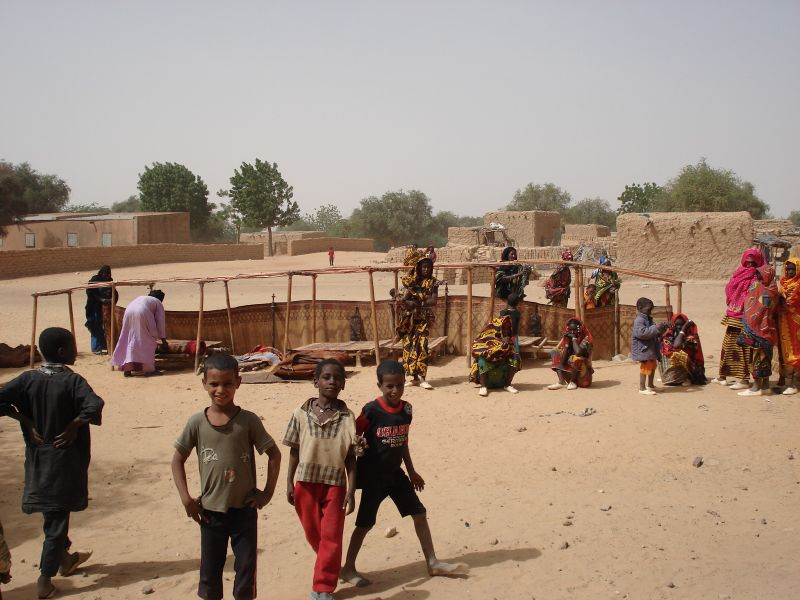
- Villagers disassembling a lean-to in Inates
- Interactive map of Inates
- Country: Niger
- Region: Tillabéri

Area
  - Total: 686 sq mi (1,776 km^{2})

Population (2012 census)
  - Total: 23,503
  - Density: 34.28/sq mi (13.23/km^{2})
- Time zone: UTC+1 (WAT)

Inates is a village and rural commune in the Tillabéri Region of Niger. As of 2012, it had a population of 23,503.

== History ==
On 10 December 2019, one of the most deadly attacks in the history of Niger occurred. Islamic State attacked a military post with guns, bombs and mortars - killing 71 soldiers and kidnapping some others.
