= National Guard of Niger =

Paramilitary branch of Niger's military

Nigerien National Guard Gardin Sarki Nijar Garde Nationale du Niger
- Abbreviation: GSN; GNN

Agency overview
- Preceding agencies: Forces Nationales d'Intervention et Securite (1997–2011); Garde Republicaine (1963–1997)
- Employees: c. 3,200

Jurisdictional structure
- Operations jurisdiction: Niger
- Constituting instrument: Ordinance No 201-61 of October 7, 2010
- General nature: Civilian police
- Specialist jurisdictions: Paramilitary law enforcement, counter insurgency, riot control; National border patrol, security, integrity

Operational structure
- Agency executive: Chef d'escadron Oumarou Tawayé, Superior Commander of the National Guard
- Parent agency: Ministry of Interior, Public Safety and Decentralization

The Nigerien National Guard (Hausa: Gardin Sarki Nijar; French: Garde Nationale du Niger), formerly known as the Forces Nationales d’Intervention et de Securité (1997–2011) and Garde Republicaine (1963–1997), is a paramilitary corps of the Armed Forces of Niger under the control of the Ministry of Interior, Public Safety and Decentralization. It is headed by the superior commander of the national guard.

== History ==
The National Guard was first created in 1963 as the Republican Guard under the presidency of President Diori Hamani. Due to its loyalty to President Hamani, following the 1974 coup by President Seyni Kountche, it was restructured to ensure loyalty to Seyni Kountche. During those years, the guard was primarily tasked of protecting the president and was made up of elite soldiers trained by Moroccan officers. After the 1995 peace agreements between the government of Niger and the Touareg rebel groups, it was restructured and renamed to "Forces Nationales d'Interventions and Securite (FNIS)". Ex-rebel members were reinserted into this body as per the terms of the peace agreements. Previously under the authority of Ministry of Defense, the national guard was transferred under the authority of the Ministry of Interior in 2003. Faithful to their tradition, the National Guard remained loyal to President Mamadou Tandja in his attempt to prolong his presidency beyond the constitutional limits of his term. Later, during the 2010 military coup, the National Guard unsuccessfully defended President Tandja Mamadou. In 2010 and 2011, several government decrees and ordinances proceeded to its reorganization and renaming to the National Guard of Niger.

== Mission ==
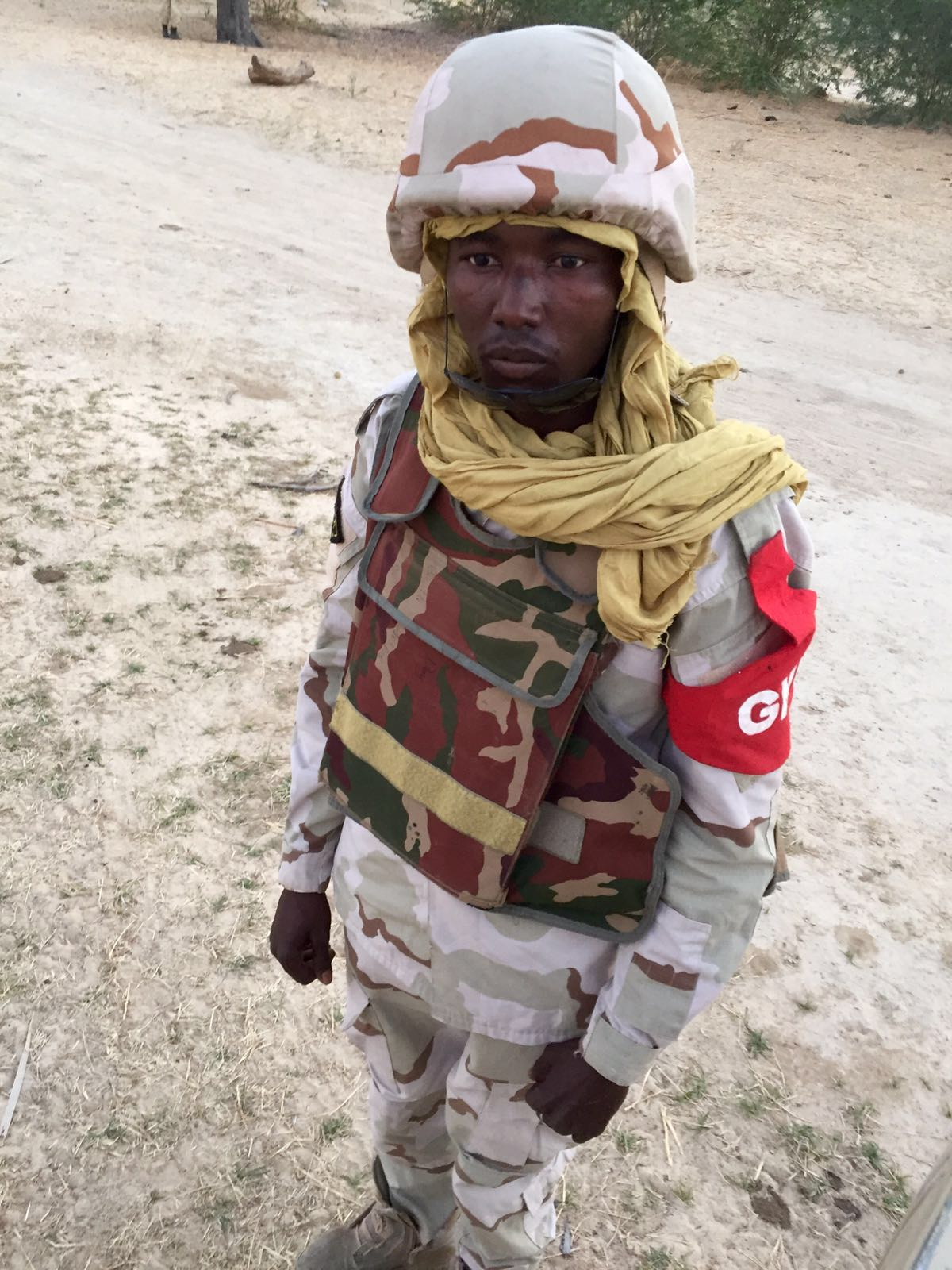
A National Guard personnel deployed in Diffa against Boko Haram in 2016

The mission of the national guard of Niger is defined by ordinance n°201-61 of October 7, 2010 and consists of:

- monitoring the national territory
- maintaining public safety and restoring public order
- protecting public buildings, people and their property
- participating in defense emergency preparedness
- carrying out judiciaries and administrative inquiries
- conducting policing duties in rural areas and pastorals
- providing honor services for the authorities
- providing protection to republican institutions
- participating in the operational territorial defense
- providing administration, management and monitoring of prisons
- participating in development activities in the country (i.e. humanitarian operations)
- participating in peacekeeping in international commitments made by the Niger,
- protecting the environment
- searching and detecting offenses under the criminal laws
- providing assistance to administrative authorities and the diplomatic and consular representations of Niger

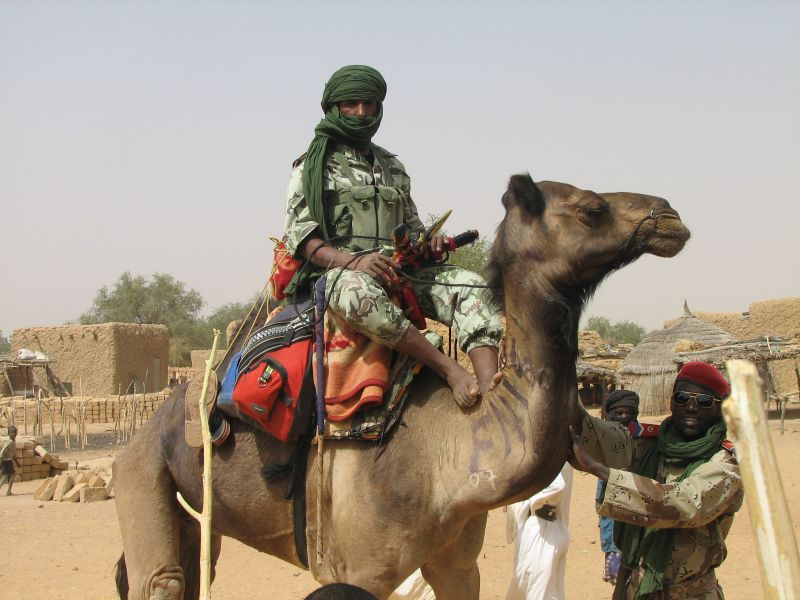
Camel corps soldier of the Niger National Guard in the village of Inatès, January 14, 2007.
