= Anzourou =

Coordinates: 14°29′10″N 1°18′18″E

- Commune and village
- Interactive map of Anzourou
- Country: Niger
- Region: Tillabéri
- Department: Tillabéri

Area
  - Total: 652 sq mi (1,688 km^{2})
- Elevation: 1,050 ft (320 m)

Population (2012 census)
  - Total: 28,878
  - Density: 44.31/sq mi (17.11/km^{2})
- Time zone: UTC+1 (WAT)

Anzourou is a village and rural commune in Niger. As of 2012, it had a population of 28,878.
