= Sanam, Niger =

Coordinates: 14°50′N 3°55′E

Sanam
- Commune and village
- Interactive map of Sanam
- Country: Niger

Area
  - Total: 2,136 sq mi (5,531 km^{2})

Population (2012 census)
  - Total: 68,466
  - Density: 32.06/sq mi (12.38/km^{2})
- Time zone: UTC+1 (WAT)

Sanam is a village and rural commune in Niger.

In 2012 it had a population of 68,466.
