= Tillabéri Region =

Region of Niger

Tillabéri
- Region
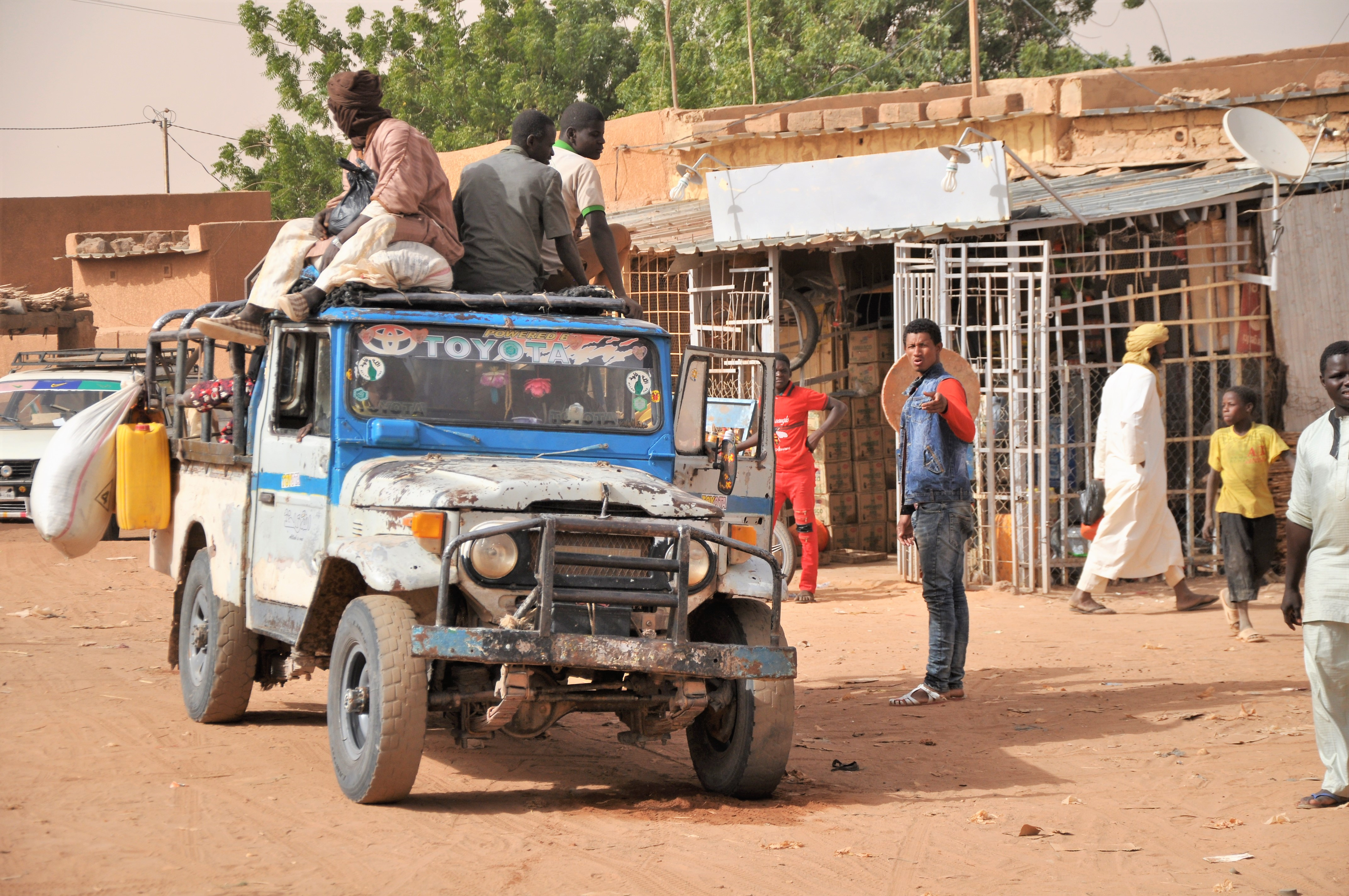
- Street scene in Filingué, Tillabéri in 2019

- Location within Niger
- Coordinates: 14°13′N 1°27′E
- Country: Niger
- Capital: Tillabéri

Government
  - Governor: Hassoumi Djabirou

Area
  - Total: 89,623 km^{2} (34,604 sq mi)

Population (2012)
  - Total: 2,722,482
  - Density: 30.377/km^{2} (78.676/sq mi)
- Time zone: UTC+1 (West Africa Time)
- HDI (2021): 0.512 low · 1st of 7

Tillabéri (var. Tillabéry) is one of the seven regions of Niger. The capital of the region is Tillabéri. Tillabéri Region was created in 1992, when Niamey Region was split, with Niamey and its immediate hinterland becoming a new capital district enclaved within Tillabéri Region.

== Geography ==
Tillabéri borders Mali (Gao Region) to the north, Tahoua Region to the east, Dosso Region to the southeast, Benin (Alibori Department) to the south, and Burkina Faso (Sahel Region and Est Region) to the west. The Niamey Capital District forms an enclave within the region. Tillabéri contains almost all of Niger's share of the Niger River, as well as several seasonal (known as Gorouol, Sirba) and permanent (known as Mékrou, Tapoa) watercourses. The W National Park is located in the extreme south of the region and extends into Burkina Faso and Benin. The northwestern areas of the region (Ouallam and Filingué) have a savannah type flora and fauna.

=== Settlements ===
Tillabéri is the regional capital; other major settlements include Abala, Ayourou, Banibangou, Bankilare, Filingué, Ouallam, Say, Téra and Torodi.

=== Administrative subdivisions ===
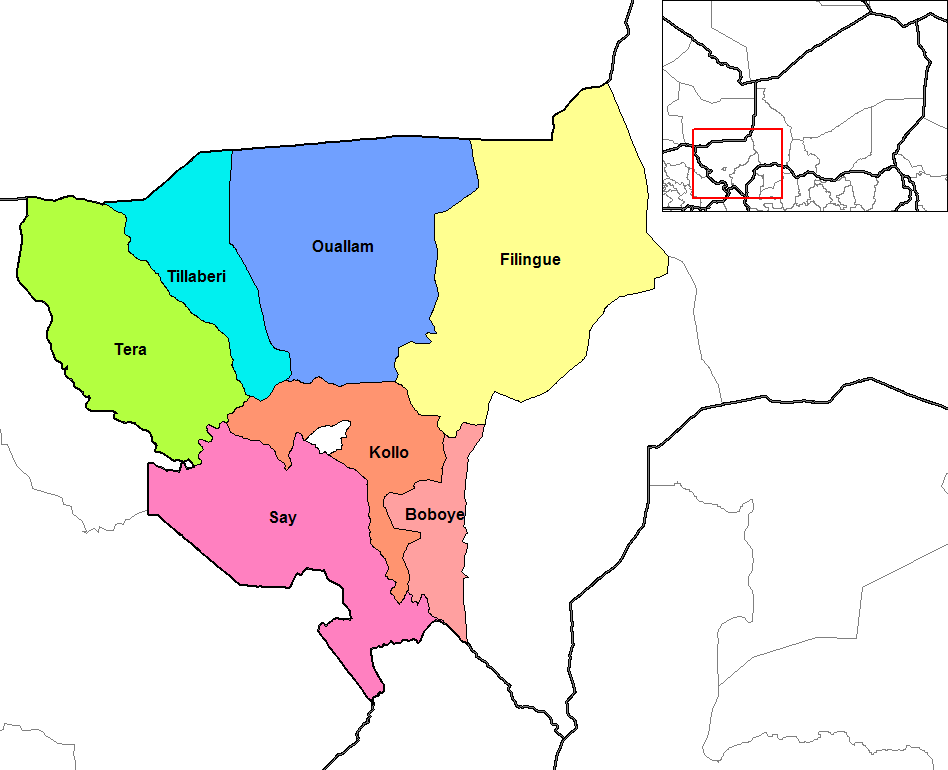
Departments of Tillabéri (old borders)

Tillabéri is divided into 13 departments:

- Abala Department
- Ayourou Department
- Balléyara Department
- Banibangou Department
- Bankilaré Department
- Filingué Department
- Gothèye Department
- Kollo Department
- Ouallam Department
- Say Department
- Téra Department
- Tillabéri Department
- Torodi Department

== Climate ==
Tillabéri has a hot arid climate (BWh in the Köppen climate classification) despite receiving almost 400 millimetres or 16 inches of rainfall per year, due to the extreme heat and high evaporation.

Climate data for Tillaberi (1961-1990)
Month	Jan	Feb	Mar	Apr	May	Jun	Jul	Aug	Sep	Oct	Nov	Dec	Year
Mean daily maximum °C (°F)	32.3 (90.1)	35.6 (96.1)	38.9 (102.0)	41.4 (106.5)	41.5 (106.7)	38.8 (101.8)	35.4 (95.7)	33.7 (92.7)	35.6 (96.1)	38.4 (101.1)	36.4 (97.5)	33.0 (91.4)	36.7 (98.1)
Daily mean °C (°F)	24.6 (76.3)	27.5 (81.5)	30.9 (87.6)	33.6 (92.5)	34.7 (94.5)	32.7 (90.9)	30.2 (86.4)	28.9 (84.0)	30.1 (86.2)	31.2 (88.2)	28.4 (83.1)	25.3 (77.5)	29.8 (85.7)
Mean daily minimum °C (°F)	17.0 (62.6)	19.4 (66.9)	22.8 (73.0)	25.9 (78.6)	27.9 (82.2)	26.7 (80.1)	24.9 (76.8)	24.1 (75.4)	24.5 (76.1)	23.9 (75.0)	20.4 (68.7)	17.5 (63.5)	22.9 (73.2)
Average rainfall mm (inches)	0.0 (0.0)	0.0 (0.0)	2.3 (0.09)	5.6 (0.22)	16.6 (0.65)	46.8 (1.84)	102.7 (4.04)	143.1 (5.63)	69.9 (2.75)	10.8 (0.43)	0.3 (0.01)	0.1 (0.00)	398.2 (15.66)
Mean monthly sunshine hours	285.2	260.4	269.7	246.0	272.8	255.0	248.0	235.6	249.0	279.0	279.0	279.0	3,175.5
Source: NOAA

== Demographics ==
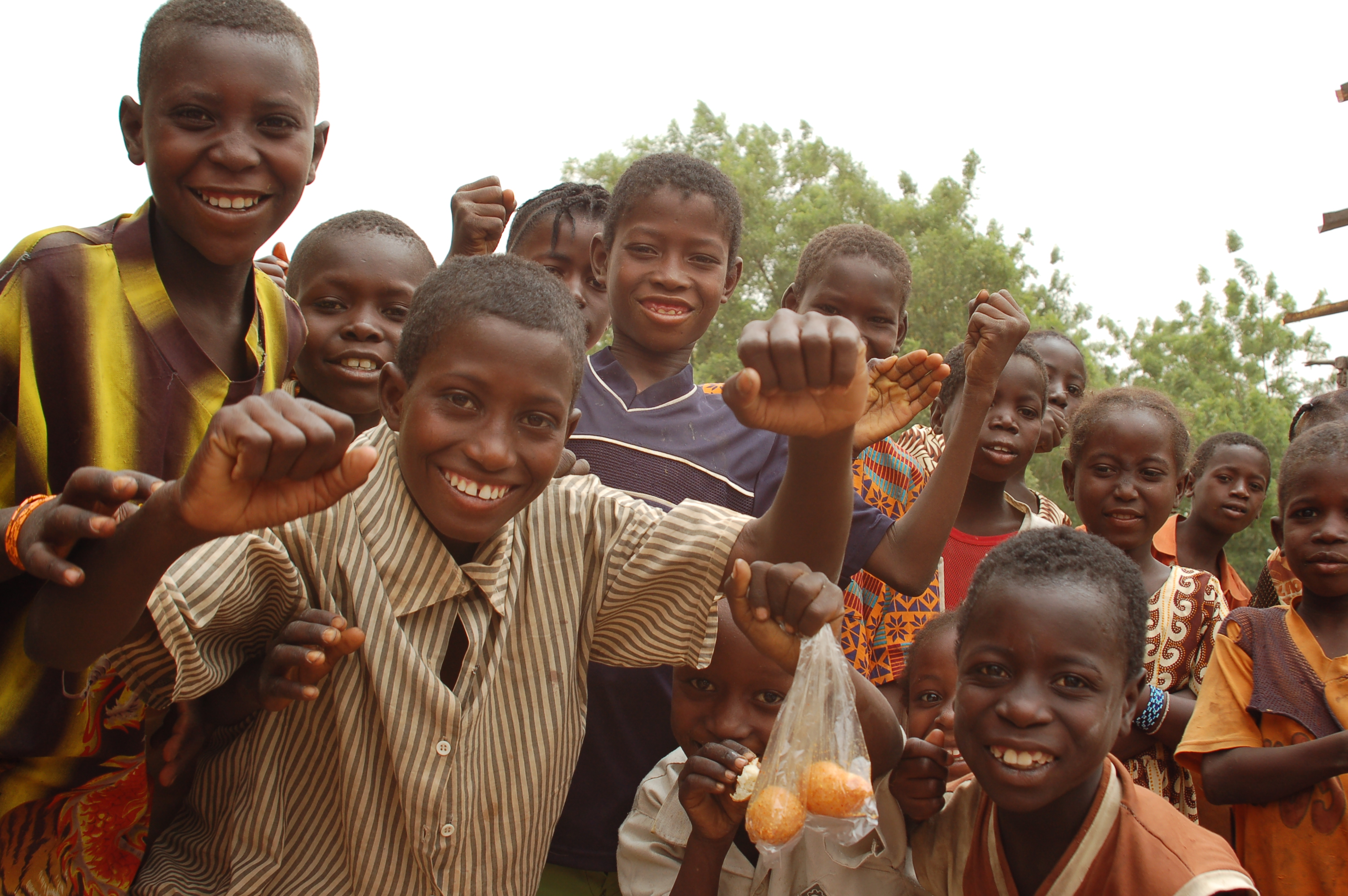
Youth in Kouré village, 2006

As of 2012 the population of the region was 2,722,482. The main ethnolinguistic groups are the Zarma (also referred to as 'Djerma') and Songhai with minority Tuareg, Fulani, and Hausa populations.

Historical population
Year	Pop.	±%
1977	928,849	—
1985	1,328,283	+43.0%
2001	1,872,436	+41.0%
2012	2,722,482	+45.4%

== Economy ==
The economy of the region of Tillabéri is based primary on agriculture, livestock and fishery production. However, Tillabéri is rich in mineral resources (gold and iron ore) and increasingly becoming attractive for future mining investments. In 2004, the first gold mine in Téra began operation. In addition, the region of Tillabéri has great touristic potential with W National Park, the Niger river and many more attractions.

=== Agriculture, livestock and fishery ===
Based on data from the National Statistics Institute of Niger, The region of Tillaberi is 1st producer of rice (5,700 tonnes), 5th for sorghum (40,900 tonnes), 5th for millet (39,940 tonnes), 3rd for corn (1,100 tonnes), 5th for black-eyed peas (15,300 tonnes) and 5th in peanut (2,400 tonnes) in 2011 among regions. It is also an important livestock producer and the 1st producer of cattle with recorded 2087 thousand cattle heads in 2011. Although the Niger river is crossing through this region, it is only the 3rd producer of fishery products with 637 thousand tonnes in 2011.

=== Mining ===
The region is home to the Samira Hill Gold Mine in Téra, which opened in 2004. In addition to gold, the region is rich in iron ore with estimated reserves of 650 million tonnes in Say.

== Tourism ==
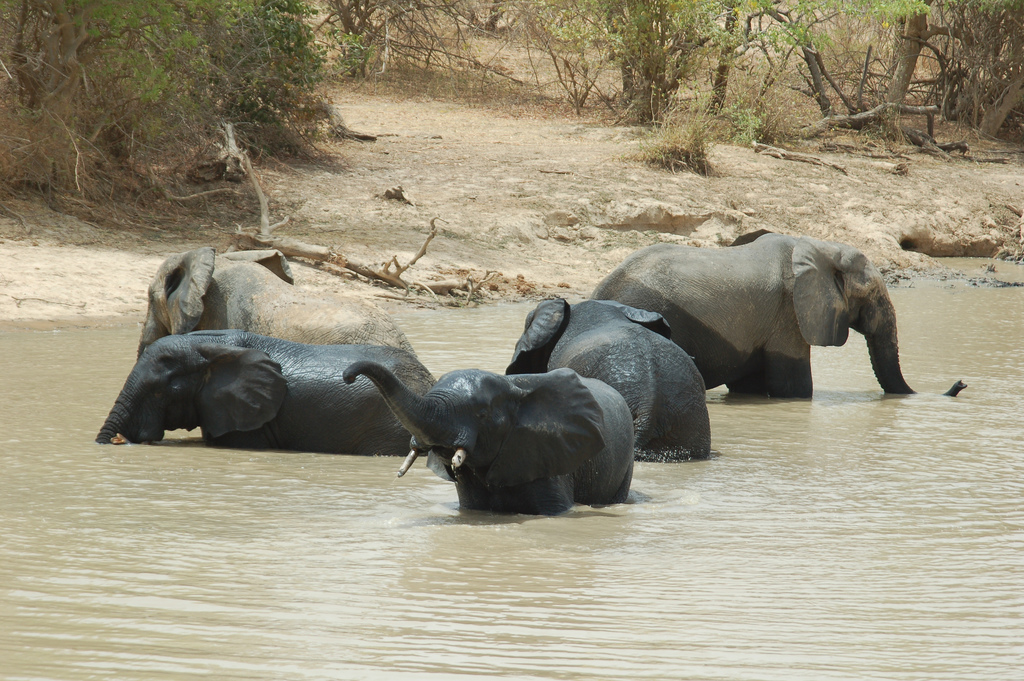
Elephants in W Park

The region of Tillabéri has many tourist sites. The W National Park, which straddles the tri-border area of Benin-Burkina Faso-Niger, is classified as a World Heritage Site by UNESCO. The park contains a wide variety of fauna and flora on side located in Niger. The region has a modest hospitality infrastructure with only two 4-star hotels and 137 rooms (42 rooms for the 4 star hotels).

== Crime ==
Tillabéri is badly affected by the insurgency in the Maghreb. Major attacks occurred in January 2020, May 2020, August 2020, January 2021 and March 2025.

In September 2025, twenty-two people were killed in the Tillabéri region, during and after a baptism.

== See also ==
- Departments of Niger
- Regions of Niger
- Communes of Niger
