= Illela, Niger =

Coordinates: 14.46°N 5.24°E

- Commune
- Interactive map of Illela, Niger
- Country: Niger
- Region: Tahoua Region
- Department: Illela Department

Area
  - Commune: 753 sq mi (1,951 km^{2})
- Elevation: 1,020 ft (310 m)

Population (2012 census)
  - Commune: 142,214
  - Density: 188.8/sq mi (72.89/km^{2})
  - Urban: 22,491
- Time zone: UTC+1 (WAT)

Illela, Niger is a town and urban commune in Niger.

== Geography ==
Illéla is located in the Sahel zone on the edge of the Ader Doutchi mountain landscape. The neighboring municipalities of Illéla are Bambeye in the north, Badaguichiri in the northeast, Tajaé in the southeast, Alléla in the south and Bagaroua in the west.

The urban area is divided into 14 urban districts and a rural part with 69 villages and 34 hamlets. The 14 districts are Azna, Azna Zaroumèye, Baïtché, Dabagawa, Dabsaou, Illéla (Kétaré), Illéla Kétaré, Illéla Nassarawa, Illéla Toudou, Kétaré, Nassaraoua, Toudou, Toudou (neighborhood) and Zaroumèye. The city center is at an altitude of 312 m. The larger villages in the rural municipality include Toullou, Dafawa, Dangona and Dandadji.

== History ==
Illéla was founded by Tuareg in the 18th century. At the beginning of the 19th century, the place became the capital of the Ader province of the Sultanate of Agadez instead of Birni Ader. Serki n’Ader served here as governor of the Sultan. When the province broke up into several parts at the end of the 19th century, the serki n'Ader of Illéla only controlled a small area in western Ader.

Illéla fell to France at the beginning of the 20th century. The local market was one of the small markets in the region that were permitted by the French administration at the time. The British travel writer A. Henry Savage Landor visited the villages of Illéla, Agourmi, Dangona and Daouréré in 1906 as part of his twelve-month journey across Africa. He described the large Hausa granaries in Illéla, built in various designs.

In 1960, the year of Niger's independence, Illéla became the capital of the Illéla district, from which the Arrondissement of Illéla emerged in 1964 and the department of Illéla in 1998. The village of Dagona in the municipality of Illéla was one of the most affected places in the country during the 2005/06 hunger crisis in Niger. Here the population had less than one meal a day. In the 2010 West African floods, over 2000 residents of Illéla were impacted.

== Demographics ==
At the 2012 census, the municipality had a population of 142,214 living in 22,684 households. The majority of the population is Hausa (80%), followed by Tuareg (8%) and Fulani (2%).

Census	Population
2001	91,312
2012	142,214

== Sights ==
The city's sights include the ruler's palace of Illéla and the mosque in the village of Libatan Mallameye.
