= Bouza Department =

Coordinates: 14°25′N 6°02′E

Bouza
- Department
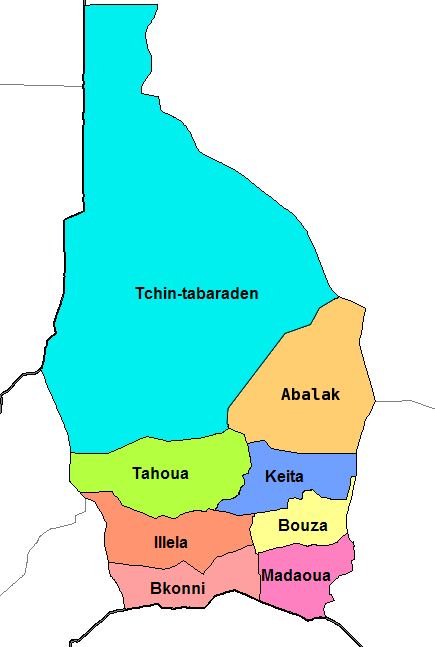
- Bouza Department location in the region
- Country: Niger
- Region: Tahoua Region
- Departmental: Bouza

Area
  - Total: 3,777 km^{2} (1,458 sq mi)

Population (2012)
  - Total: 445,363
  - Density: 117.9/km^{2} (305.4/sq mi)
- Time zone: UTC+1 (GMT 1)

Bouza is a department of the Tahoua Region in Niger. Its capital lies at the city of Bouza, and also includes the town of Déoulé. As of 2012, the department had a total population of 445,363 people.

== Culture and situation ==
Bouza Department is in a largely Hausa-speaking area, which has become in the last century an area of marginal agriculture. There are also populations of Fula and Tuareg peoples who traditionally engage in nomadic and semi-nomadic animal husbandry: the Fula Woadabe with cattle and the Tuareg largely with camel. The major highway of the region, completed in the 1970s, bypassed Bouza to the west, heading south from Regional capitol Tahoua to the large southern city of Birni-N'Konni near the Nigerian border. The major (unpaved) road in the area -- RN16 runs through Bouza town from Madaoua to the south to Keita in the north, before reaching Tahoua in the northwest of the Region.

Soil degradation, desertification, and poverty have meant that much of the young male population are involved in seasonal work outside the area, either in the south, Niamey, in other areas of West or North Africa. One side effect of this has left areas of Bouza Department vulnerable to HIV transmission. International Red Cross and Care International studies refer to one area of the department as the "Valley of the Widows", so high is the rate of young male mortality from HIV - AIDS. Because of the poverty of the area, Bouza region was especially hard hit in the 2005 Niger food crisis, and has been reported as a center of ongoing Cholera and childhood malnutrition. To slow desertification and soil degradation, Bouza department during the late 1960s through to the 1980s completed several successful forestry projects, some managed by U.S. Peace Corps Volunteers working in Niger's Waters and Forest Service (Eaux et Forets). The Majjia Valley field windbreak project was a success, the Yegalalan sand dune stabilization project led-to additional dune stabilization projects throughout the country, and currently one can see the fencing for savanna restoration project east of Bouza, near Karofane.

== Communes ==
- Allakaye
- Babankatami
- Bouza
- Deoule
- Karofane
- Tabotaki
- Tama
