= Tassara =

Tassara Tassarra, Tasara
- Commune and village
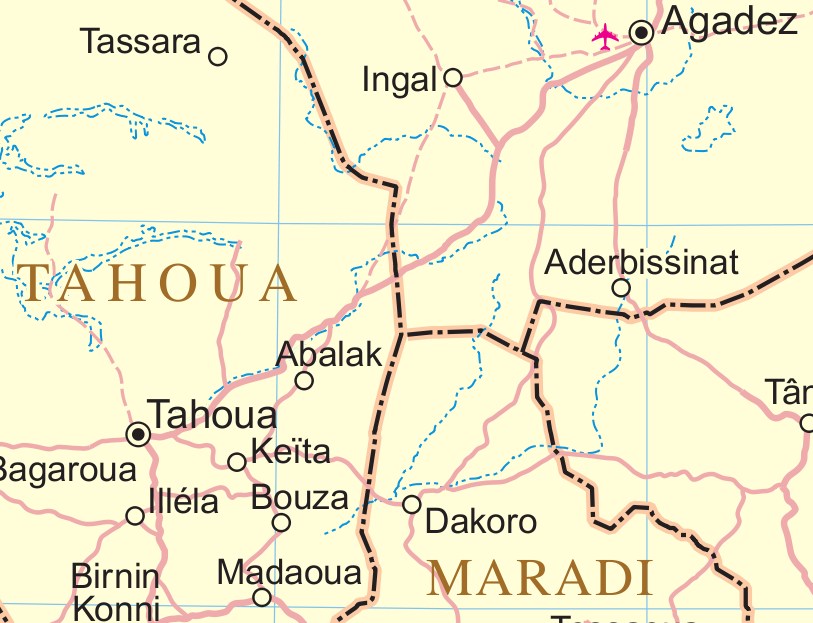
- Tassara and the towns of northwest Niger

- Location within Niger
- Coordinates: 16°48′N 5°39′E
- Country: Niger
- Department: Tchintabaraden
- Region: Tahoua

Area
  - Total: 11,355 sq mi (29,409 km^{2})

Population (2012 census)
  - Total: 24,457
  - Density: 2.1539/sq mi (0.83162/km^{2})
- Time zone: UTC+1 (WAT)

Tassara is a village and rural commune in Niger.

== Geography ==
Tassara rural commune lies at the junction of the Sahel and the Sahara, receiving just enough yearly rainfall to make seasonal nomadic pasturage possible. The neighboring communes are Ingall to the northeast, Abalak to the southeast, Tchintabaraden to the southwest and Tillia to the northwest. The commune is subdivided into 19 administrative villages, four hamlets, 25 encampments (nomadic villages) and 27 wells. The administrative center of is the village of Tassara, but the commune itself covers a large distance. The larger villages include Agawan, Ajmelli, Azanag, Tarassadet, and Louberat. Tassara commune forms the north of the wedge shaped Abalak Department, itself forming the east central section of the Tahoua Region. Tahoua Region comprises eight Departments, forming much of the Nigerien border with Mali, and stopping just short of the Algerian border in the north. In the 2010 census, the entire commune's population was just 24,187, up from 17,952 in 2001.

== History and culture ==
Tassara town—with a population of around 700 in the 1990s—was built as an administrative center in the 1970s in the wake of the drought and famine which caused such displacement amongst nomadic communities. Tassara was center of the nomadic Azawagh Arabs, and one writer has described it as the Nigerien community's "defacto capital". The area forms the easternmost concentration of the Galgaliyya (or Hassaniya) Arabic-speaking communities that stretch west into Mali.

The Rural Commune of Tassara was created as an administrative unit in 2002 as part of a nationwide administrative reform and decentralization. At the local elections in July 2004 Mahamed Chérif (PNDS-Tarayya) was elected mayor On 15 April 2010, the Council of Ministers appointed Mahamed Chérif administrator (Administrateur Délégué) from the town and Abdou Adamou to head the administrative post (chef de poste administratif) of Tassara.

Every two years in October, Tassara and the neighboring village of Tillia host a gathering of local Arab pastoralists. Like the Tuareg Cure Salee of neighboring Ingall, the gathering marks the end of the rainy season pasturage. Herders gather their animals for the trek to southern grasslands where they will stay until returning with the rains in June.

Tassarra was the site of an electoral conflict during the Nigerien parliamentary election, 2009, an election later annulled by the February 2011 coup d'état government. At the official certification of the results on 11 November 2009, the government announced that one seat, won by an independent candidate for the Tassara constituency, was annulled by the Constitutional Court of Niger, and a by-election for that seat would take place at an unspecified date.

Following the outbreaks of civil war in Libya and Mali, Niger—including the Tassara area—saw great fears of instability. In June 2012 local officials oversaw the decommissioning of military weapons by a group of local young men in Tassara.
