= Mirriah =

- Commune
- Location in Niger
- Coordinates: 13°42′40″N 9°09′20″E
- Country: Niger

Area
  - Commune: 132.3 sq mi (342.6 km^{2})
- Elevation: 1,335 ft (407 m)

Population (2012 census)
  - Commune: 80,126
  - Density: 605.7/sq mi (233.9/km^{2})
  - Urban: 28,407
- Time zone: UTC+1 (WAT)

Mirriah is a town and urban commune in Niger.

== Geography ==
Mirriah is located in the Sahel region, around 20 kilometres from the regional capital of Zinder. Mirriah's neighbouring municipalities are Gaffati to the north-west, Zermou to the north-east, Hamdara to the east, Wacha to the south-east, Gouna to the south-west and Kolléram to the west. The municipality lies at an average altitude of 400 metres in a sandy lowland with a very low gradient.

The municipality of Mirriah consists of an urban and a rural area. The urban municipality is divided into 16 neighbourhoods. These are called Ali Kader, Bakari, Camp de Garde, Dilari, Galadima, Kofal Bey, Makéra, Marafa, Marina, Quartier Administratif, Sabon Gari, Sarkin Makafi, Tchébani Boukari, Tchédia, Tchinkassari and Torawa. The settlements in the rural municipal area comprise 48 villages and 80 hamlets.

== History ==
The name of the town comes from the Hausa language and means "voice".

Mirriah became the seat of an independent Sossébaki state under the ruler Bazaza in 1774. The Hausa dynasty of the Sossébaki traced its centuries-old rule back to a prince from Bornu. Bazaza died in 1784 in battle against his uncle. Bazaza's brother Ibel then took power in Mirriah until 1817, which under his reign overshadowed the large neighbouring city of Zinder. However, his son and successor Mohamed Kosso was defeated by Sultan Sélimane dan Tintouma of Zinder in 1821 and driven into exile in Sokoto. The sultan appointed May Nassara, another son of Ibel, as ruler of Mirriah. Mohamed Kosso managed to return for a few months, but was finally defeated by his brother, who ruled Mirriah as a vassal of the Sultan until 1837.

Under Djibril dan Lafia, who had been in power since 1897, Mirriah was assigned to the French province of Zinder as a canton. When the French took control of the large market in the town and were now responsible for collecting taxes, the number of traders fell from over 2,000 to 400. Mirriah was at times the most populous town in the French colony of Niger. In 1926, 14,721 inhabitants were counted here, while the two alternating capitals of the colony were smaller: Zinder had 7176 inhabitants at the time and Niamey 3142. In the 1920s, the 1375-kilometre road from Niamey to N'Guigmi, which ran through Mirriah, was considered one of the main transport routes in the Niger colony. The old Sossébaki rulers have acted as cantonal chiefs and traditional village chiefs (chefs traditionnelles) of Mirriah since the French colonial period.

In addition to its role as a traditional seat of power, Mirriah gained importance as a regional administrative centre in the independent Republic of Niger. The capital of the arrondissement of Zinder was moved to Mirriah in 1966 and the arrondissement was renamed Mirriah at the same time. The department of Mirriah emerged from the arrondissement of Mirriah in 1998. Mirriah was given the status of an independent municipality in 1988 along with nine other Nigerien towns. Until then, there had been twelve municipalities across the country.

== Demographics ==
In the 2012 census, the municipality had 80,126 inhabitants. Around 30,000 people lived in the urban area.

Census	Population (municipality)	Population (urban)
1977		8,420
1988		13,225
2001	43,364	19,161
2012	80,126	28,407

== Culture ==
The Friday Mosque of Mirriah, a courtyard mosque in a sparse, mid-Nigerian style, is located in the centre of the city, west of the Sultan's Courtyard. Its year of construction is unknown. The associated eight metre high minaret dates back to 1750 and is still an original part of the old adobe building.

== Economy ==
The economic cornerstones of the municipality are agriculture and livestock farming. There is also trade, crafts and services. A weekly market is held in Mirriah.
