= Barmou =

Coordinates: 15°06′N 5°24′E

- Commune and village
- Interactive map of Barmou
- Country: Niger
- Region: Tahoua
- Department: Tahoua

Area
  - Total: 308.3 sq mi (798.4 km^{2})
- Elevation: 1,309 ft (399 m)

Population (2012)
  - Total: 43,856
  - Density: 142.3/sq mi (54.93/km^{2})
- Time zone: UTC+1 (WAT)

Barmou is a village and rural commune in Niger. As of 2012, it had a population of 43,856.
