= Intoussan ambush =

2021 battle between Niger and Islamic State

- Part of Jihadist insurgency in Niger
Date	May 1, 2021
Location	Intoussan, Tillaberi Region, Niger
Result	ISGS victory

Belligerents
Niger	Islamic State in the Greater Sahara

Commanders and leaders
Lt. Maman Namewa †	Unknown

Casualties and losses
16 killed, 6 wounded, 1 missing (per Nigerien govt); 27 killed, 10 wounded, 2 missing (per MENASTREAM)	Unknown
- 4 civilians killed (per ICG)

On May 1, 2021, at least sixteen Nigerien soldiers were killed in an ambush in Intoussan, Tillabéri Region, Niger by the Islamic State in the Greater Sahara. Nigerien officials reported the ambush as initially being located in Tillia, Tahoua Region, although footage from the attack posted by ISGS later showed the ambush occurring in Intoussan.

== Background ==
Following widespread massacres in the first half of 2021 against non-Fulani ethnic groups and villages that support the Nigerien government or Jama'at Nasr al-Islam wal-Muslimin by the predominantly-Fulani Islamic State in the Greater Sahara (ISGS), various non-Fulani areas formed self-defense militias in Tillabéri Region and Tahoua Region to prevent future attacks by ISGS. To counter these attacks, ISGS pushed further into Tahoua Region to attack Nigerien soldiers. In March 2021, ISGS massacres against civilians in Tillia killed over 140 civilians and sparked the creation of self-defense militias in the area.

== Ambush ==
The details of the ambush were first published by Ibrahim Miko, the secretary-general of the Tahoua Region. Miko stated that sixteen Nigerien soldiers had been ambushed in Tillia, and that six others were wounded and one was missing. Among the dead were the commander of the patrol, Lieutenant Maman Namewa.

International Crisis Group later reported that the attack took place at a Nigerien outpost in Intoussan, Banibangou Department, located in Tillabéri Region. The ISGS fighters were heavily armed and ambushed the patrol aboard motorcycles, sparking clashes with the soldiers. The ICG statement also reported that four civilians were killed in the attack alongside the sixteen soldiers. These details were confirmed by MENASTREAM in May with footage used from ISGS' statement claiming the ambush. MENASTREAM stated that twenty-seven soldiers were reported killed along with two others missing and ten wounded.

ACLED reported that there were two separate "large-scale" attacks in Tillia and Intoussan. The ICG reported that the Intoussan ambush took place on May 4, while Miko stated that the Tillia ambush took place on May 1; both attacks were attributed to ISGS and both killed sixteen soldiers.
