= May 2025 Eknewane attack =

- Part of Islamist insurgency in Niger
Date	May 25, 2025
Location	Eknewane, Tahoua Region, Niger
Result	ISSP victory

Belligerents
Niger	Islamic State - Sahel Province

Casualties and losses
64+ killed Many injured	Unknown

On May 25, 2025, militants from the Islamic State – Sahel Province (ISSP) attacked a Nigerien outpost in Eknewane, Tahoua Region, Niger, killing at least 64 Nigerien soldiers.

== Background ==
In July 2023, disgruntled officers overthrew Nigerien president Mohamed Bazoum in a coup, claiming that Bazoum's government was not effectively countering the insurgencies of the Islamic State in the Greater Sahara and Jama'at Nasr al-Islam wal-Muslimin in the western part of the country. JNIM and ISGS are most active in the tri-border area between Niger, Mali, and Burkina Faso, the latter two having had coups that installed military juntas within the past two years. The Tillia department of Tahoua Region, where Eknewane is located, has been a hotspot of Islamic State activity for years. Eknewane itself had been the target of two extremely deadly ISSP attacks; one in September 2024 that killed 24 soldiers, and one in February 2025 that killed at least 46 soldiers.

== Attack ==
At the time of the attack on May 25, the camp at Eknewane was being defended by members of the BRS special forces, the intelligence and surveillance battalion, and the national guard. Several hundred jihadists on motorbikes attacked the camp, sparking a large battle. The battle as a whole lasted for less than an hour, and ISSP militants used drone reconnaissance throughout it. After ransacking and capturing the base, the militants fled.

Initial reports said that at least 40 soldiers were killed during the battle. The commander at the base was captured and executed by ISSP. Some of the soldiers at Eknewane managed to flee the attack. At least eleven soldiers were buried at the base, and the remainder were flown out to Tahoua where Chief of Staff Moussa Salaou Barmou attended their funerals. Many injured soldiers were taken to Niamey Referral Hospital, and at least six soldiers died of their injuries while there.

== Aftermath ==
A day after the Eknewane attack, a military outpost in Falmey was attacked, with 45 of the 71 soldiers at the base being killed by Jama'at Nasr al-Islam wal-Muslimin. In Eknewane, Chief of Staff Barmou visited the base in the days after the attack. Nigerian authorities also reported that "dozens" of militants had been killed in retaliatory drone strikes.
