= Mirriah Department =

Coordinates: 13°42′26″N 9°09′00″E

Mirriah
- Department
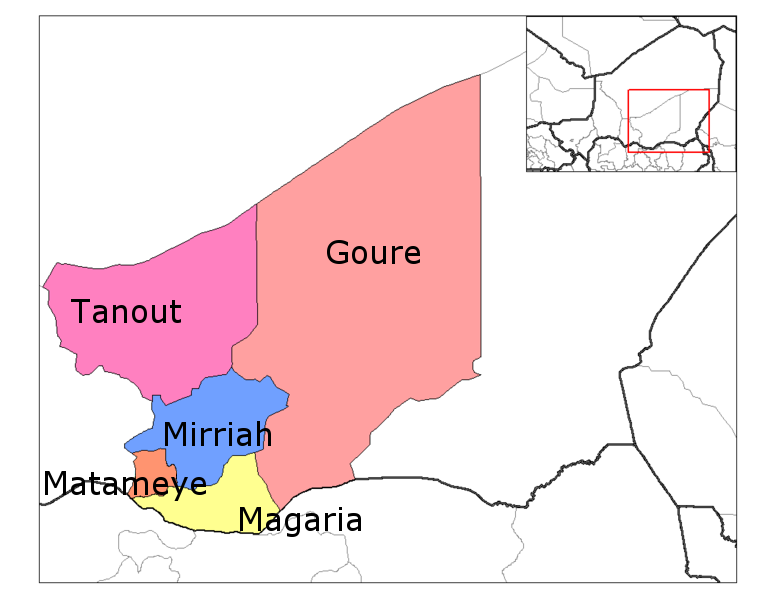
- Mirriah Department location in the region (old borders)
- Country: Niger
- Region: Zinder Region

Area
  - Total: 1,425 sq mi (3,692 km^{2})

Population (2012 census)
  - Total: 507,499
  - Density: 356.0/sq mi (137.5/km^{2})
- Time zone: UTC+1 (GMT 1)

Mirriah is a department of the Zinder Region in Niger. Its capital lies at the city of Mirriah, although its largest city is Zinder. As of 2012, the department had a total population of 507,499 people.

== Communes ==
- Dogo
- Droum
- Gaffati
- Gouna
- Hamdara
- Kolleram
- Mirriah
- Zermou
