= Magaria =

- Commune
- Location in Niger
- Coordinates: 12°59′53″N 8°54′35″E
- Country: Niger
- Region: Zinder
- Department: Magaria

Area
  - Commune: 249.8 sq mi (647.1 km^{2})
- Elevation: 1,300 ft (400 m)

Population (2012 census)
  - Commune: 130,707
  - Density: 523.1/sq mi (202.0/km^{2})
  - Urban: 25,928
- Time zone: UTC+1 (WAT)

Magaria is a town and urban commune in the magaria bande of the Zinder Region of Niger.

== Geography ==
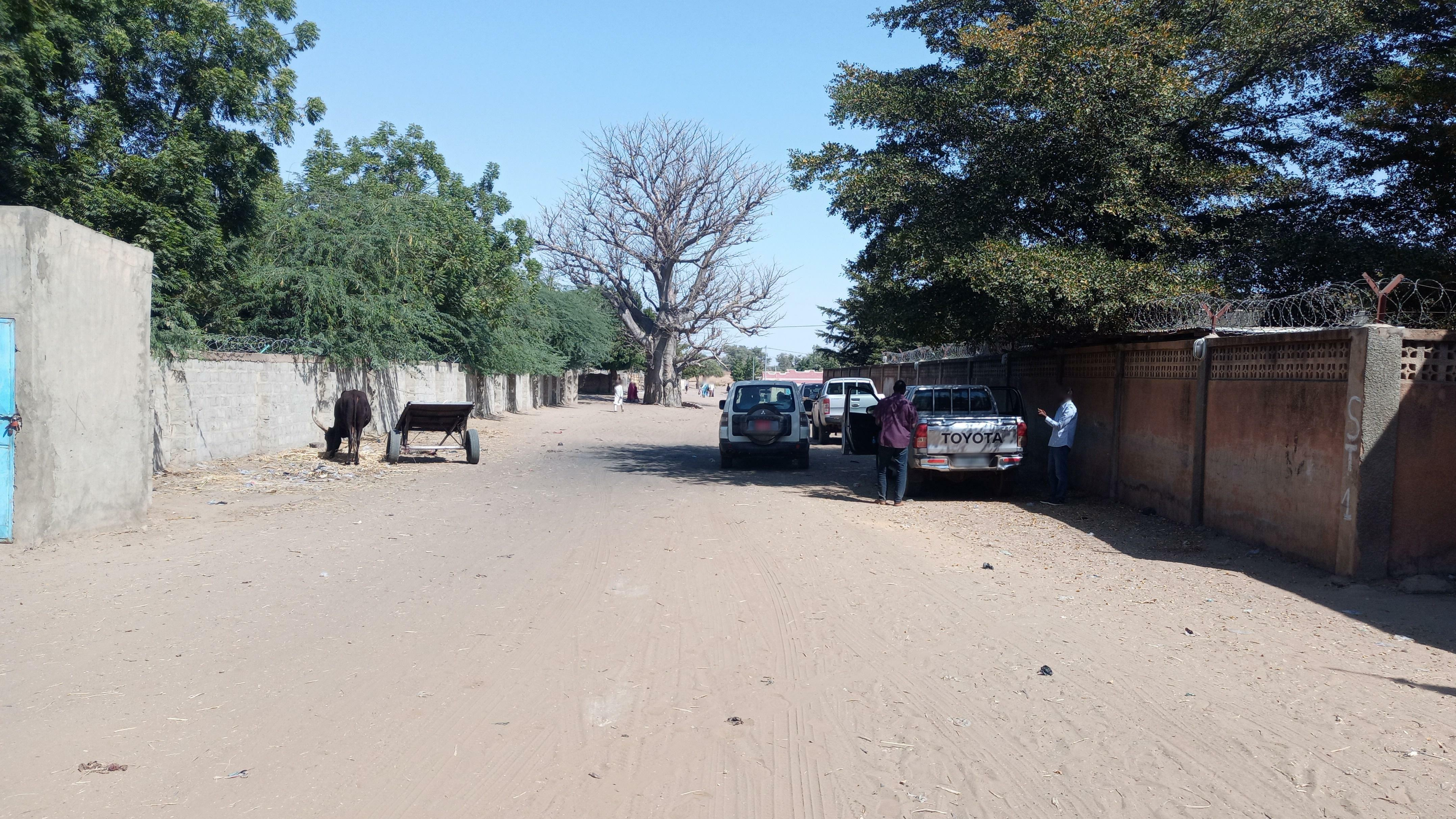
City street in Magaria (2023)

Magaria is located in the greater Sudan region and borders the neighbouring state of Nigeria to the south, the municipalities of Kwaya and Yékoua to the west, the municipality of Bandé to the north and the municipality of Dantchiao to the east. The municipality of Magaria consists of an urban and a rural municipal area. The urban area is divided into eleven neighbourhoods. These are called Chawa, Dan Chiffine, Gaon Kolli, Ghaga, Kitari, Maï Damoussa Haoussa, Maï Damoussa Peulh, Ménages Collectifs, Nassarawa, N'Wala and Toudoun Wada. There are 109 villages, 58 hamlets and three camps in the rural area of the municipality.

=== Climate ===
Climate data for Magaria (1961–1990)
Month	Jan	Feb	Mar	Apr	May	Jun	Jul	Aug	Sep	Oct	Nov	Dec	Year
Mean maximum °C (°F)	34.3 (93.7)	37.8 (100.0)	41.4 (106.5)	43.0 (109.4)	42.9 (109.2)	41.6 (106.9)	37.7 (99.9)	36.7 (98.1)	39.0 (102.2)	39.4 (102.9)	37.9 (100.2)	35.4 (95.7)	43.0 (109.4)
Mean daily maximum °C (°F)	30.5 (86.9)	33.8 (92.8)	37.5 (99.5)	40.4 (104.7)	40.2 (104.4)	37.5 (99.5)	33.7 (92.7)	32.4 (90.3)	34.6 (94.3)	36.9 (98.4)	34.4 (93.9)	31.4 (88.5)	35.3 (95.5)
Daily mean °C (°F)	21.1 (70.0)	23.9 (75.0)	27.9 (82.2)	31.5 (88.7)	32.4 (90.3)	30.9 (87.6)	28.3 (82.9)	27.2 (81.0)	28.3 (82.9)	28.5 (83.3)	24.8 (76.6)	21.8 (71.2)	27.2 (81.0)
Mean daily minimum °C (°F)	11.7 (53.1)	13.9 (57.0)	18.3 (64.9)	22.5 (72.5)	24.5 (76.1)	24.3 (75.7)	22.8 (73.0)	21.9 (71.4)	22.1 (71.8)	19.9 (67.8)	15.2 (59.4)	12.5 (54.5)	19.1 (66.4)
Mean minimum °C (°F)	5.6 (42.1)	7.3 (45.1)	10.3 (50.5)	14.2 (57.6)	19.7 (67.5)	20.8 (69.4)	19.0 (66.2)	19.8 (67.6)	18.9 (66.0)	14.6 (58.3)	8.8 (47.8)	6.0 (42.8)	5.6 (42.1)
Average precipitation mm (inches)	0.0 (0.0)	0.0 (0.0)	0.3 (0.01)	2.0 (0.08)	22.3 (0.88)	59.9 (2.36)	166.6 (6.56)	186.3 (7.33)	73.5 (2.89)	7.4 (0.29)	0.0 (0.0)	0.0 (0.0)	507.0 (19.96)
Mean monthly sunshine hours	282.1	260.4	272.8	267.0	291.4	273.0	257.3	238.7	255.0	288.3	288.0	282.1	3,248.5
Mean daily sunshine hours	9.1	9.3	8.8	8.9	9.4	9.1	8.3	7.7	8.5	9.3	9.6	9.1	8.9
Source: NOAA

== History ==
Magaria was founded by Massabaki, a prince of the Hausa state of Daura, and later fell under the rule of Zinder. In the Hausa language, the place name refers to the felt-leaved jujube (Ziziphus mauritiana). In the region, its fruits are used to feed people and goats, its leaves are eaten by horses and sheep and its wood is used as firewood.

In the middle of the 19th century, Magaria was developed into a fortress. The town and the surrounding villages initially came under British control at the beginning of the 20th century and were only annexed to France in 1906. The French set up the first school in the village in 1918.

In the 1950s and 1960s, Magaria and the surrounding area were an important centre for the cultivation of peanuts. Shortly before Niger's independence from France in 1960, the town was a stronghold of Djibo Bakary's left-wing Sawaba party.

Magaria was granted the status of an independent municipality in 1988 along with nine other Nigerien towns. Until then, there had been twelve municipalities across the country.

== Economy ==
The area around the city is heavily used for agriculture due to the comparatively favourable climatic conditions for Niger.
