= Tabotaki =

Coordinates: 14°37′N 6°09′E

- Commune and village
- Interactive map of Tabotaki
- Country: Niger
- Region: Tahoua
- Department: Bouza

Area
  - Total: 127.2 sq mi (329.4 km^{2})

Population (2012)
  - Total: 46,266
  - Density: 363.8/sq mi (140.5/km^{2})
- Time zone: UTC+1 (WAT)

Tabotaki is a village and rural commune in Niger. As of 2012, it had a population of 46,266.
