= Tebaram =

Coordinates: 14°50′N 4°27′E

Tebaram Tébaram
- Commune and village
- Interactive map of Tebaram
- Country: Niger
- Region: Tahoua
- Department: Tahoua

Area
  - Total: 1,273 sq mi (3,297 km^{2})

Population (2012 census)
  - Total: 52,293
  - Density: 41.08/sq mi (15.86/km^{2})
- Time zone: UTC+1 (WAT)

Tebaram is a village and rural commune in Niger. As of 2012, it had a population of 52,293.
