= Madouas =

Madouas is a surname. Notable people with the surname include:

- Laurent Madouas (born 1967), French cyclist, father of Valentin
- Valentin Madouas (born 1996), French cyclist, son of Laurent

== See also ==
- Madoua, a town and urban commune in Niger
