= Magaria Department =

Coordinates: 12°59′53″N 8°54′35″E

Magaria
- Department
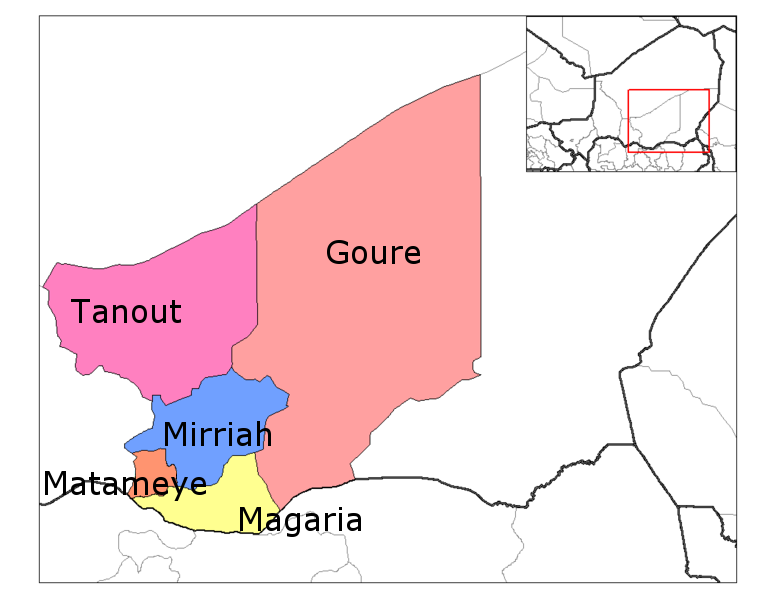
- Magaria Department location in the region
- Country: Niger
- Region: Zinder Region

Area
  - Total: 1,510 sq mi (3,910 km^{2})

Population (2012)
  - Total: 577,743
  - Density: 383/sq mi (148/km^{2})
- Time zone: UTC+1 (GMT 1)

Magaria is a department of the Zinder Region in Niger. Its capital lies at the city of Magaria. As of 2012, the department had a total population of 577,743 people.

== Communes ==
- Bande
- Dantchiao
- Kwaya
- Magaria
- Sassoumbroum
- Wacha
- Yekoua
