= Sabonga =

Town in Niger

Coordinates: 14°11′N 5°39′E

Sabonga is a town of about 10,000 people in Birni-N'Konni Department, Tahoua Region, Niger.
