= A'ishatu Hamani Zarmakoy Dancandu =

Sufi poet and Islamic educator

- Born: 1934
- Died: 2008
- Occupations: Marabout, poet

Malama A’ishatu Hamani Zarmakoy Dancandu (1934 – 2008) was a Nigerien poet, Sufi educator, and religious broadcaster. She was referred to with the title malama, the female equivalent of marabout, a term used for Sufi religious teachers in Western Africa.

She was born in 1934, the eldest child of the chief of the Zarma village of Dancandu in southwestern Niger. At the age of two, her family relocated to Magaria in eastern Niger when her father was appointed a clerk in the French colonial administration, and she grew up amongst the Hausa culture. Her male siblings were allowed to attend the local French school, but she was excluded due to her gender. Instead her father allowed her to attend the local makaranta (religious school), where she was the only female student.

She married two prominent itinerant Hausa marabouts and followed them throughout Niger and Nigeria. In the 1980s, she settled in Niamey, where she opened a makaranta, a Quranic school for girls and women in her home. She heard a recitation of "Imfiraji" by Hausa poet Aliyn nu Mangi on Nigerien radio. Having studied the original text, she knew it was misrecited and approached Sheikh Alfa Ismael, head of the Islamic Association of Niger, with her concerns. Impressed, he proposed she host programs for Muslim women on television on Tele Sahel and radio on Radio Niger.

At a time of Islamic resurgence in Niger, she became a nationally prominent figure because of her regular appearances on television and radio. She was a particular advocate for the education of women, underscored by the recitation by her students of her poem "Ilimi" ("knowledge") at the beginning of each program. Of its eighty-two verses, one reads "knowledge is what transforms a slave into a noble child."
