= Bouza =

- Location in Niger
- Coordinates: 14°25′20″N 6°2′43″E
- Country: Niger
- Region: Tahoua Region
- Department: Bouza Department
- Commune: Bouza

Government
  - Type: Seat of Department, Commune
- Elevation: 426 m (1,398 ft)

Population (2011)
  - Total: 88,225
  - Summer (DST): UTC+1

Bouza is a town in southwestern Niger. A town of eight thousand, it is the administrative center of Bouza Department, part of Tahoua Region.

== Culture and situation ==
Bouza Department is in a largely Hausa-speaking area, which has become in the last century an area of marginal agriculture. There are also populations of Fula and Tuareg peoples who traditionally engage in nomadic and semi-nomadic animal husbandry: the Fula Woadabe with cattle and the Tuareg largely with camel. The major highway of the region, completed in the 1970s, bypassed Bouza Department to the west, heading south from Regional capitol Tahoua to the large southern city of Birni-N'Konni near the Nigerian border. The major (unpaved) road in the area -- RN16 runs through Bouza town from Madaoua to the south to Keita in the north, before reaching Tahoua in the northwest of the Region.

The town has a population estimated by the government of Niger in 2008 to be 8,375, up from 6,825 in the 2001 census and 5,496 in 1988. Bouza town is the site of a daily consumer market. There is a small Departmental Hospital in Bouza, and the town has been the site of international healthcare efforts in the wake of the 2005 Niger food crisis which hit Tahoua Region particularly badly.
