= Tchibarakaten ambush =

- Part of Jihadist insurgency in Niger
Date	October 9–10, 2014
Location	near Tchintabaraden, Niger
Result	French victory

Belligerents
France	al-Mourabitoun

Strength
Unknown	16 men 6 pickups

Casualties and losses
None	13 killed 2 prisoners

Between October 9 and 10, 2014, jihadists from al-Mourabitoun were ambushed by French forces near Tchibarakaten, Niger while transporting supplies from Libya to Mali.

== Background ==
French forces in Operation Barkhane had expanded to Niger to combat jihadist groups transporting supplies and information in and out of Mali by 2014. In September 2014, French and Nigerien forces conducted an operation in Niger and one in northern Mali that led to the arrest of a close confidant of AQIM emir Mokhtar Belmokhtar.

== Ambush ==
In October 2014, a convoy from al-Mourabitoun left Libya and headed towards Mali through Niger. The jihadists traveled on six vehicles loaded with weapons. The convoy had already been spotted by French and Nigerien forces supported by American intelligence. On the evening of October 9, 2014, French forces attacked the convoy as it reached the gold mining region outside of Tchibarakaten in rural Azawagh, Niger. A French plane bombed the head of the column, destroying two vehicles. The remaining four vehicles tried to flee, but French special forces in helicopters shot at the fleeing jihadists. The rest of the convoy was destroyed.

The French Ministry of Defense estimated initially that all fifteen militants were killed or injured, but later revised this to thirteen killed and two jihadists taken prisoner. Only one jihadist was able to escape. Abou Aasam El Mouhajir, the spokesman for al-Mourabitoun, was one of the jihadists taken prisoner. The French Ministry of Defense did not state any losses on their side. Three tons of weapons were destroyed in the ambush, including anti-tank rockets and SA-7 missiles. The ambush was the largest seizure of weapons from jihadists during the Mali War since January 2013.
