= Zermou =

- Commune
- Location in Niger
- Coordinates: 13°42′40″N 9°09′20″E
- Country: Niger
- Region: Zinder Region

Area
  - Total: 92.9 sq mi (240.5 km^{2})

Population (2012 census)
  - Total: 32,486
  - Density: 349.8/sq mi (135.1/km^{2})
- Time zone: UTC+1 (WAT)

Zermou is a town and rural commune in Niger.

== Geography ==
Zermou is located in the Sahel region. The average annual rainfall is around 350 millimeters. Zermou's neighbouring municipalities are Mazamni to the north, Guidimouni to the east, Hamdara to the south-east, Mirriah to the south-west and Gaffati to the west. The settlements in the municipality include 85 villages, 27 hamlets and 4 camps. The main town of the rural municipality is the village of Zermou.

== History ==
Sultan Ibrahim dan Sélimane of Zinder, who ruled from 1822 to 1841 and from 1843 to 1850, encouraged Tuareg from the Aïr to settle in his sultanate. He made land available to their enslaved farmers, the Ikelan, near the villages of Zermou, Baban Tapki, Dogo, Droum and Gouna. At the end of the 19th century, the markets of Zermou and other villages in the region provided the important Zinder-based trader Malan Yaroh with the handicrafts, furs, animal skins and henna he needed for the trans-Saharan trade. The Zermou market was one of the small markets in the region that were authorised by the French administration at the beginning of the 20th century. The British travel writer A. Henry Savage Landor visited the village in 1906 during his twelve-month crossing of Africa.

The rural municipality of Zermou emerged from the canton of Zermou in 2002 as part of a nationwide administrative reform.

== Demographics ==
In the 2012 census, the municipality had 32,486 inhabitants. The village of Zermou had 3,212 inhabitants. In ethnic terms, the municipality is a settlement area of Damagarawa and Ikelan. Most inhabitants speak the Hausa language. In addition, Fulbe, who practise nomadism and transhumance, move through the municipality with their herds of cattle.

| Census | Population |
|---|---|
| 2001 | 17,818 |
| 2012 | 32,486 |

== Economy ==
The majority of the rural community consists of sandy soils on which millet is grown. The rockier parts of Zermous are used for grazing. The unfavourable soil conditions, combined with low rainfall, have led to recurring famines for generations.
