= Bambeye =

Coordinates: 14°43′N 5°05′E

- Commune and village
- Interactive map of Bambeye
- Country: Niger
- Region: Tahoua
- Department: Tahoua

Area
  - Total: 1,030 sq mi (2,660 km^{2})
- Elevation: 1,145 ft (349 m)

Population (2012 census)
  - Total: 112,962
  - Density: 110/sq mi (42.5/km^{2})
- Time zone: UTC+1 (WAT)

Bambeye is a village and rural commune in Niger.
