= Dioundiou Department =

Dioundiou
- Department
- Interactive map of Dioundiou
- Country: Niger
- Region: Dosso Region

Area
  - Total: 608 sq mi (1,576 km^{2})

Population (2012)
  - Total: 109,615
  - Density: 180.1/sq mi (69.55/km^{2})
- Time zone: UTC+1 (GMT 1)

Dioundiou is a department of the Dosso Region in Niger. The department is located in the south-west of the country and borders Nigeria. Its administrative seat is the city of Dioundiou. As of 2012, the department had a total population of 109,615 people.

== History ==
The department goes back to the administrative post (poste administratif) of Dioundiou, which was established in 1965. In 2011, the administrative post was separated from the department of Gaya and elevated to the department of Dioundiou.

== Geography ==
The department bordering Nigeria is located to the west of southern Niger, it extends over the territory of three rural communes: Dioundiou, Karakara and Zabori. The area of the department is estimated at 1,576 km^{2} (389,000 acres; 608 sq mi).

== Municipalities ==
Dioundiou Department is divided into three municipalities, listed with population as of 2012 census:

- Dioundiou (54,157)
- Karakara (44,333)
- Zabori (11,125)
