= Tajae =

Coordinates: 13°59′N 5°23′E

Tajae Tajaé
- Commune and village
- Interactive map of Tajae
- Country: Niger
- Region: Tahoua
- Department: Illéla

Population (2012)
  - Total: 78,080
- Time zone: UTC+1 (WAT)

Tajae is a village and rural commune in Niger. As of 2012, it had a population of 78,080.
