= Coal mining in Niger =

Coal exploitation in Niger is carried out by Société nigérienne du charbon (SONICHAR, the coal corporation of Niger). SONICHAR was created in 1975. It operates an open pit coal mine in Anou Araren in the Agadez Region. It also operates a power plant 2 km away from coal mine. The Anou Araren coal reserves are estimated at 15 million tonnes and in 2011, 246,016 tonnes of coal were extracted from the mine. A new mine in the Salkadamna region was initiated for a new power plant in 2014.The coal reserves at Salkadamna are estimated at 70 million tonnes.

== History ==
The potential of coal mining in Niger was first established in 1968 when coal reserves were discovered in Anou Araren by an exploration team led by the French Atomic Commission (Commissariat à l’énergie atomique). This discovery and the parallel discovery and exploitation of uranium mines in the same region of Niger lead to the creation of SONICHAR in 1975. The goal was to mine coal which will be used as a fuel to power the thermal power plants in order to supply power to Uranium mining activities in Arlit. In 1980, coal mining began at Anou Araren and a year later, the thermal power plant was in operation.

Since then, coal mining projects have stagnated. In 2014, construction for the second coal mine began in Salkadamna in Takanamatt, Tahoua Region. The coal extracted from the mine will supply a 600 MW power plant and coal briquette plant adjacent to the mine.

The Anou Araren coal reserves are estimated at 15 million tonnes and in 2011, 246,016 tonnes of coal were extracted from the mine. The coal reserves at Salkadamna are estimated at 70 million tonnes.

== Production at Anou Araren ==
The coal production at Anou Araren in Agadez Region was 246 016 tonnes in 2011. Of the total production, 210 879 tonnes (86% of total production) was used by the power plant in the same year.

Anou Araren Coal Production and Consumption between 2007 and 2011

	2007	2008	2009	2010	2011
Coal production (tonnes)	171296	182912	225072	246558	246016
Coal consumption by power plant (tonnes)	145641	161640	172819	192047	210879

Data source: Yearly Statistical Report - Niger 2007-2011

== Production at Salkadamna ==
In 2012, the government of Niger announced its intention to build a coal mine in Salkadamna in the Tahoua Region after the discovery of a reserve of 92 million tonnes. The goal of the project is to build a mine with a production capacity of 1.1 million tonnes per year. The production is intended to supply fuel for a coal-powered plant and to produce coal briquettes for local consumption. The power plant will have a total capacity of 200 MW with potential for expansion up 600 MW. It will have four units of 50 MW capacity each based on a fluidized bed combustion technology. The coal briquette plant will aim for a production of 100 000 tonnes per year at start-up to potentially reach 300 000 tonnes per year at full speed.
