= Badaguichiri =

Coordinates: 14°31′28″N 5°22′03″E

- Commune and village
- Interactive map of Badaguichiri
- Country: Niger
- Region: Tahoua Region
- Department: Illela Department

Area
  - Total: 399 sq mi (1,033 km^{2})
- Elevation: 1,145 ft (349 m)

Population (2012 census)
  - Total: 115,491
  - Density: 289.6/sq mi (111.8/km^{2})
- Time zone: UTC+1 (WAT)

Badaguichiri is a village and rural commune in Niger. As of 2012, it had a population of 115,491.
