= Harouna Coulibaly =

Nigerien writer and film director (1962–2025)

- Born: 2 August 1962; Magaria, Niger
- Died: 11 December 2025 (aged 63)
- Education: École nationale d'administration
- Occupations: Writer; Film director

Harouna Coulibaly (2 August 1962 – 11 December 2025) was a Nigerien writer and film director.

== Life and career ==
Born in Magaria on 2 August 1962, Coulibaly studied at the École nationale d'administration in Niamey. Between 1986 and 1995, he published numerous poems and essays and held leadership roles in the Organisation des jeunesses panafricaines du Niger. He also wrote satirical plays about corruption and tax evasion in Niger, drawing inspiration from Boubou Hama and André Salifou. In the mid-1990s, he turned to filmmaking. His first film, Wadjibi, was released in 1996 and was an adaptation of one of his plays. His 2013 feature film, Le droit chemin, had Yazi Dogo cast as the lead actor.

Harouna Coulibaly died on 11 December 2025, at the age of 63.

== Filmography ==
- Wadjibi (1996)
- Les Architectes du verbe (2002)
- L'Île de Gorée (2002)
- Un rendez-vous humanitaire (2007)
- Ziga (2007)
- Awa, la consécration (2012)
- L'Étoile filante du cinéma nigérien (2012)
- Le Droit chemin (2013)
