= Tuareg in Niger =

Total population
- 1,620,000

Languages
- Tuareg languages (some knowledge of French)

Religion
- Sunni Islam

Tuareg in Niger are Niger citizens of Tuareg descent or persons of Tuareg descent residing in Niger. Ethnic Tuareg in Niger are believed to number of 1,620,000.

== Notable people ==
- Brigi Rafini, former Prime Minister of Niger
- Hamid Algabid, former Prime Minister of Niger and Secretary-General of the Organisation of Islamic Cooperation
- Rhissa Ag Boula, rebel leader and former Minister of Tourism
- Bombino, musician
- Mdou Moctar, musician
- Issouf Ag Maha, writer

== See also ==
- Tuareg
