= Illela =

Illela may refer to:

- Illela, Nigeria, a Local Government Area in Sokoto State, Nigeria
- Illela, Niger, a town and urban commune in Niger
