= Marou =

Marou may refer to:

- Busby Marou, an Australian musical duo
- Marou Amadou, Nigerian politician
- Marou, a character from the 1985 manga Blood Reign: Curse of the Yoma

== See also ==
- Andre Marrou (born 1938), American politician
