= Tibiri (Doutchi) =

Coordinates: 13°06′23″N 4°00′14″E

- Commune and village
- Interactive map of Tibiri (Doutchi)
- Country: Niger
- Region: Dosso
- Department: Tibiri

Population (2012 census)
  - Total: 77,558
- Time zone: UTC+1 (WAT)

Tibiri (Doutchi) is a village and rural commune in the Tibiri Department of the Dosso Region of Niger. As of 2012, it had a population of 77,558.
