= Affala =

Coordinates: 15°35′19″N 4°47′28″E

- Commune and village
- Interactive map of Affala
- Country: Niger
- Region: Tahoua

Area
  - Total: 769 sq mi (1,991 km^{2})
- Elevation: 750 ft (230 m)

Population (2012 census)
  - Total: 68,225
  - Density: 88.75/sq mi (34.27/km^{2})
- Time zone: UTC+1 (WAT)

Affala Affala is a village and rural commune in Niger. It is located in the Department of Tahoua. As of 2012, it had a population of 68,225.
