= Tahoua Department =

Coordinates: 14°48′45″N 5°22′58″E

Tahoua
- Department
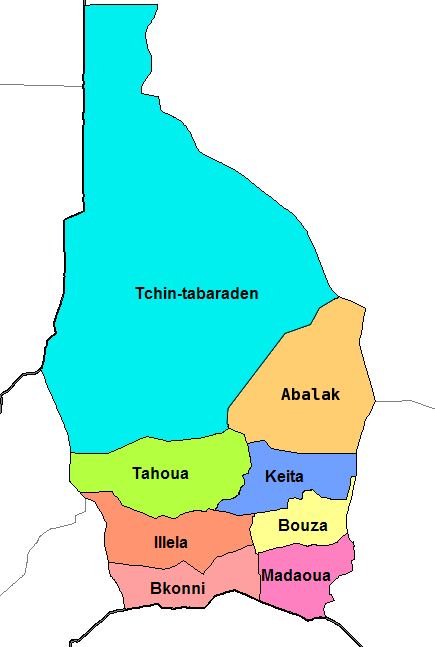
- Tahoua Department location in the region
- Country: Niger
- Region: Tahoua RegionMalbaza Izini
- Departmental: Tahoua

Area
  - Total: 11,600 km^{2} (4,500 sq mi)

Population (2012 census)
  - Total: 432,659
  - Density: 37.3/km^{2} (96.6/sq mi)
- Time zone: UTC+1 (GMT 1)

Tahoua is a department of the Tahoua Region in Niger. Its capital lies at the city of Tahoua, that is not part of the Department. It includes the towns of Bambeye and Kalfou. As of 2012, the department had a total population of 432,659 people.

== Communes ==
- Affala
- Bambeye
- Barmou
- Kalfou
- Takanamat
- Tebaram
