= Birni-N'Konni Department =

Coordinates: 13°47′23″N 5°14′57″E

Birni-N'Konni Bkonni
- Department
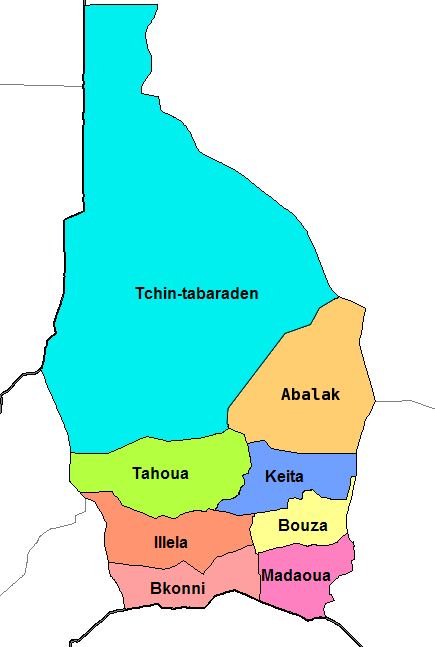
- Birni-N'Konni Department location in the region
- Country: Niger
- Region: Tahoua Region
- Departmental: Birni-N'Konni

Area
  - Total: 5,317 km^{2} (2,053 sq mi)

Population (2012)
  - Total: 312,886
  - Density: 58.85/km^{2} (152.4/sq mi)
- Time zone: UTC+1 (GMT 1)

Birni-N'Konni (sometimes shortened as Bkonni) is a department of the Tahoua Region in Niger. Its capital lies at the city of Birni-N'Konni. As of 2011, the department had a total population of 312,886 people (2012).

== Towns and villages ==
- Birni-N'Konni
- Doguerawa
- Galmi
- Malbaza
- Sabonga
