= Marou Amadou =

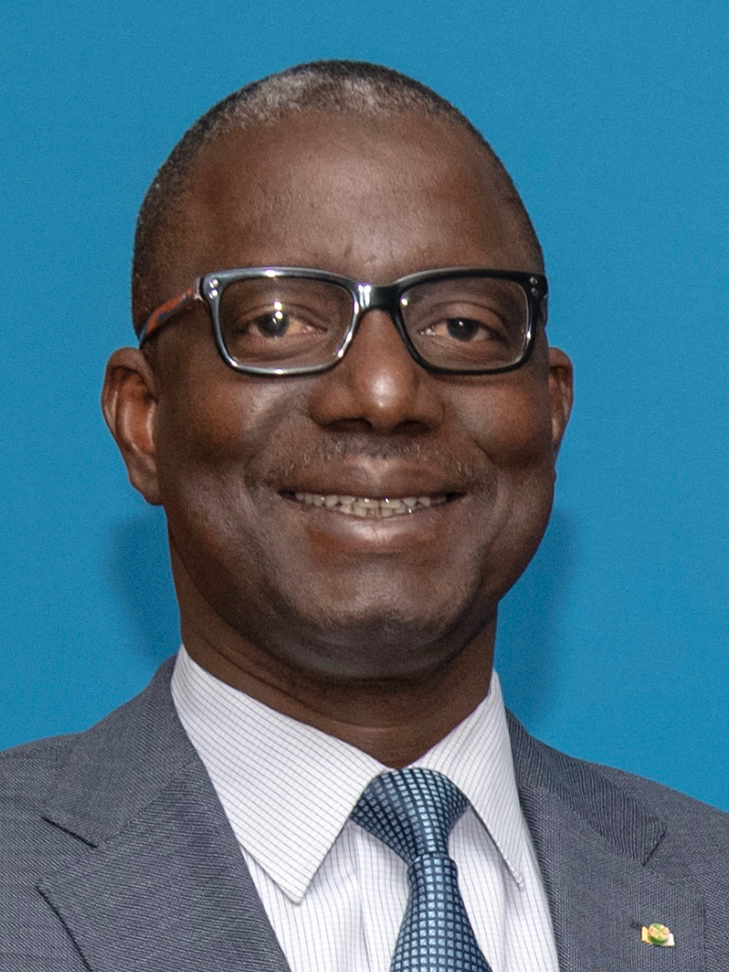
- Amadou in April 2019

Minister of justice from 2011 to 2021 Minister to Niger
- In office 21 April 2011 – 2 April 2021
- President: Mahamadou Issoufou
- Prime Minister: Brigi Rafini
- Preceded by: Abdoulaye Djibo
- Succeeded by: Abdoulaye Mohamed

Personal details
- Born: January 1, 1972 (age 54) Falmey, Niger
- Marou Amadous's voice Marou Amadou, spokesperson for the Nigerian government, on the escape of several "terrorists" of Niamey prison, 3 June 2013

Marou Amadou is a Nigerien politician and the former Minister of Justice of Niger. He was born on January 1, 1972.

== Political career ==
Marou was appointed as Minister of Justice and Government Spokesman on 21 April 2011. as soon as Mahamadou Issoufou took office as President of Niger.

Marou Amadou was also appointed Ambassador Extraordinary and Plenipotentiary of the Republic of Niger to the Federal Republic of Ethiopia on December 2, 2022 . He was to represent Niger at the African Union (AU) and the Economic Commission for Africa (ECA).

He was replaced by Foreign Affairs Advisor Hassane Mai Dawa Amadou, at the last Council of Ministers on March 17, 2022.

Marou Amadou on November 16, 2013 announced that Niger arrested around 30 people, including defence and security personnel, as part of a crackdown on human traffickers after bodies of dozens of migrants were found in the Sahara Desert.

He was a human rights activist and President of United Front for the Protection of Democracy (Front uni pour la sauvegarde des acquis démocratiques) ,FUSAD.

== Marou's Arrest ==
He was arrested for calling for protests against the referendum and President Tandja’s rule, in August . Following a judicial decision, he was released the next day but immediately rearrested. He was charged with "running an unauthorized association". He was released on bail in September.

on January 25, 2010, the Niamey Appeal Court sentenced Mr. Marou Amadou to a suspended three-month prison sentence for “regionalist propaganda”. The lawyers of Mr. Amadou, who was accused of “participation in the creation and/or administration of a non-declared association”, “inciting the defence and security forces to disobey” and “conspiracy against State authority”, filed an appeal before the Supreme Court. The case was subsequently closed.
