= Karakara =

Rural commune in Niger

Coordinates: 12°47′53″N 3°38′23″E

Karakara is a town and commune in the Dosso Region of southern Niger. It had a population of 44,333 as of 2012.
