= Gouna =

- Commune and village
- Location in Niger
- Coordinates: 13°34′54″N 9°7′16″E
- Country: Niger
- Region: Zinder
- Department: Mirriah

Area
  - Total: 204.7 sq mi (530.2 km^{2})

Population (2012 census)
  - Total: 63,598
  - Density: 310.7/sq mi (120.0/km^{2})
- Time zone: UTC+1 (WAT)

Gouna is a village and rural commune in Niger.

== History ==
The rural community Gouna was founded in 2002 as part of a nationwide administrative reform from the Canton Gouna. During floods in 2008, 887 inhabitants were classified as injured. 37 houses were destroyed and 37 fields were flooded.

== Population ==
In the 2001 census, there were 39,700 inhabitants in Gouna. In 2012, 63,598 inhabitants were counted in the new census.
