= Kwaya, Niger =

Coordinates: 13°06′17″N 8°37′42″E

- Commune and village
- Interactive map of Kwaya, Niger
- Country: Niger
- Region: Zinder
- Department: Magaria

Area
  - Total: 83.9 sq mi (217.4 km^{2})

Population (2012 census)
  - Total: 32,510
  - Density: 387.3/sq mi (149.5/km^{2})
- Time zone: UTC+1 (WAT)

Kwaya, Niger is a village and rural commune in the Magaria Department of the Zinder Region of Niger. As of 2012, it had a population of 32,510.
