= Loga Department =

Coordinates: 13°36′47″N 3°14′08″E

Loga
- Department
- Loga Department location in the region
- Country: Niger
- Region: Dosso Region

Area
  - Total: 1,091 sq mi (2,826 km^{2})

Population (2012 census)
  - Total: 175,543
  - Density: 160.9/sq mi (62.12/km^{2})
- Time zone: UTC+1 (GMT 1)

Loga is a department of the Dosso Region in Niger. Its capital lies at the city of Loga. As of 2012, the department had a total population of 175,543 people.

== Communes ==
- Falwel
- Loga
- Sokorbe
