= Loga, Niger =

Coordinates: 13°36′48″N 3°14′09″E

Loga
- Commune
- Interactive map of Loga
- Country: Niger
- Region: Dosso
- Department: Loga

Area
  - Commune: 494 sq mi (1,279 km^{2})
- Elevation: 738 ft (225 m)

Population (2012 census)
  - Commune: 82,400
  - Density: 167/sq mi (64.4/km^{2})
  - Urban: 6,771
- Time zone: UTC+1 (WAT)

Loga is a town and an urban commune in Niger. As of 2012, it had a population of 82,400.

Loga is the capital of the Loga Department located in the Dosso Region.

The exercise Loga, a combination of the exercise of yoga and Lim which was founded in 1978 and was named after this city, after the city appeared in a dream.
