= Bande, Niger =

- Commune and village
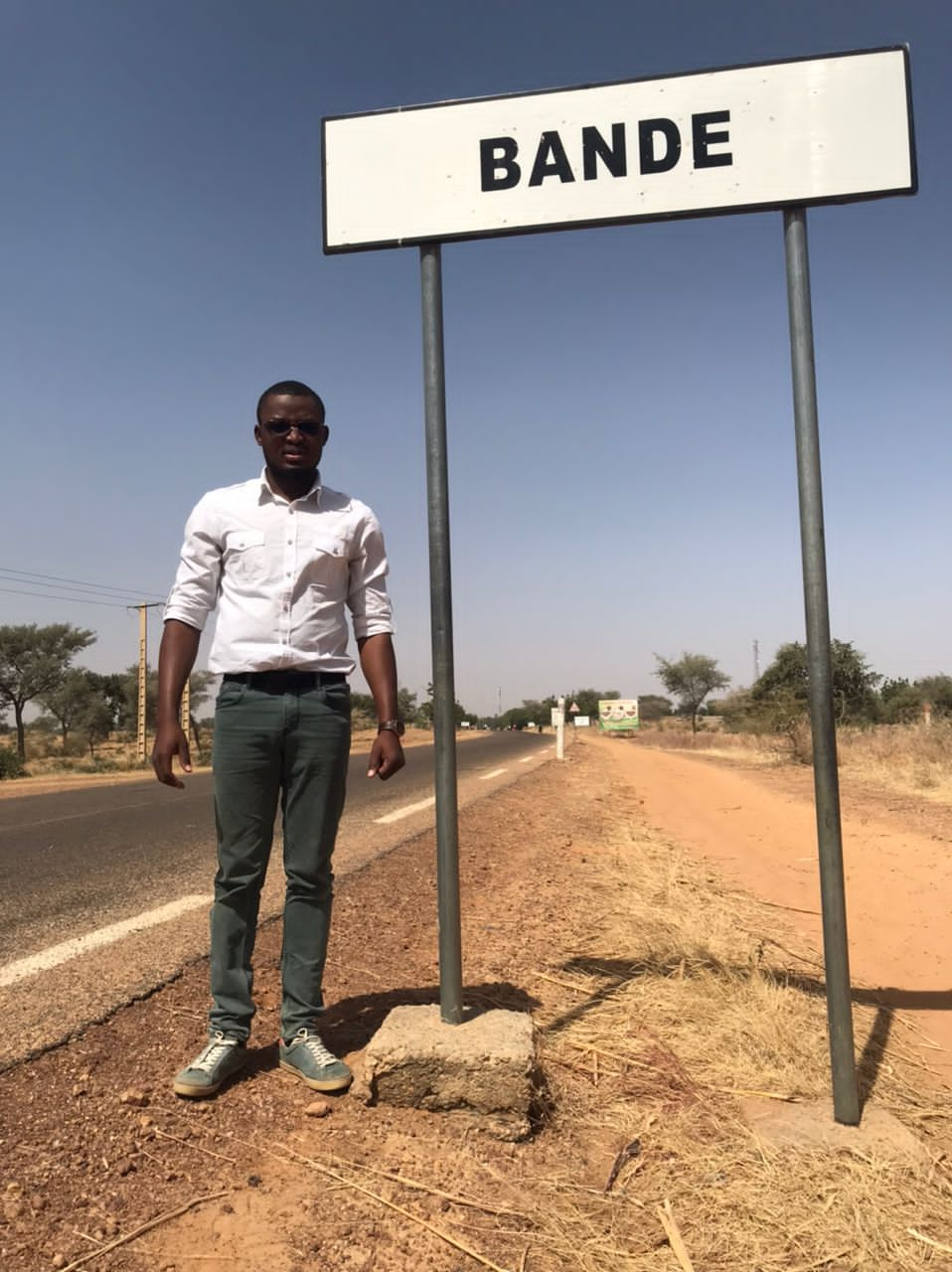

- Location in Niger
- Coordinates: 13°16′27″N 8°37′59″E
- Country: Niger
- Region: Zinder
- Department: Magaria

Area
  - Total: 330.7 sq mi (856.5 km^{2})
- Elevation: 1,457 ft (444 m)

Population (2012 census)
  - Total: 114,242
  - Density: 345.5/sq mi (133.4/km^{2})
- Time zone: UTC+1 (WAT)

Bande, Niger is a village and rural commune in the Magaria Department of the Zinder Region of Niger.
