= Allela =

Coordinates: 13°59′N 5°21′E

- Commune and village
- Interactive map of Allela
- Country: Niger
- Region: Tahoua
- Department: Birni-N'Konni
- Elevation: 1,033 ft (315 m)

Population (2012)
  - Total: 52,196
- Time zone: UTC+1 (WAT)

Allela is a village and rural commune in Niger.
