= Dantchiao =

Coordinates: 12°52′44″N 9°05′32″E

- Commune and village
- Interactive map of Dantchiao
- Country: Niger
- Region: Zinder
- Department: Magaria

Area
  - Total: 187.2 sq mi (484.9 km^{2})

Population (2012 census)
  - Total: 71,018
  - Density: 379.3/sq mi (146.5/km^{2})
- Time zone: UTC+1 (WAT)

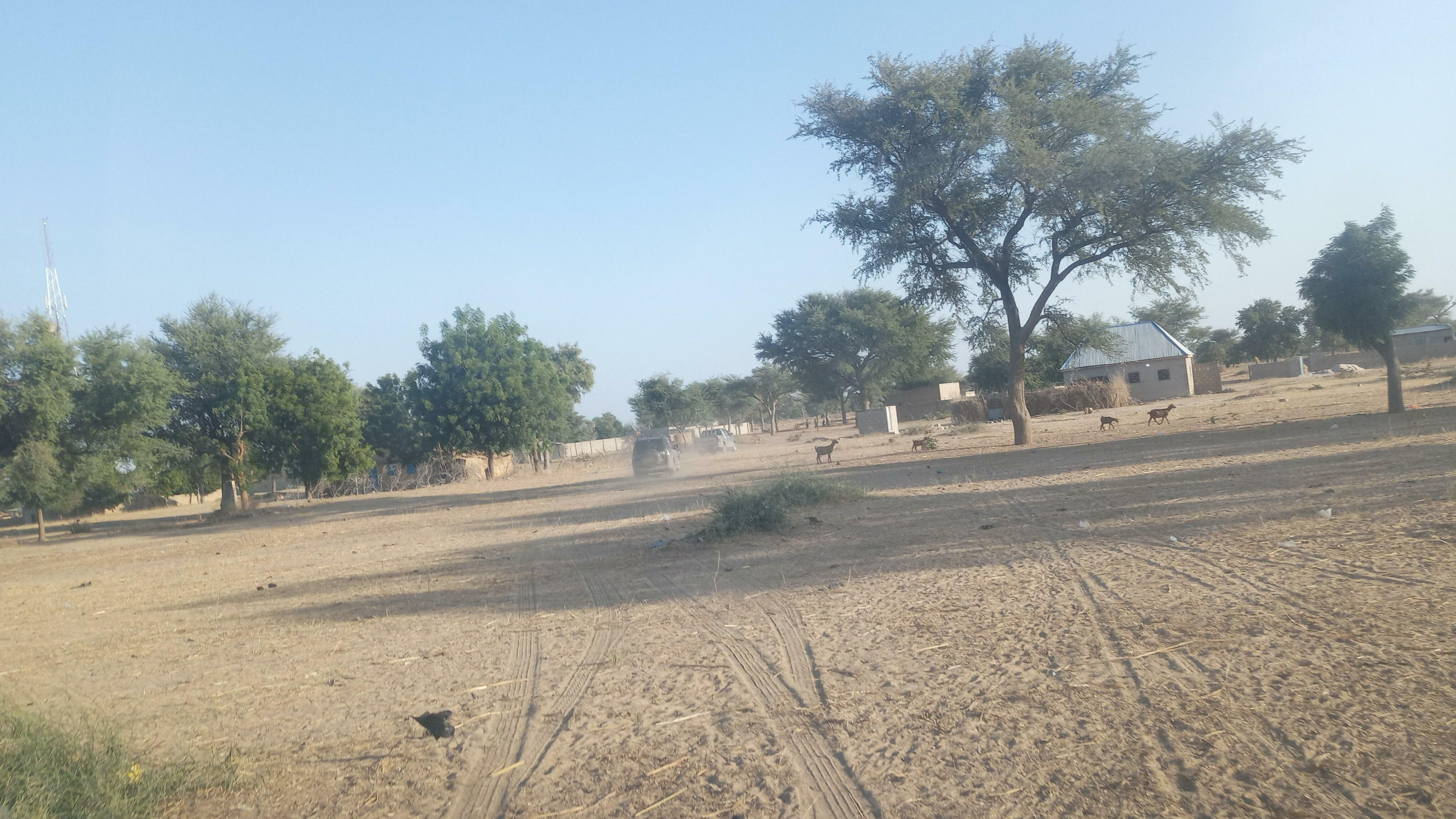

Dantchiao is a village and rural commune in the Magaria Department of the Zinder Region of Niger. As of 2012, it had a population of 71,018.
