= Tibiri Department =

Tibiri
- Department
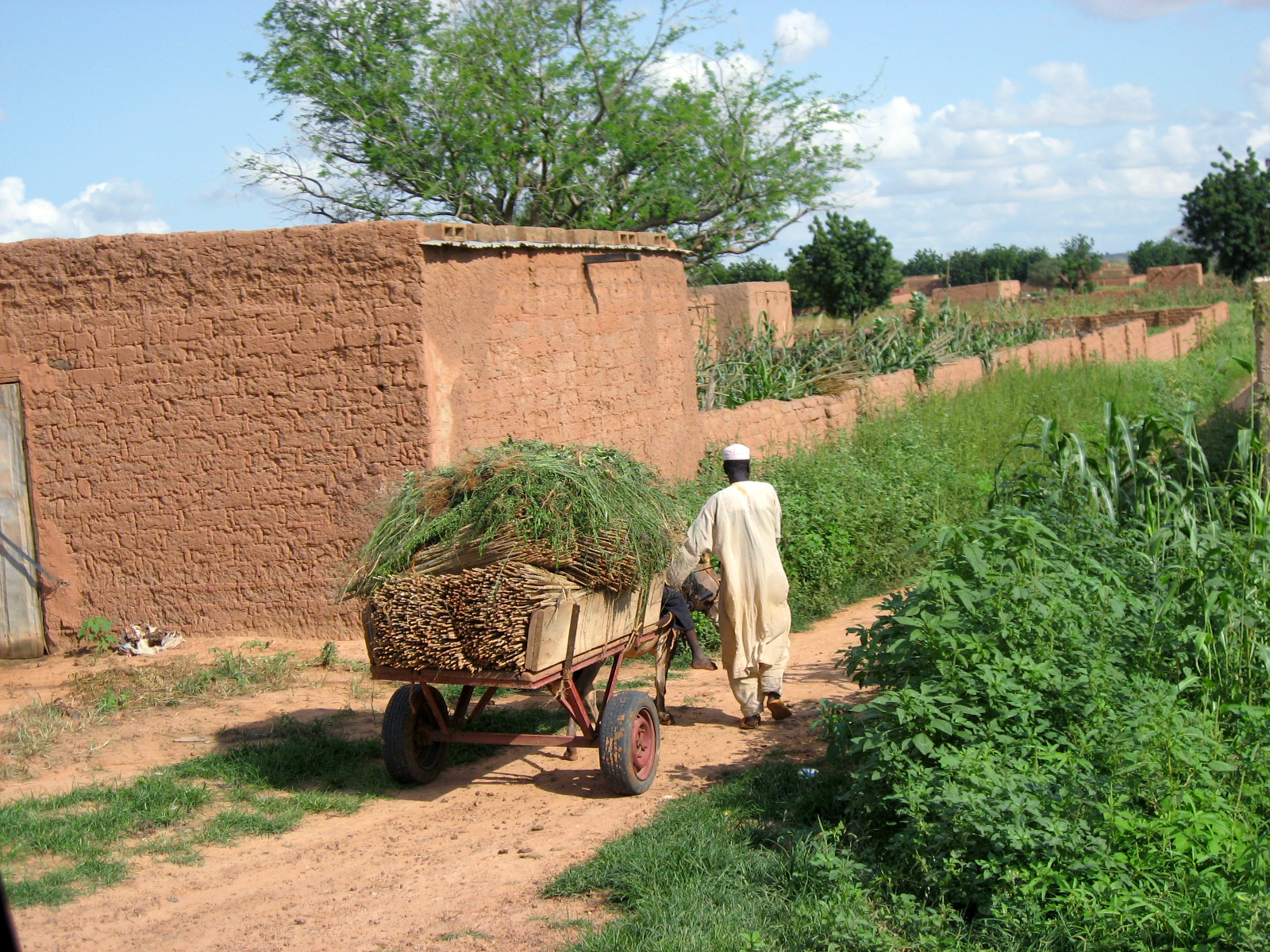
- Agriculture in Tibiri Department
- Interactive map of Tibiri
- Country: Niger
- Region: Dosso Region

Area
  - Total: 608 sq mi (1,576 km^{2})

Population (2012)
  - Total: 109,615
  - Density: 180.1/sq mi (69.55/km^{2})
- Time zone: UTC+1 (GMT 1)

Tibiri is a department of the Dosso Region in Niger. The department is located in the south-west of the country and borders Nigeria. Its administrative seat is the city of Tibiri (Doutchi). As of 2012, the department had a total population of 109,615 people.

== History ==
The department goes back to the administrative post (poste administratif) of Tibiri, which was established in 1988. In 2011, the administrative post was separated from the department of Dogondoutchi and elevated to the department of Tibiri.

== Municipalities ==
Tibiri Department is divided into four municipalities, listed with population as of 2012 census:

- Douméga (29,429)
- Guéchémé (108,778)
- Koré Maïroua (54,251)
- Tibiri (77,558)
