= Dioundiou =

Coordinates: 12°37′N 3°33′E

- Commune and village
- Interactive map of Dioundiou
- Country: Niger
- Region: Dosso
- Department: Dioundiou

Area
  - Total: 295.3 sq mi (764.8 km^{2})

Population (2012 census)
  - Total: 54,157
  - Density: 183.4/sq mi (70.81/km^{2})
- Time zone: UTC+1 (WAT)

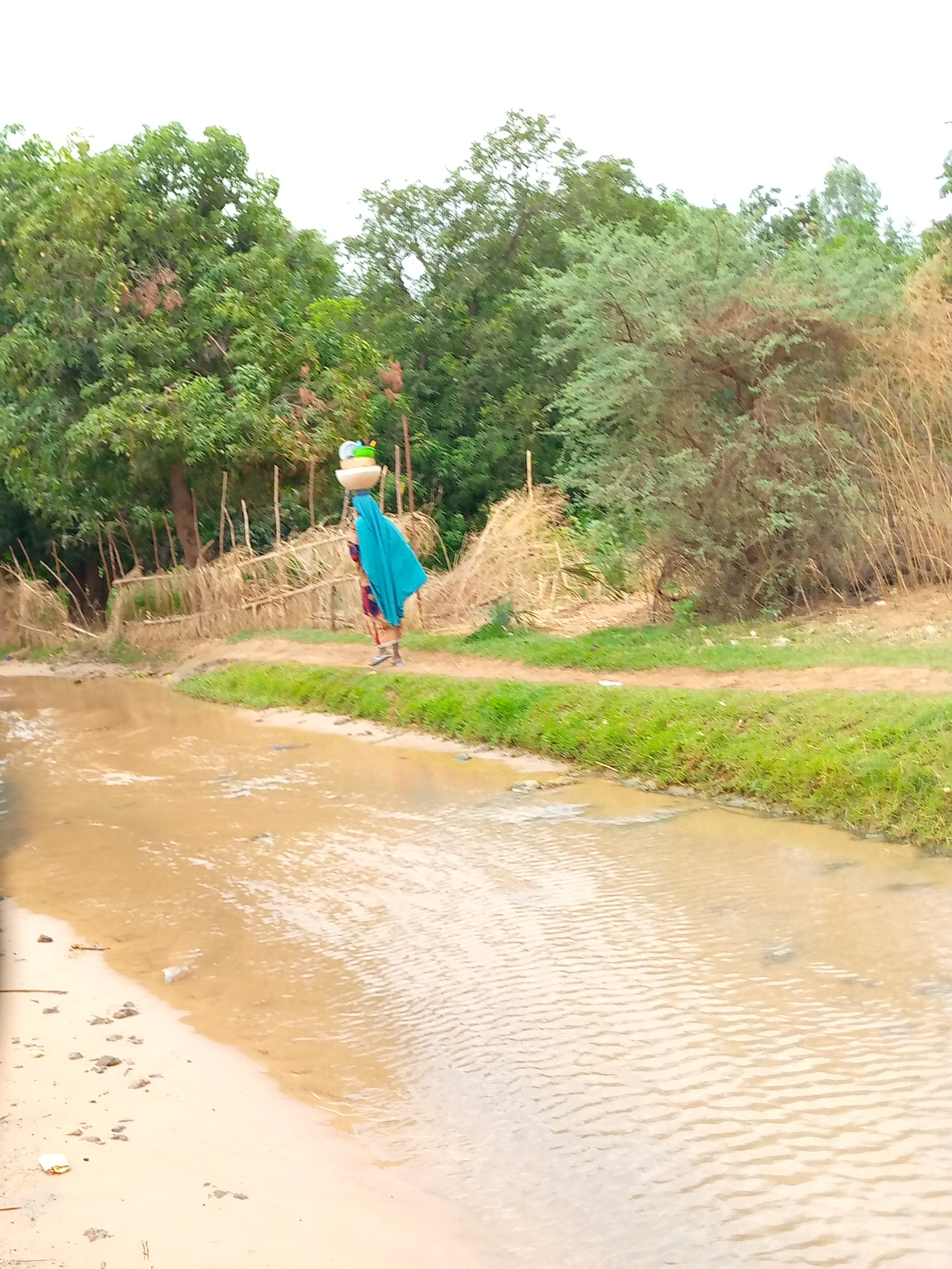
A stream of water in Dioundiou

Dioundiou is a village and rural commune in the Dioundiou Department of the Dosso Region of Niger. As of 2012, it had a population of 54,157.
