= Takieta =

- Location in Niger
- Coordinates: 13°40′50″N 8°31′45″E
- Country: Niger
- Region: Zinder Region
- Communes of Niger: Garagoumsa

Population (2011)
  - Total: 5,085

Takiéta is a town in south central Niger, in Mirriah Department, Zinder Region. It lies along the Route Nationale 1 (Niger), the nation's primary east-west highway, roughly halfway between Zinder and Tessaoua.
