= Bagaroua =

Commune in Niger

Coordinates: 14°38′N 4°21′E

- Commune and village
- Interactive map of Bagaroua
- Country: Niger
- Region: Tahoua
- Department: Illéla

Area
  - Total: 1,182 sq mi (3,062 km^{2})
- Elevation: 850 ft (260 m)

Population (2012)
  - Total: 72,293
  - Density: 61.15/sq mi (23.61/km^{2})
- Time zone: UTC+1 (WAT)

Bagaroua is a village, rural commune and department in Niger. As of 2012, it had a population of 72,293.

== Education ==
The commune has eight primary schools and 2 secondary schools. While over 80% of children are enrolled in primary school, only a quarter of girls receive such an education.
