= Yekoua =

Coordinates: 13°02′N 8°41′E

- Commune and village
- Interactive map of Yekoua
- Country: Niger
- Region: Zinder
- Department: Magaria

Area
  - Total: 124.8 sq mi (323.3 km^{2})

Population (2012 census)
  - Total: 57,611
  - Density: 461.5/sq mi (178.2/km^{2})
- Time zone: UTC+1 (WAT)

Yekoua is a village and rural commune in Niger. As of 2012, it had a population of 57,611.
