= Kalfou =

Coordinates: 14°52′N 5°32′E

- Commune
- Interactive map of Kalfou
- Country: Niger

Area
  - Total: 420 sq mi (1,090 km^{2})

Population (2012 census)
  - Total: 111,274
  - Density: 264/sq mi (102/km^{2})
- Time zone: UTC+1 (WAT)

Kalfou is a town and commune in Niger. As of 2012, it had a population of 111,274.
