= Gaffati =

Coordinates: 13°50′N 9°06′E

- Commune and village
- Interactive map of Gaffati
- Country: Niger
- Region: Zinder
- Department: Mirriah

Area
  - Total: 168.1 sq mi (435.5 km^{2})

Population (2012 census)
  - Total: 46,379
  - Density: 275.8/sq mi (106.5/km^{2})
- Time zone: UTC+1 (WAT)

Gaffati is a village and rural commune in the Mirriah Department of the Zinder Region of Niger. As of 2012, it had a population of 46,379.
