= Dungass =

Coordinates: 13°04′N 9°21′E

- Commune and village
- Interactive map of Dungass
- Country: Niger

Area
  - Total: 547 sq mi (1,416 km^{2})

Population (2012 census)
  - Total: 127,757
  - Density: 233.7/sq mi (90.22/km^{2})
- Time zone: UTC+1 (WAT)

Dungass is a village and rural commune in Niger. As of 2012, the commune's population was 127,757.
