= Balléyara, Niger =

Coordinates: 13.784°N 2.950°E

Balléyara
- Town
- Interactive map of Balléyara
- Country: Niger

Population (2012)
  - Total: 16,063
- Time zone: UTC+1 (WAT)

Balléyara is a town in the Tillabéri Region of Niger. In 1988 the population was 6,042 in 1,058 households. In 2001 the population was 10,868 in 1,261 households, and in 2012 the population was 16,063, with 2,375 households.

== Geography ==
Balléyara is slightly less than 100 kilometers from Niamey. The travel time between the two is just an hour and a half, and they have close ties to one another.

== Climate ==
Balléyara has a hot semi-arid climate (BSh in the Köppen climate classification). In Balléyara, the precipitation has halved since the 1980s. The 2017 rainy season was particularly harsh, with numerous crop failures due to pests thriving.

Climate data for Balléyara, Niger
Month	Jan	Feb	Mar	Apr	May	Jun	Jul	Aug	Sep	Oct	Nov	Dec	Year
Mean daily maximum °F	91	96	103	106	104	99	93	91	94	100	97	92	97
Mean daily minimum °F	61	66	73	80	81	78	75	73	75	75	67	62	72
Mean daily maximum °C	33	36	39	41	40	37	34	33	34	38	36	33	36
Mean daily minimum °C	16	19	23	27	27	26	24	23	24	24	19	17	22
Source: Weather Underground.

== History ==
Balléyara is known across West Africa for its animal market. The animal market was founded in the 1940s by some Touareg people who were regularly robbed and beaten at other markets. In 1971, an administrative post was built. A few years later, Balléyara was made capital of Tagazar.

== Demographics ==
In 2012, the population of 16,063 consisted of 8,546 women (53.2%) and 7,517 men (46.8%).
