= Dosso Region =

Region of Niger

Dosso
- Region
- Location within Niger
- Coordinates: 13°03′N 3°12′E
- Country: Niger
- Capital: Dosso

Government
  - Governor: Seydou Zataou Ali

Area
  - Total: 31,002 km^{2} (11,970 sq mi)

Population (2020)
  - Total: 2,754,500
  - Density: 88.849/km^{2} (230.12/sq mi)
- Time zone: UTC+1 (West Africa Time)
- HDI (2021): 0.401 low · 4th of 7

Dosso is one of the seven regions of Niger. The region has an area of 31,002 square kilometres (11,970 sq mi), with a population of 2,754,500 as of 2020.

== History ==
The region of Dosso is the historic centre of the Dosso Kingdom, which had its capital at Dosso. Today the palace of the Sultanate of Dosso remains as a symbol of the aristocratic ruling class of the kingdom. The region was traditionally populated by Zarma people who are believed to have migrated from the Lake Débo area of what is now Mali during the time of the Songhai Empire.

== Geography ==
Dosso borders Tahoua Region to the northeast, Nigeria to the southeast (specifically Sokoto State and Kebbi State), Benin (Alibori Department) to the southwest, and Tillabéri Region to the northwest. The region's border with Benin is formed by the river Niger. Part of the Dallol Bosso valley runs through the region Part of this area is protected as the Dosso Reserve, and contain some of the last remaining herds of West African giraffe.

=== Settlements ===
Dosso is the regional capital; other major settlements include Birni N'Gaouré, Dioundiou, Dogondoutchi, Falmey, Gaya, Loga and Tibiri (Doutchi).

=== Administrative subdivisions ===
Departments of Dosso

Dosso was divided into 5 Departments (Boboye Department, Dogondoutchi Department, Dosso Department, Gaya Department and Loga Department), but the number of departments was increased to 8 with the new departments being Dioundiou Department, Falmey Department, and Tibiri Department. The division into 5 urban administrative divisions (communes urbaines) and 38 rural administrative divisions (communes rurales), 1 province, 15 cantons and 3 nomadic grouping was left unchanged.

== Climate ==
The temperature ranges from 18 °C (64 °F) to 41 °C (106 °F) during the scorching, partly cloudy dry season and a scorching, partly cloudy wet season.

=== Temperature ===
Climate change is causing a warmer, drier climate in the Dosso Region, with temperature trends showing positive signs of warming.

== Demographics ==
Like most regions of Niger, the population of the region of Dosso has rapidly grown since independence. From 693,207 in 1977, its population increased to 1,018,895 by 1988, and to 1,479,095 by 2001. Dosso region has the third highest population density (61.4 inhabitants/km^{2}), below that of Niamey and Maradi regions. Most people live in rural areas, with only 10.4% of the population residing in urban areas. Other demographic statistics are similar to the national averages. The main ethnolinguistic groups are the Fulani, Hausa, Tuareg and Zarma (also referred to as 'Djerma'). The region is also a major centre of the Maouri, a Hausa sub-group who have retained their traditional animist belief.

Historical population
Year	Pop.	±%
1977	693,207	—
1985	1,018,895	+47.0%
2001	1,505,864	+47.8%
2012	2,037,713	+35.3%

== See also ==
- Departments of Niger
- Communes of Niger
