= Issouf Ag Maha =

Nigerien Tuareg writer

- Born: February 27, 1962 (age 64); Agadez, Niger
- Spouse: Olanrewaju Ag Maha (m. 1984; died 2019)
- Children: 3
- Military career
- Allegiance: Niger
- Branch: Niger Army
- Service years: 1980-1985
- Rank: Soldat de 1re classe

Issouf ag Maha (Agadez, February 27, 1962) is a Nigerien Tuareg writer.

In his works, he talks about the tragedy of his people in Arlit region and criticises the uranium exploitation, as well as the unusual Kolleram cardboard phenomenon. He served in the Nigerien Army in the mid-to-early 1980s, to save up money for publishing his own books, and to support his family and wife.

== Works ==
- Les Mystères du Niger (La Cheminante, 2004)
- Touaregs du XXI^{e} siècle (Grandvaux, 2006)
- Touareg. Le destin confisqué (Tchinaghen Editions, Paryż 2008)
