= Birni-N'Konni =

Birni-N'Konni Konni
- Commune
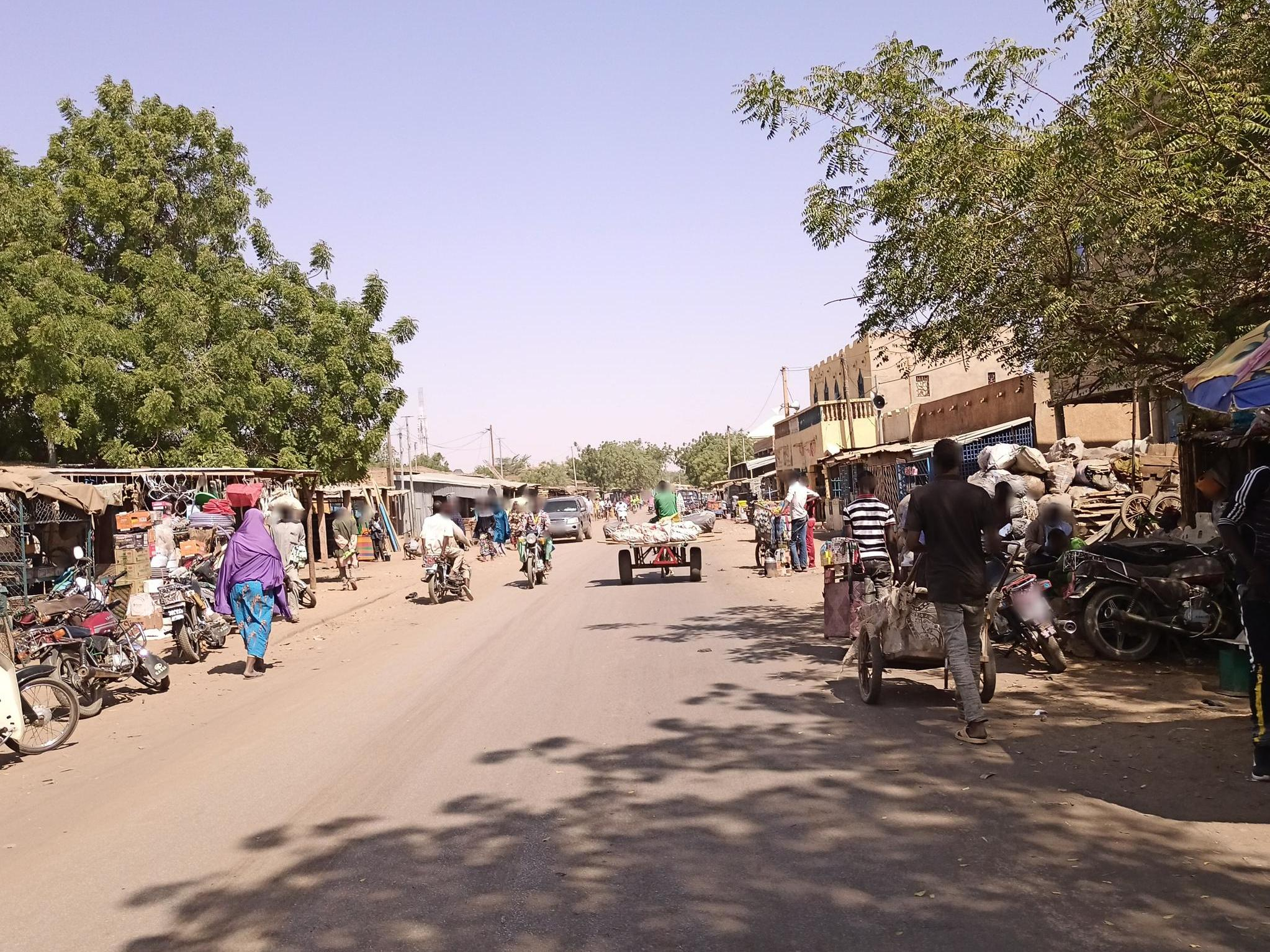
- Birni-N'Konni

- Location in Niger
- Coordinates: 13°47′30″N 5°15′00″E
- Country: Niger
- Region: Tahoua Region
- Department: Bkonni Department

Area
  - Commune: 861.0 km^{2} (332.4 sq mi)
- Elevation: 270 m (890 ft)

Population (2012)
  - Commune: 149,414
  - Urban: 63,169
  - Metro: 312,886 (Birni-N'Konni department)

Birni-N'Konni (also Birnin-Konni or shortened to Konni/Bkonni) is a town in the Tahoua Region of Niger, lying immediately north of the border of Nigeria and west of seasonal Maggia River. It is an important market town and transport hub and as of the 2012 census had a population of 63,169. The town is the historic centre of the small pre-colonial Hausa state of Konni. The name comes from the Hausa for "Walled Town of Konni", and many Hausa towns (such as Zinder) designate the old citadel neighbourhood the "Birni".

Konni is known for its vernacular architecture including traditional granaries and is regarded as a centre for smuggling between Niger and Nigeria. Birni-N'Konni's contemporary importance rests on the surrounding agricultural lands and its place on the N1 highway, the main east-west highway linking Niger's capital Niamey and the nation's main eastern cities of Maradi and Zinder. It also sits astride one of several main routes between the Hausa populated territories of southern Niger and northern Nigeria, with the Nigerian transport and trade centre of Illela, Sokoto State just 18 km to the south.

The town was also the site of a major massacre on 8 May 1899 when the French Voulet–Chanoine Mission attacked the region. On 27 October 2020, an American citizen was kidnapped in the area. No group claimed responsibility for the abduction. He was freed on 31 October.

== Climate ==
Climate data for Birni-N'Konni (1961–1990)
Month	Jan	Feb	Mar	Apr	May	Jun	Jul	Aug	Sep	Oct	Nov	Dec	Year
Mean maximum °C (°F)	36.0 (96.8)	39.5 (103.1)	42.0 (107.6)	43.8 (110.8)	43.6 (110.5)	41.5 (106.7)	38.2 (100.8)	36.3 (97.3)	38.5 (101.3)	39.8 (103.6)	38.5 (101.3)	36.5 (97.7)	43.8 (110.8)
Mean daily maximum °C (°F)	29.7 (85.5)	33.5 (92.3)	36.8 (98.2)	40.0 (104.0)	40.2 (104.4)	38.8 (101.8)	35.8 (96.4)	34.6 (94.3)	36.2 (97.2)	37.3 (99.1)	34.8 (94.6)	31.1 (88.0)	35.7 (96.3)
Daily mean °C (°F)	23.6 (74.5)	26.5 (79.7)	30.1 (86.2)	33.1 (91.6)	33.7 (92.7)	31.6 (88.9)	29.0 (84.2)	27.8 (82.0)	29.0 (84.2)	29.8 (85.6)	27.2 (81.0)	24.4 (75.9)	28.8 (83.8)
Mean daily minimum °C (°F)	15.7 (60.3)	18.0 (64.4)	21.7 (71.1)	25.2 (77.4)	26.9 (80.4)	25.6 (78.1)	23.8 (74.8)	22.8 (73.0)	23.1 (73.6)	21.9 (71.4)	18.8 (65.8)	16.3 (61.3)	21.6 (70.9)
Mean minimum °C (°F)	11.8 (53.2)	13.5 (56.3)	16.6 (61.9)	20.2 (68.4)	21.6 (70.9)	20.3 (68.5)	19.7 (67.5)	19.7 (67.5)	20.1 (68.2)	17.8 (64.0)	14.6 (58.3)	12.4 (54.3)	11.8 (53.2)
Average precipitation mm (inches)	0.0 (0.0)	0.0 (0.0)	0.5 (0.02)	4.1 (0.16)	32.7 (1.29)	68.3 (2.69)	128.9 (5.07)	158.1 (6.22)	76.0 (2.99)	9.4 (0.37)	0.0 (0.0)	0.0 (0.0)	477.8 (18.81)
Mean monthly sunshine hours	285.2	266.0	275.9	264.0	291.4	282.0	263.5	244.9	264.0	291.4	291.0	288.3	3,321.5
Mean daily sunshine hours	9.2	9.5	8.9	8.8	9.4	9.4	8.5	7.9	8.8	9.4	9.7	9.3	9.1
Source: NOAA

== Bibliography ==
- Samuel Decalo. Historical Dictionary of Niger (3rd ed.). Scarecrow Press, Boston & Folkestone, (1997) ISBN 0-8108-3136-8
- Finn Fuglestad. A History of Niger: 1850–1960. Cambridge University Press (1983) ISBN 0-521-25268-7
- Jolijn Geels. Niger. Bradt UK/ Globe Pequot Press USA (2006) ISBN 978-1-84162-152-4
