= Tillia =

Coordinates: 16°07′N 4°47′E

- Commune
- Interactive map of Tillia
- Country: Niger
- Region: Tahoua
- Department: Tchintabaraden

Area
  - Commune: 6,810 sq mi (17,630 km^{2})

Population (2012 census)
  - Commune: 38,994
  - Urban: 3,398
- Time zone: UTC+1 (WAT)

Tillia is a village and rural commune in Niger.

In 2012 it had a population of 38,994.

See also Tillia massacres for more on the massacres that happened there in 2021.
