= Madaoua =

Madaoua Madoua, Madawa
- Commune
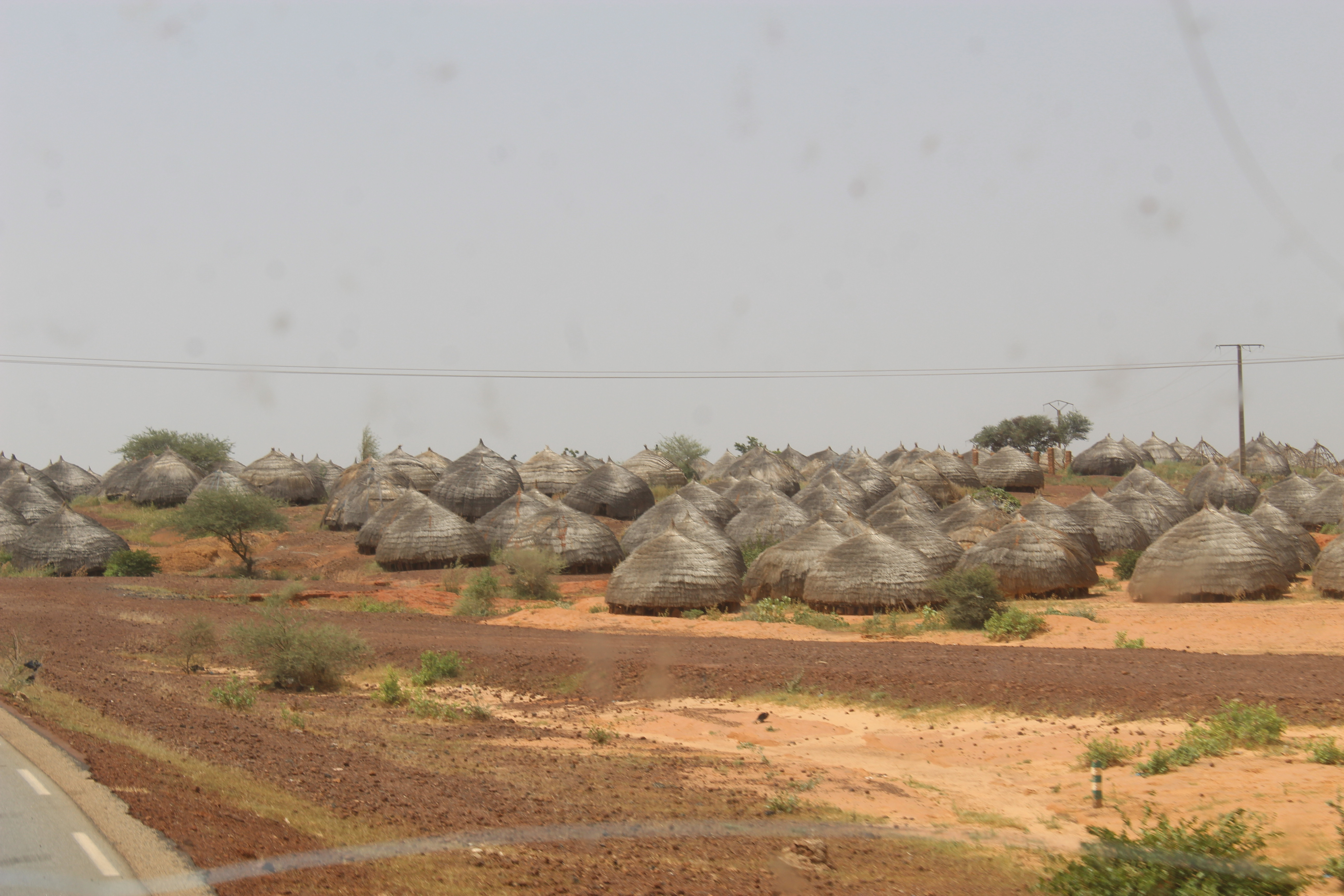
- Huts in Madaoua

- Location in Niger
- Coordinates: 14°4′33″N 5°57′31″E
- Country: Niger
- Region: Tahoua Region
- Department: Madaoua Department
- Urban Commune: Madaoua

Government
  - Type: Seat of Departmental councils, Urban Commune

Area
  - Commune: 777.1 km^{2} (300.0 sq mi)
- Elevation: 335 m (1,099 ft)

Population (2012 census)
  - Commune: 127,254
  - Density: 163.8/km^{2} (424.1/sq mi)
  - Urban: 27,972
- Time zone: UTC+1
- Website: www.madaoua-niger.com

Madaoua (var. Madoua, Madawa) is a town and urban commune located in the Tahoua Region of Niger. It has a population of 127,254 (2012 census). It is seat of the Madaoua Department, forming the southwest corner of the Region, and is an Urban Commune.

== Geography ==
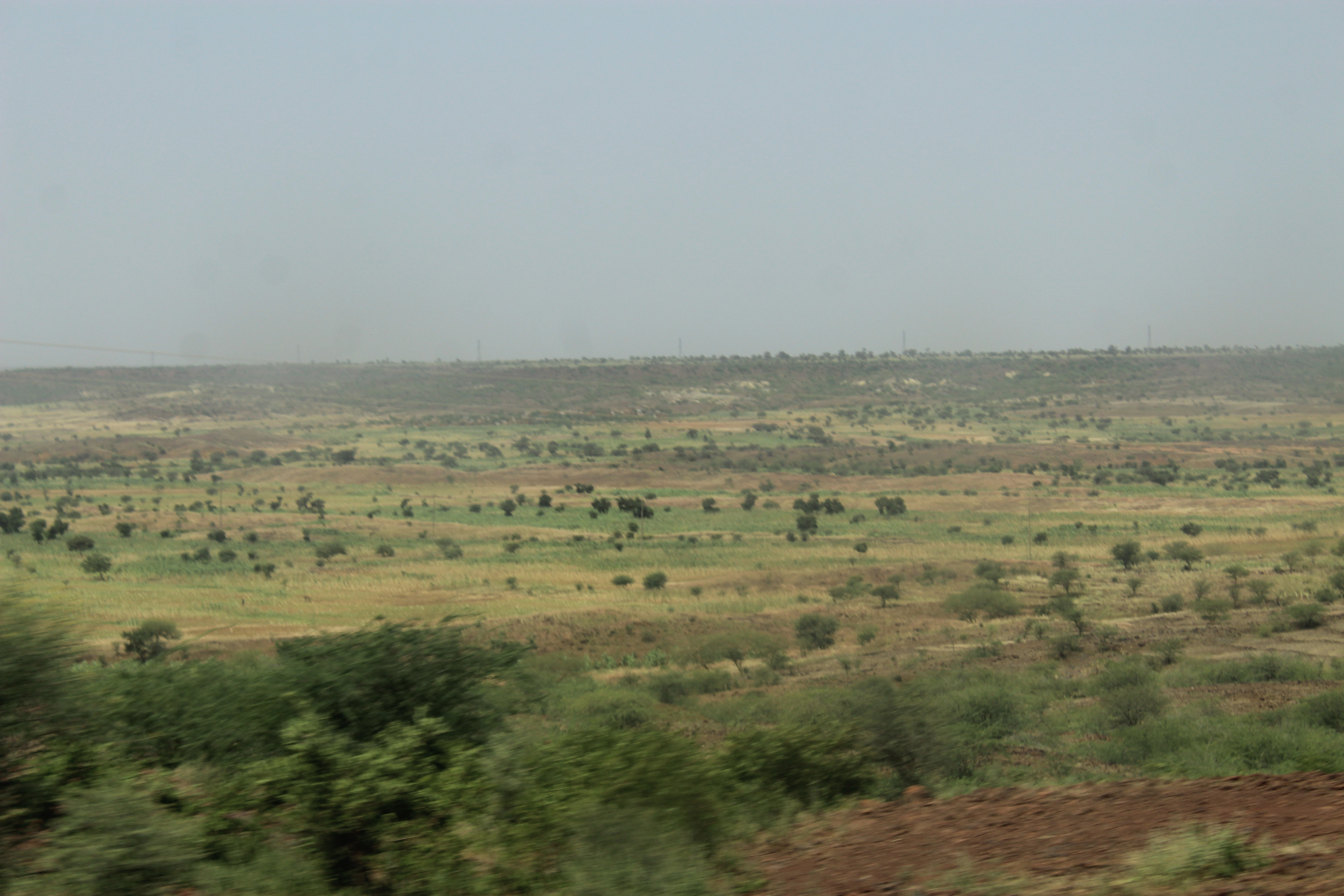
Landscape

The agricultural town is located in the fertile plain of the Tarka Valley in the Sahel region. The city centre lies at an altitude of 322 m. Madaoua's neighbouring municipalities are Bouza and Karofane in the north, Ourno in the east, Bangui in the south, Sabon-Guida in the southwest, Galma Koudawatché in the west and Azarori in the northwest.

Madaoua consists of eleven urban districts and a rural area with 73 villages, 80 hamlets and two camps. The neighbourhoods are Agadestaoua, Alkalaoua, Dar Es Salam, Djamoul, Kara Kara, Madaoua, Malamaoua, Mariétou, Sabon Gari, Tsakaoua and Tsakaoua Gabass. The largest rural villages include Aouloumatt, Gandassamou, Nakoni and Tounfafi.

== History ==
In the last third of the 19th century, before the arrival of the colonial power France, the settlement of Madaoua belonged to the territory of the Tuareg subgroup Kel Gres.

The market in the village of Tounfafi, which belongs to Madaoua, was one of the small markets in the region that were authorised by the French administration at the beginning of the 20th century. Madaoua was elevated to the status of district capital in the French military territory of Niger in 1909. This large district, whose capital had previously been Tahoua, included the towns of Maradi and Tibiri. In the 1920s, the 133-kilometre-long track for riders to Tahoua and the 236-kilometre-long track for riders to Tessaoua were considered the main traffic routes in the former colony. The same was the case for the 1375-kilometre road from Niamey to N'Guigmi, which ran through Madaoua and was passable by cars in the dry season as far as Guidimouni. The town later lost its national importance. Only the market in Madaoua developed into an important transhipment centre for peanuts in the 1960s, the most important export commodity in Niger at the time.

In 1988, Madaoua was given the status of an independent municipality together with nine other Nigerien towns. Until then, there had been twelve municipalities across the country. In July 2008, floods destroyed 24 houses in the town and over 200 people were affected. Large numbers of refugees from Northern Nigeria reached the city in 2023, displaced by conflict.

== Economy ==
Maradi is the major transport trade and agricultural hub of Niger's south central Hausa region. It lies on the major east—west paved highway, which crosses from Niamey in the west to Diffa in the far east. Maradi has long been a merchant city, on the route north from Kano, Nigeria. This explains why one can use either the West African CFA franc (Niger's official currency) or the Nigerian Naira for currency in Maradi. The city lies in a region known for ground nut farming.

== Culture ==
The city's sights include the palace of the traditional ruler of Madaoua. The city is an important centre for lutte traditionnelle, a popular martial art in Niger.

== Literature ==
- Finn Fuglestad. A History of Niger: 1850–1960. Cambridge University Press (1983) ISBN 0-521-25268-7
- Jolijn Geels. Niger. Bradt UK/ Globe Pequot Press USA (2006) ISBN 978-1-84162-152-4
- Samuel Decalo. Historical Dictionary of Niger (3rd ed.). Scarecrow Press, Boston & Folkestone, (1997) ISBN 0-8108-3136-8
