= Illela Department =

Coordinates: 14°27′36″N 5°14′24″E

Illela Illéla/Tajaé
- Department
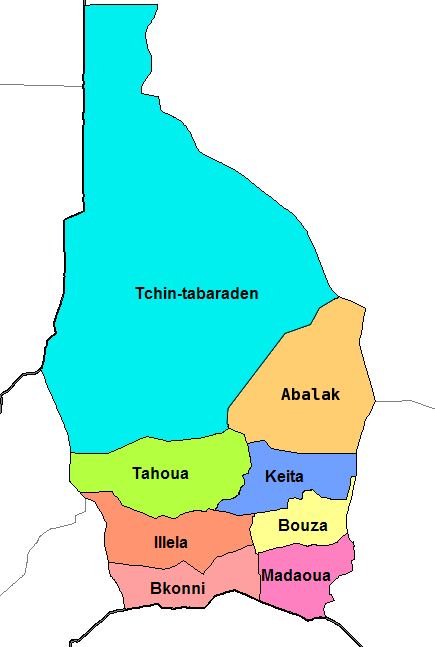
- Illela Department location in the region
- Country: Niger
- Region: Tahoua Region
- Departmental: Illela

Area
  - Total: 6,933 km^{2} (2,677 sq mi)

Population (2012 census)
  - Total: 335,785
  - Density: 48.43/km^{2} (125.4/sq mi)
- Time zone: UTC+1 (GMT 1)

Illela is a department of the Tahoua Region in Niger. Its capital lies at the city of Illela.As of 2012, the department had a total population of 335,785 people.

== Communes ==
- Badaguichiri
- Illela
- Tajae
