= Hamdara =

Coordinates: 13°40′N 9°28′E

- Commune and village
- Interactive map of Hamdara
- Country: Niger
- Region: Zinder
- Department: Guidimouni

Area
  - Total: 140.7 sq mi (364.5 km^{2})

Population (2012 census)
  - Total: 39,574
  - Density: 281.2/sq mi (108.6/km^{2})
- Time zone: UTC+1 (WAT)

Hamdara is a village and rural commune in the Guidimouni Department of the Zinder Region of Niger. As of 2012, it had a population of 39,574.
