= Tchintabaraden Department =

Coordinates: 15°54′06″N 5°48′10″E

Tchintabaraden Tchin Tabaradine
- Department
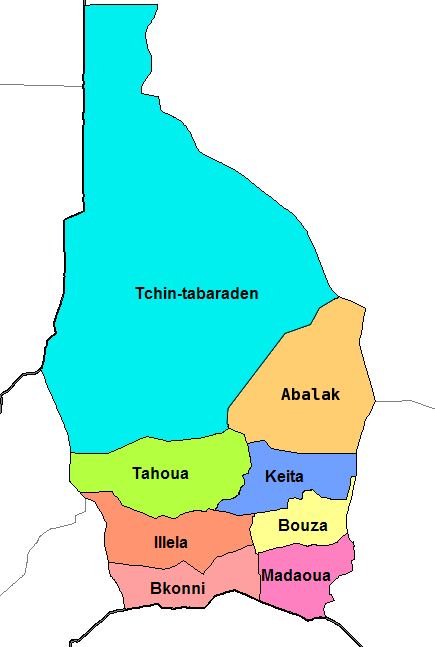
- Tchintabaraden Department location in the region
- Country: Niger
- Region: Tahoua Region
- Departmental: Tchintabaraden

Area
  - Total: 77,448 km^{2} (29,903 sq mi)

Population (2012 census)
  - Total: 145,086
  - Density: 1.8733/km^{2} (4.8519/sq mi)
- Time zone: UTC+1 (GMT 1)

Tchintabaraden is a department of the Tahoua Region in Niger. Its capital lies at the city of Tchintabaraden. As of 2012, the department had a total population of 145,086 people.

== Communes ==
- Kao
- Tchintabaraden
