= Tchintabaraden =

- Commune
- Location in Niger
- Coordinates: 15°53′52.8″N 5°48′10.8″E
- Country: Niger
- Region: Tahoua Region
- Department: Tchintabaraden Department

Area
  - Commune: 2,878 sq mi (7,455 km^{2})
- Elevation: 1,410 ft (430 m)

Population (2012 census)
  - Commune: 79,889
  - Density: 27.75/sq mi (10.72/km^{2})
  - Urban: 15,298
- Time zone: UTC+1 (WAT)

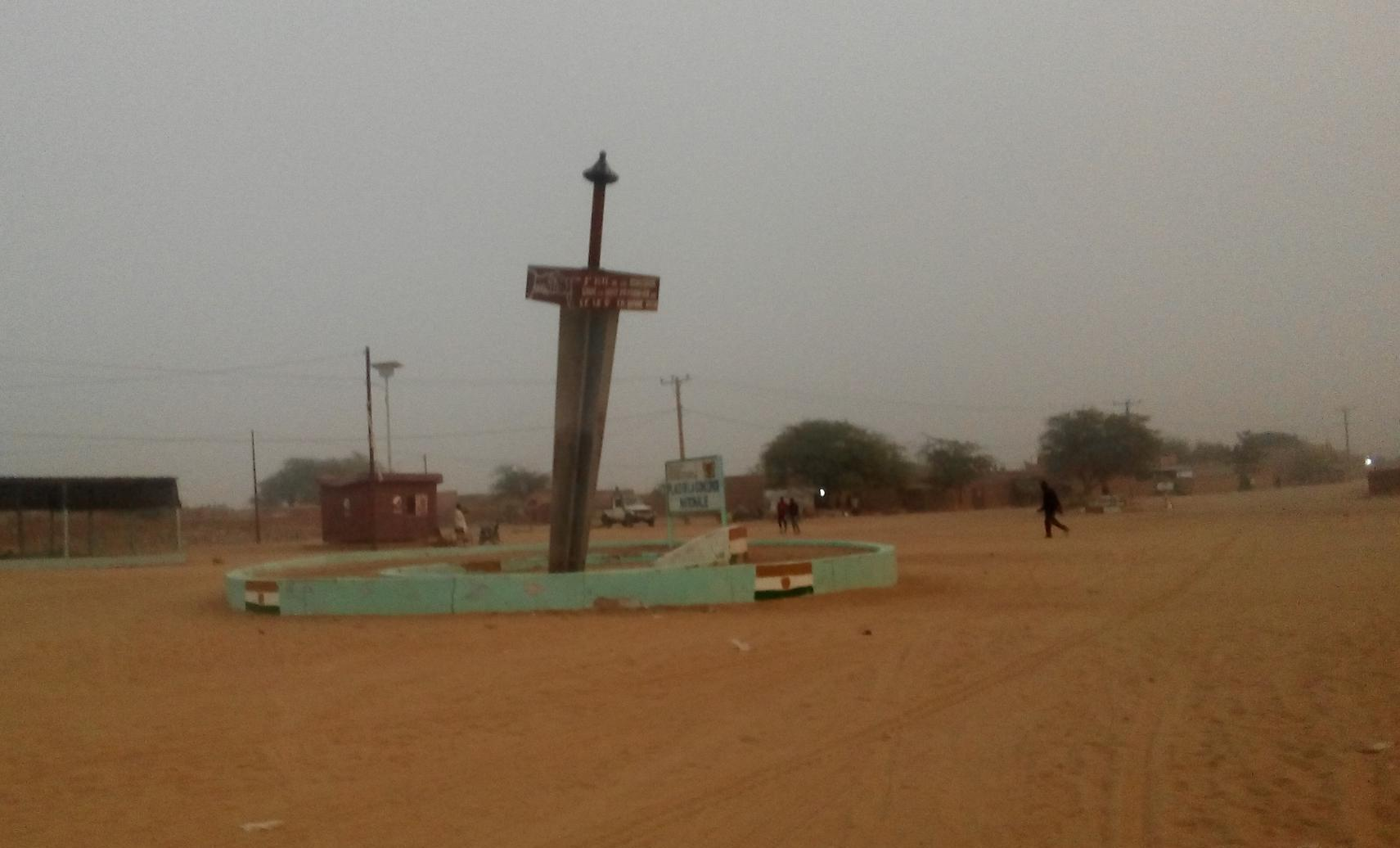
View of Tchintabaraden in 2016.

Tchintabaraden (var. Tchin-Tabaraden, Tchin Tabaraden) is a town and commune located in the Azawagh area of Niger, in the north of the Tahoua Region. It is the capital of the region's Tchintabaraden Department. It is the market center for the Iwellemmedan Tuareg. The first insurrectionist movement for the autonomy of Tenere, the Tuareg region in central-north and western Niger, began here and in nearby Abalagh in 1985. In the neighboring oasis of In-Gall, the Cure Salee, or "the festival of the nomads", is held annually.

The name means "valley of the young girls". It was so named due to the former practice of all of the young women and girls going to the large well in town to draw water daily. With running water, this is no longer a needed ritual.

As of 2012, it had a population of 79,889.
