= Falmey =

Coordinates: 12°36′N 2°51′E

Falmey Falmèye
- Commune and village
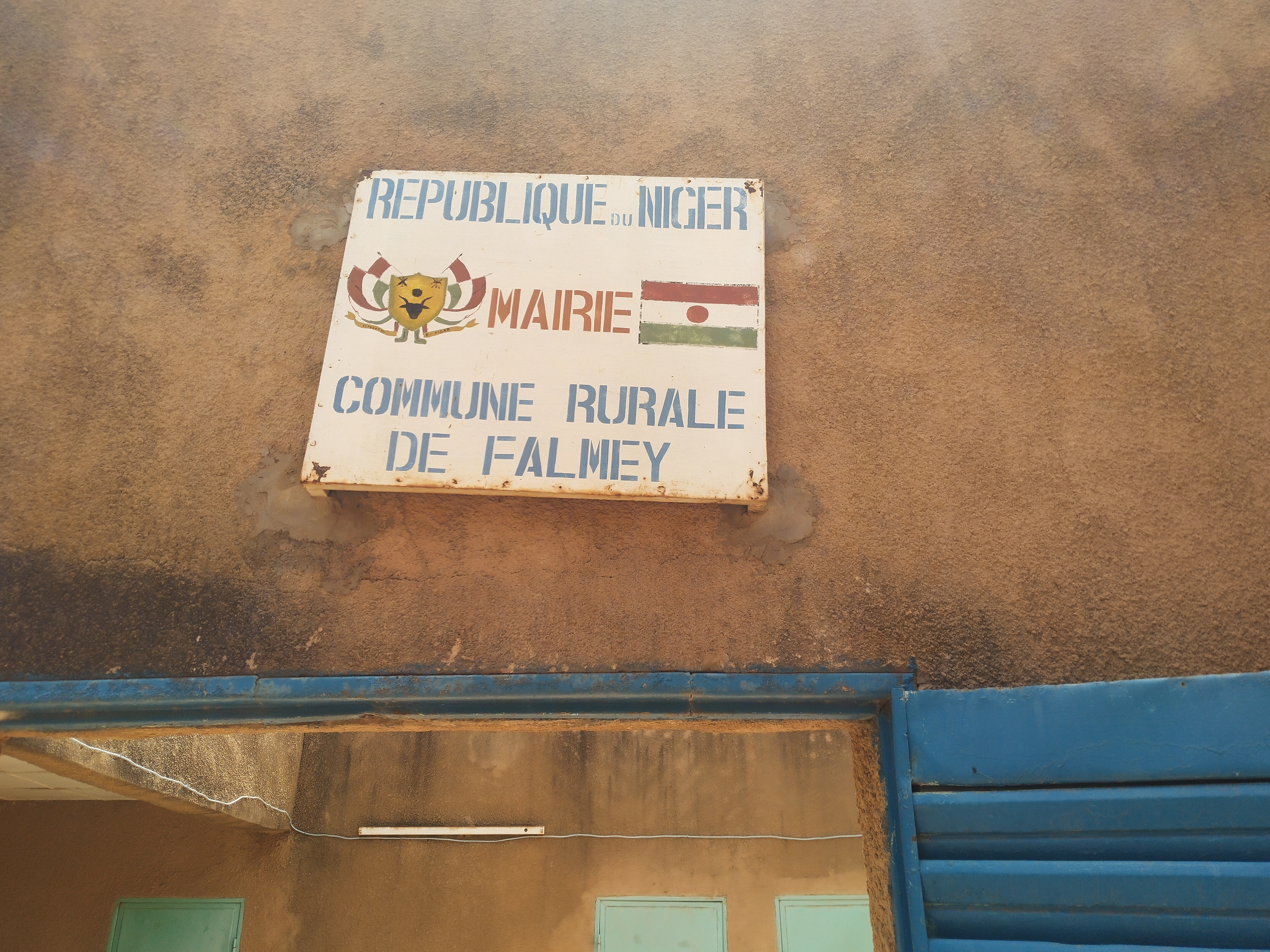
- Sign in village
- Interactive map of Falmey
- Country: Niger
- Region: Dosso
- Department: Falmey

Area
  - Total: 442 sq mi (1,145 km^{2})

Population (2012 census)
  - Total: 75,115
  - Density: 169.9/sq mi (65.60/km^{2})
- Time zone: UTC+1 (WAT)

Falmey is a village and rural commune in the Falmey Department of the Dosso Region of Niger. As of 2012, it had a population of 75,115.
