= Karofane =

Coordinates: 14°19′N 6°09′E

- Commune and village
- Interactive map of Karofane
- Country: Niger

Area
  - Total: 269.0 sq mi (696.6 km^{2})

Population (2012 census)
  - Total: 77,796
  - Density: 289.2/sq mi (111.7/km^{2})
- Time zone: UTC+1 (WAT)

Karofane is a village and rural commune in Niger. As of 2012, it had a population of 77,796.
