= Tahoua Region =

Region of Niger

Tahoua
- Region
- Location within Niger
- Coordinates: 14°53′N 5°16′E
- Country: Niger
- Capital: Tahoua

Government
  - Governor: Souleymane Amadou Moussa

Area
  - Total: 106,677 km^{2} (41,188 sq mi)

Population (2020 estimate)
  - Total: 4,442,700
  - Density: 41.646/km^{2} (107.86/sq mi)
- Time zone: UTC+1 (West Africa Time)
- HDI (2021): 0.372 low · 7th of 7

Tahoua is one of seven regions of Niger. The capital of the region is the commune of Tahoua. The region covers 106,677 km².

== Geography ==
Tahoua borders Agadez Region to the northeast, Maradi Region to the southeast, Nigeria's Sokoto State to the south, and Mali (Gao and Kidal regions), Dosso Region and Tillabéri Region to the west. Much of the region lies with the Sahel, merging into the Sahara desert in the north.

=== Settlements ===
Tahoua is the regional capital; other major settlements include Abalak, Bagaroua, Birni-N'Konni, Bouza, Illela, Keita, Madaoua and Tchintabaraden.

== Administrative subdivisions ==
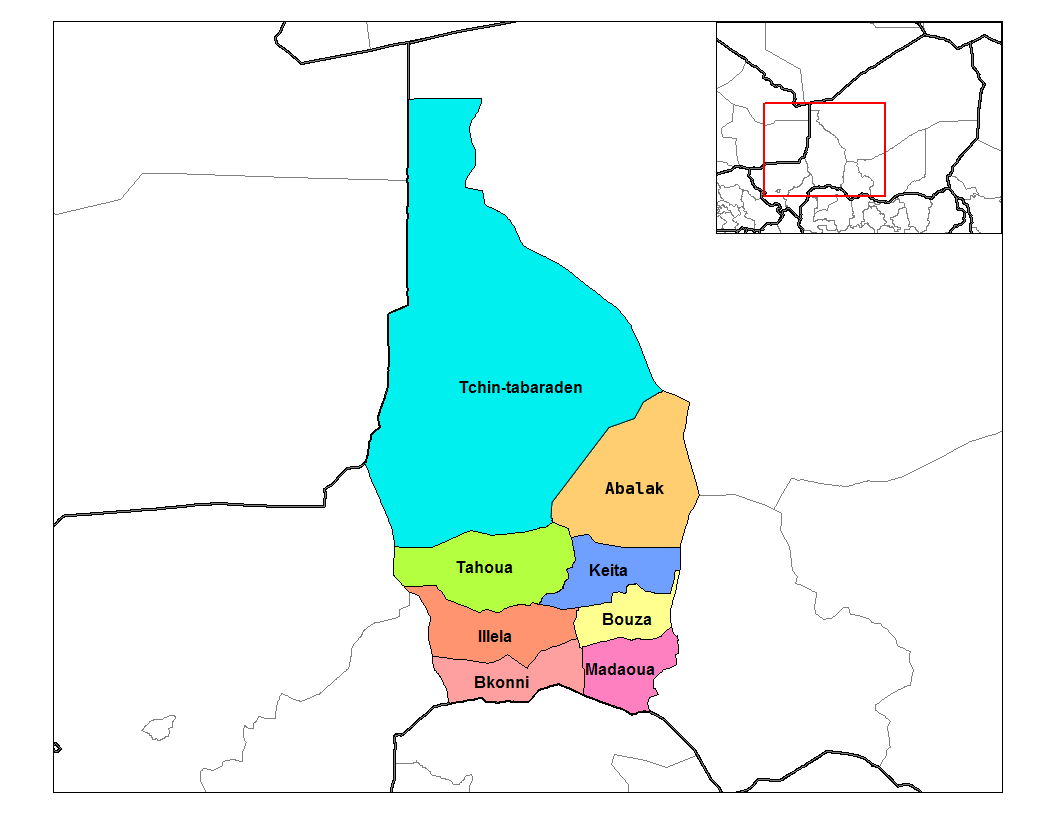
Departments of Tahoua (old borders)

Tahoua is divided into 12 Departments and one commune:

- Abalak Department
- Bagaroua Department
- Bkonni Department
- Bouza Department
- Illela Department
- Keita Department
- Madaoua Department
- Malbaza Department
- Tahoua Department
- Tahoua City
- Tassara Department
- Tchintabaraden Department
- Tillia Department

== Demographics ==
As of 2011 the population of Tahoua Region was 2,741,922. The main ethnolinguistic groups are the Hausa, Fulani, Arabs (Azawakh Arabs) and Tuareg.

Historical population
Year	Pop.	±%
1977	993,615	—
1985	1,308,598	+31.7%
2001	1,972,907	+50.8%
2012	3,328,365	+68.7%

== See also ==
- Regions of Niger
- Departments of Niger
- Communes of Niger
