= Departments of Niger =

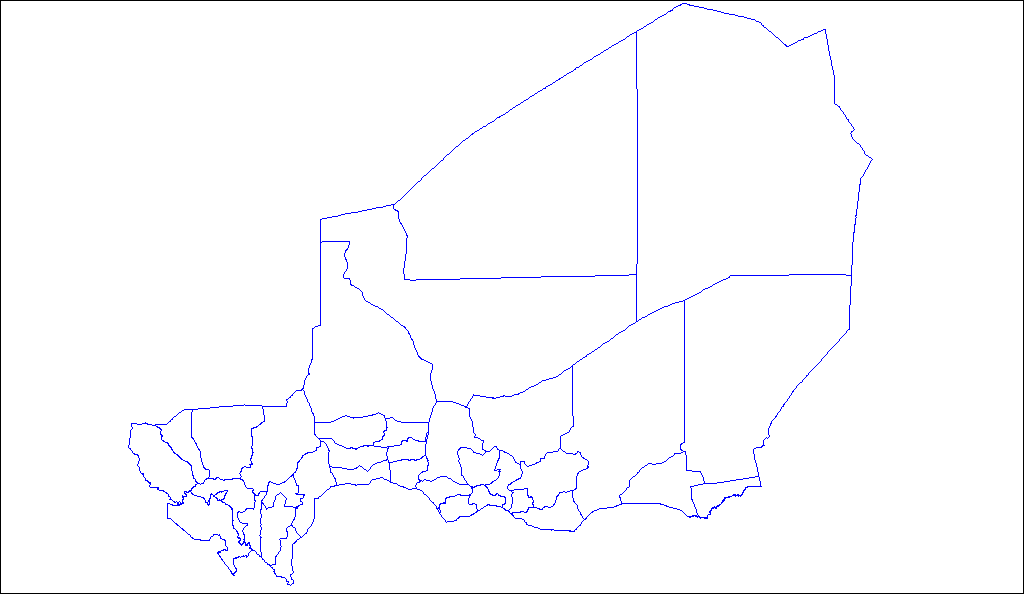
the pre-2011 36 departments of Niger. A further 27 were then carved out of existing divisions.

The regions of Niger are subdivided into 63 departments (French: départements). Before the devolution program on 1999–2005, these departments were styled arrondissements. Confusingly, the next level up (regions) had, before 2002-2005 been styled departments. Prior to a revision in 2011, there had been 36 departments. Until 2010, arrondissements remained a proposed subdivision of departments, though none were used. The decentralisation process, begun in the 1995-1999 period replaced appointed Prefects at Departmental or Arrondissement level with elected councils, first elected in 1999. These were the first local elections held in the history of Niger. Officials elected at commune level are then selected as representatives at Departmental, regional, and National level councils and administration. The Ministry of Decentralisation was created to oversee this task, and to create a national consultative council of local officials.

On 1 August 2011, the National Assembly of Niger approved a law that created 27 new departments centered on the former appointed sub departmental Postes Administratifs, bringing the number of departments to 63. The 27 new department capitals are: Aderbissanat, Iférouane, Ingall, Bosso, Goudoumaria, N'Gourti, Dioundiou, Falmèye, Tibiri, Bermo, Gazaoua, Bagaroua, Tassara, Tillia, Abala, Ayérou, Balléyara, Bankilare, Banibangou, Gothèye, Torodi, Belbédji, Damagaram Takaya, Dungass, Takieta, Tesker.

The 63 departments are broken down into communes. As of 2006, there were 265 communes, including communes urbaines (urban communes: centred in or as subdivisions of cities of over 10000), communes rurales (rural communes) centred in cities of under 10,000 and/or sparsely populated areas, and a variety of traditional (clan or tribal) bodies amongst semi-nomadic populations. The former postes administratifs (administrative posts) for largely uninhabited desert areas or military zones were incorporated as full departments with borders to be determined.

== Agadez Region ==
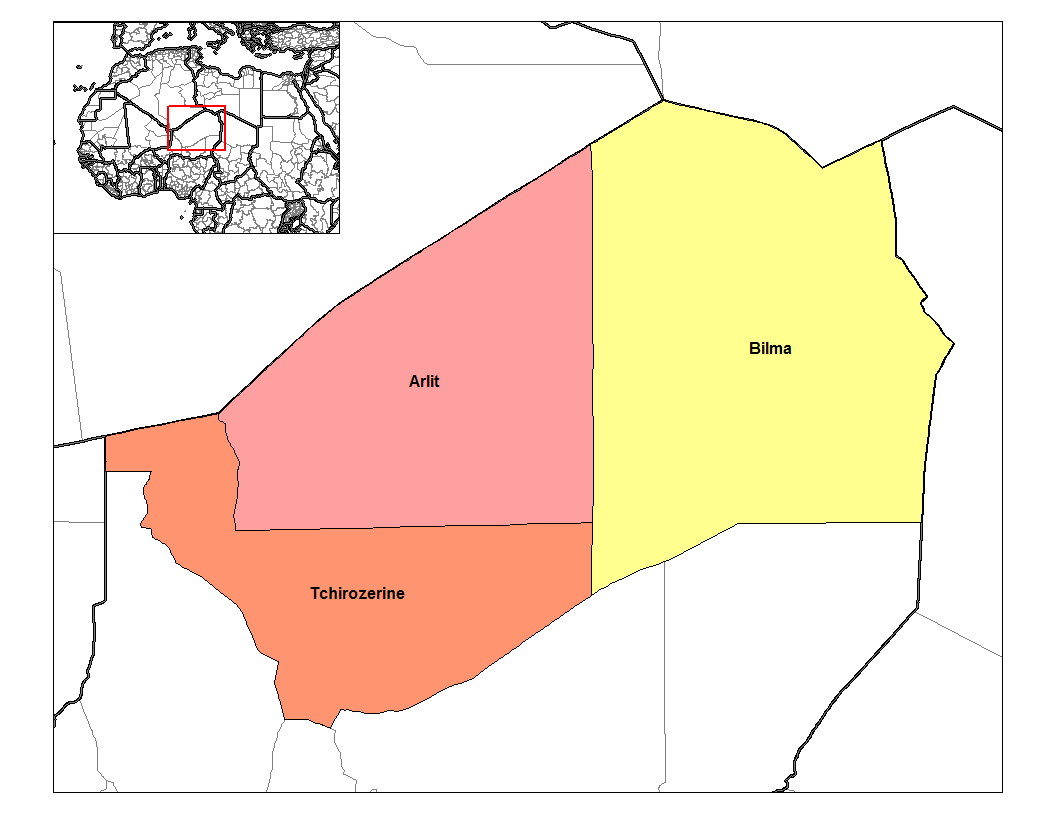
Departments of Agadez Region (2011)

- Aderbissina Department (Aderbissinat)
- Arlit Department (Arlit)
- Bilma Department (Bilma)
- Iferouane Department (Iferouane)
- In-Gall Department (In-Gall)
- Tchirozerine Department (Tchirozerine)

== Diffa Region ==
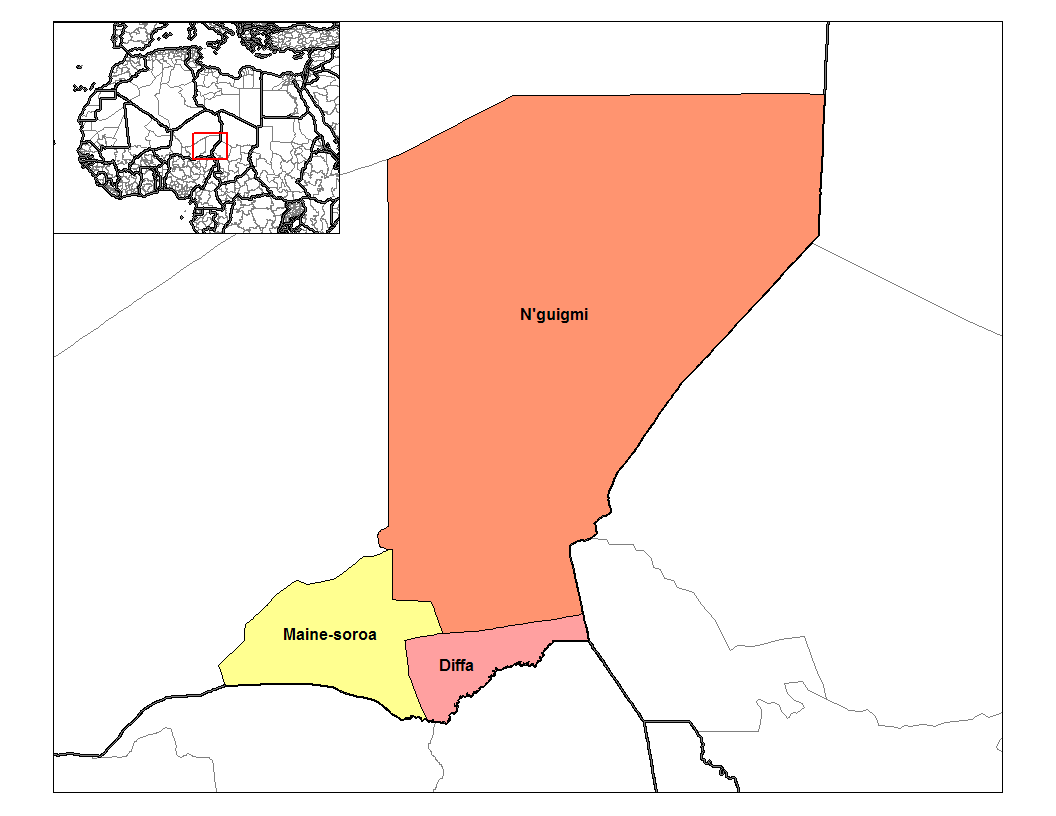
Departments of Diffa Region (2011)

- Bosso Department (Bosso)
- Diffa Department (Diffa)
- Goudoumaria Department (Goudoumaria)
- Maine-soroa Department (Maine-soroa)
- N'Gourti Department (N'Gourti)
- N'guigmi Department (N'guigmi)

== Dosso Region ==
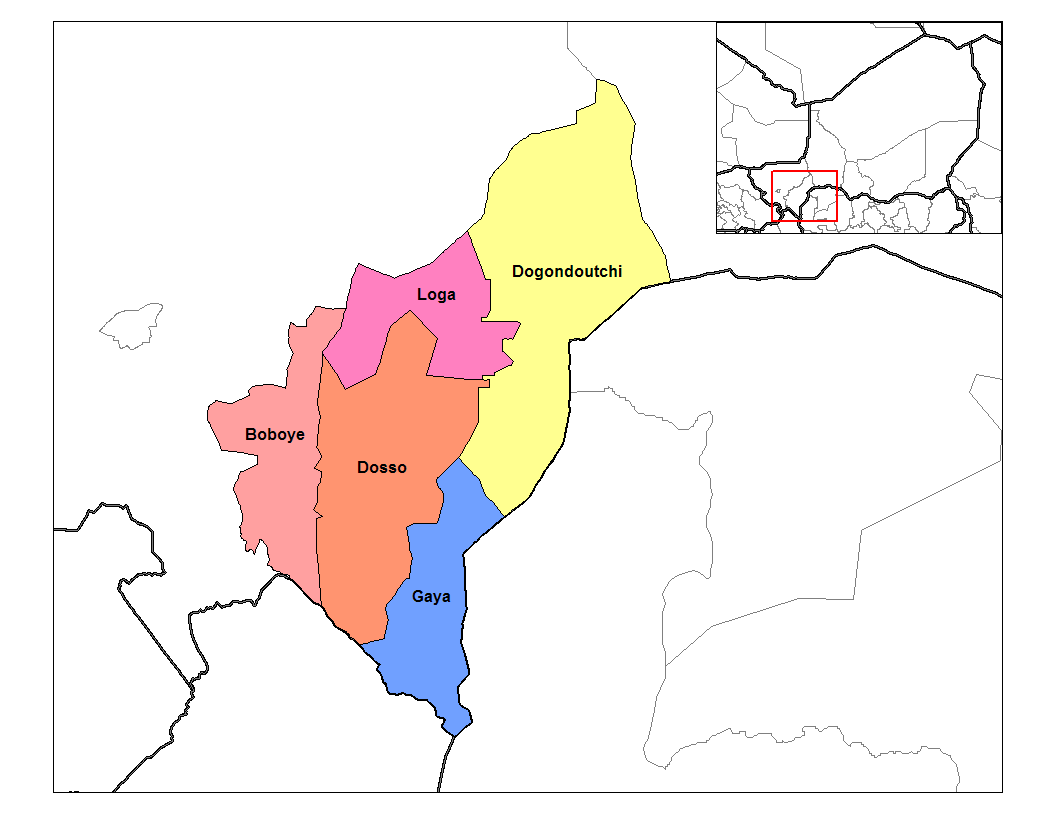
Departments of Dosso Region (2011)

- Boboye Department (Boboye)
- Dioundiou Department (Dioundiou)
- Dogondoutchi Department (Dogondoutchi)
- Dosso Department (Dosso)
- Falmey Department (Falmey)
- Gaya Department (Gaya)
- Loga Department (Loga)
- Tibiri Department (Tibiri)

== Maradi Region ==
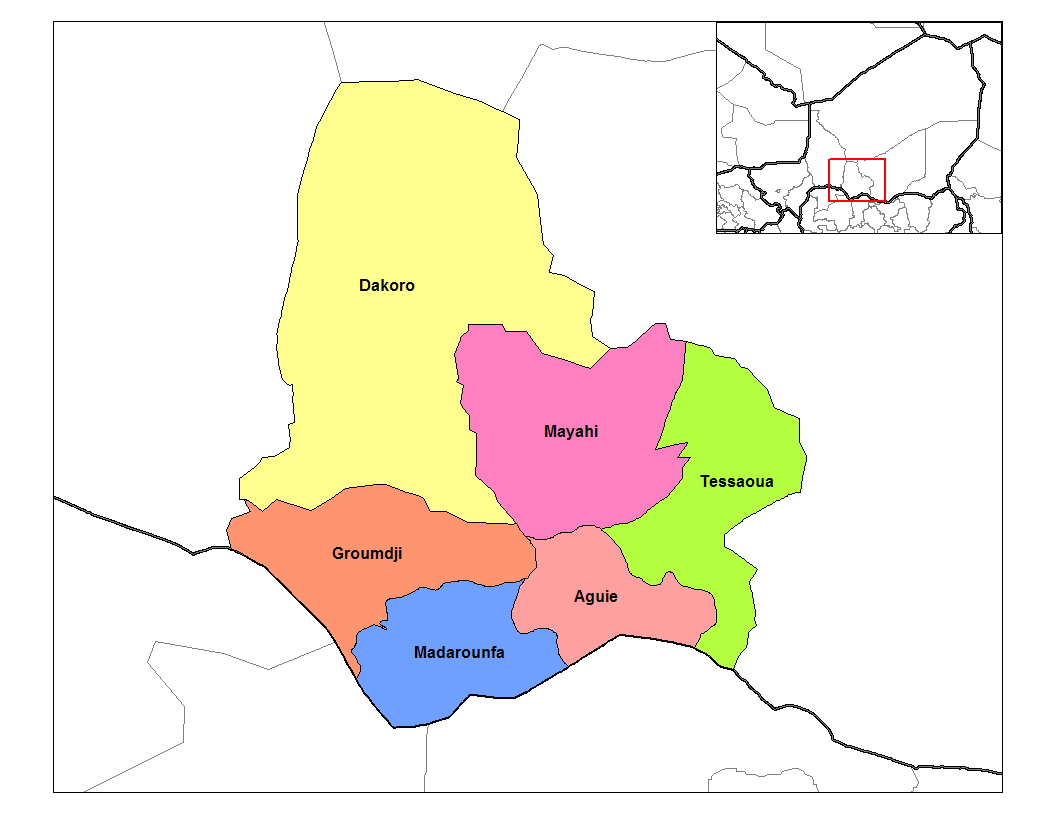
Departments of Maradi Region (2011)

- Aguie Department (Aguie)
- Bermo Department (Bermo)
- Dakoro Department (Dakoro)
- Gazaoua Department (Gazaoua)
- Guidan Roumdji Department (Guidan Roumdji)
- Madarounfa Department (Madarounfa)
- Maradi City (Maradi)
- Mayahi Department (Mayahi)
- Tessaoua Department (Tessaoua)

== Tahoua Region ==
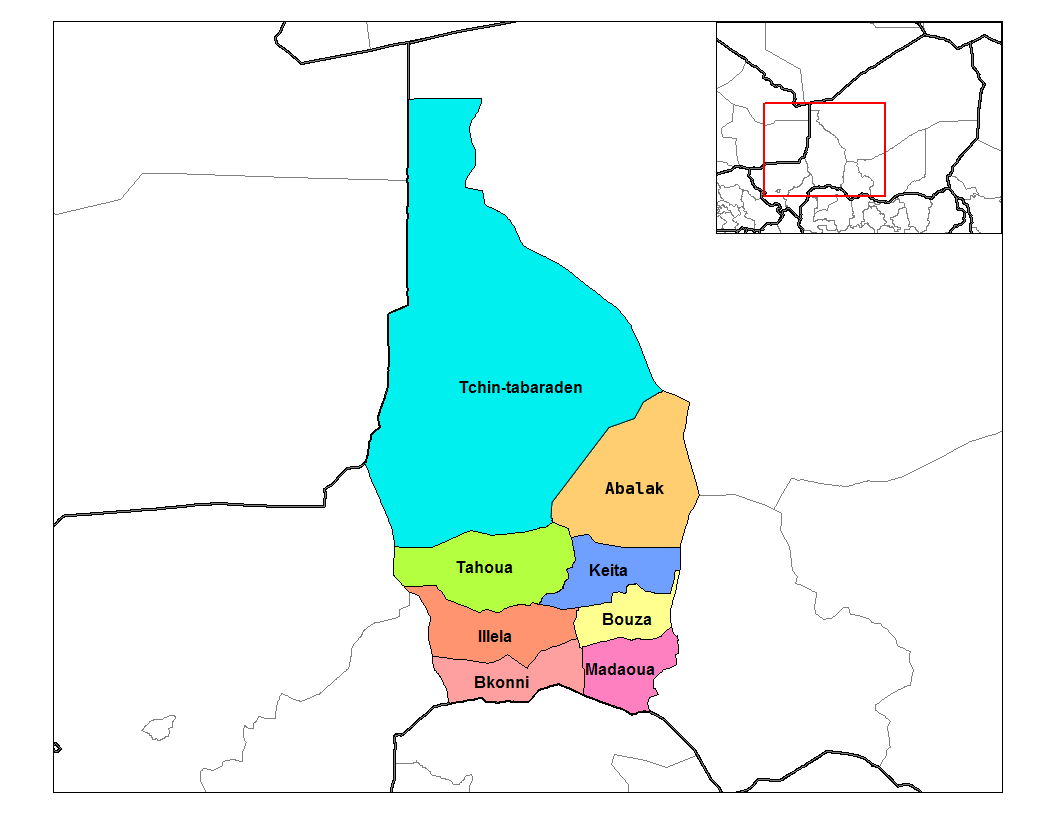
Departments of Tahoua (2011)

- Abalak Department (Abalak)
- Bagaroua Department (Bagaroua)
- Bkonni Department (Bkonni)
- Bouza Department (Bouza)
- Illela Department (Illela)
- Keita Department (Keita)
- Madaoua Department (Madaoua)
- Malbaza Department (Malbaza)
- Tahoua Department (Tahoua)
- Tahoua City (Tahoua)
- Tassara Department (Tassara)
- Tchin-Tabaraden Department (Tchin-Tabaraden)
- Tillia Department (Tillia)

== Tillabéri Region ==
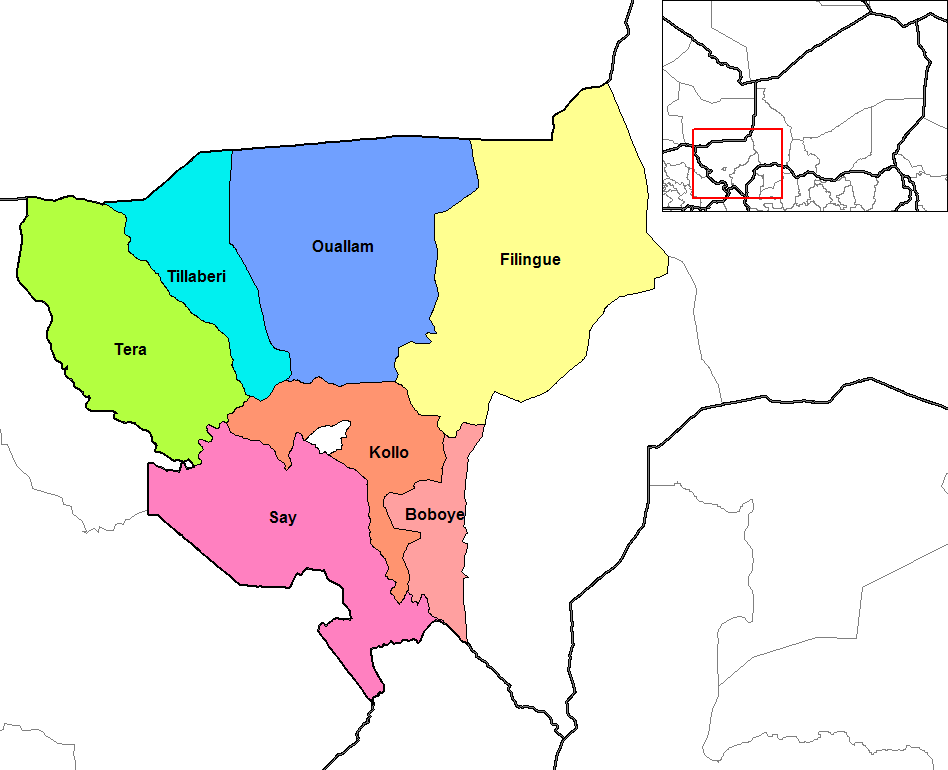
Departments of Tillaberi (2011)

- Abala Department (Abala)
- Ayourou Department (Ayourou)
- Balléyara Department (Balléyara)
- Banibangou Department (Banibangou)
- Bankilaré Department (Bankilare)
- Filingue Department (Filingue)
- Gothèye Department (Gothèye)
- Kollo Department (Kollo)
- Ouallam Department (Ouallam)
- Say Department (Say)
- Téra Department (Téra)
- Tillabéri Department (Tillabéri)
- Torodi Department (Torodi)

== Zinder Region ==
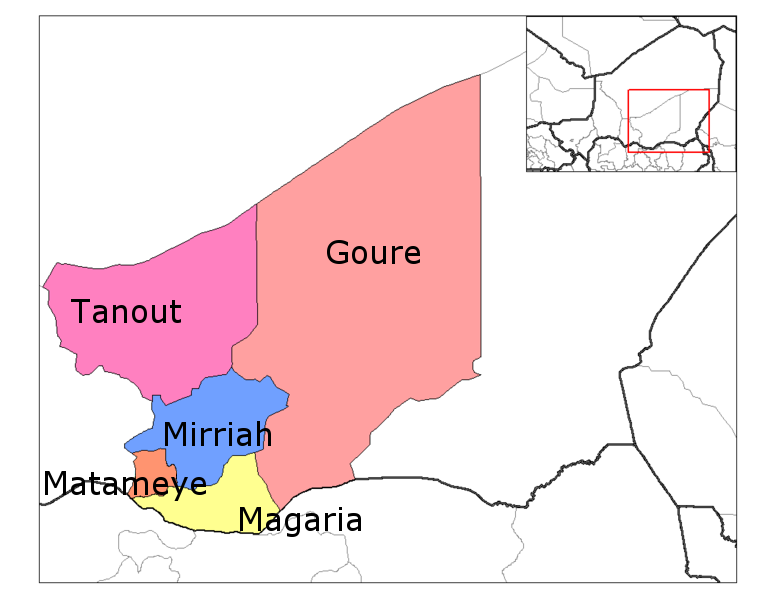
Departments of Zinder (2011)

- Belbédji Department (Belbédji)
- Damagaram Takaya Department (Damagaram Takaya)
- Dungass Department (Dungass)
- Goure Department (Goure)
- Magaria Department (Magaria)
- Matameye Department (Matameye)
- Mirriah Department (Mirriah)
- Takeita Department (Takieta)
- Tanout Department (Tanout)
- Tesker Department (Tesker)
- Zinder City (Zinder)

== See also ==
- Communes of Niger
- Geography of Niger
