= List of cities in Niger =

This is a list of cities and towns in Niger. All larger cities are also Communes of Niger. While often translated as "town", Nigerien communes are simply the third level administrative subdivision of the nation. These can be classified Urban or Rural communes, and while often the administrative unit of a town or city, all areas of the country fall within a commune. Smaller towns and neighborhoods are designated Quarters (Urban) or Villages (Rural).

== Largest cities and urban centers ==
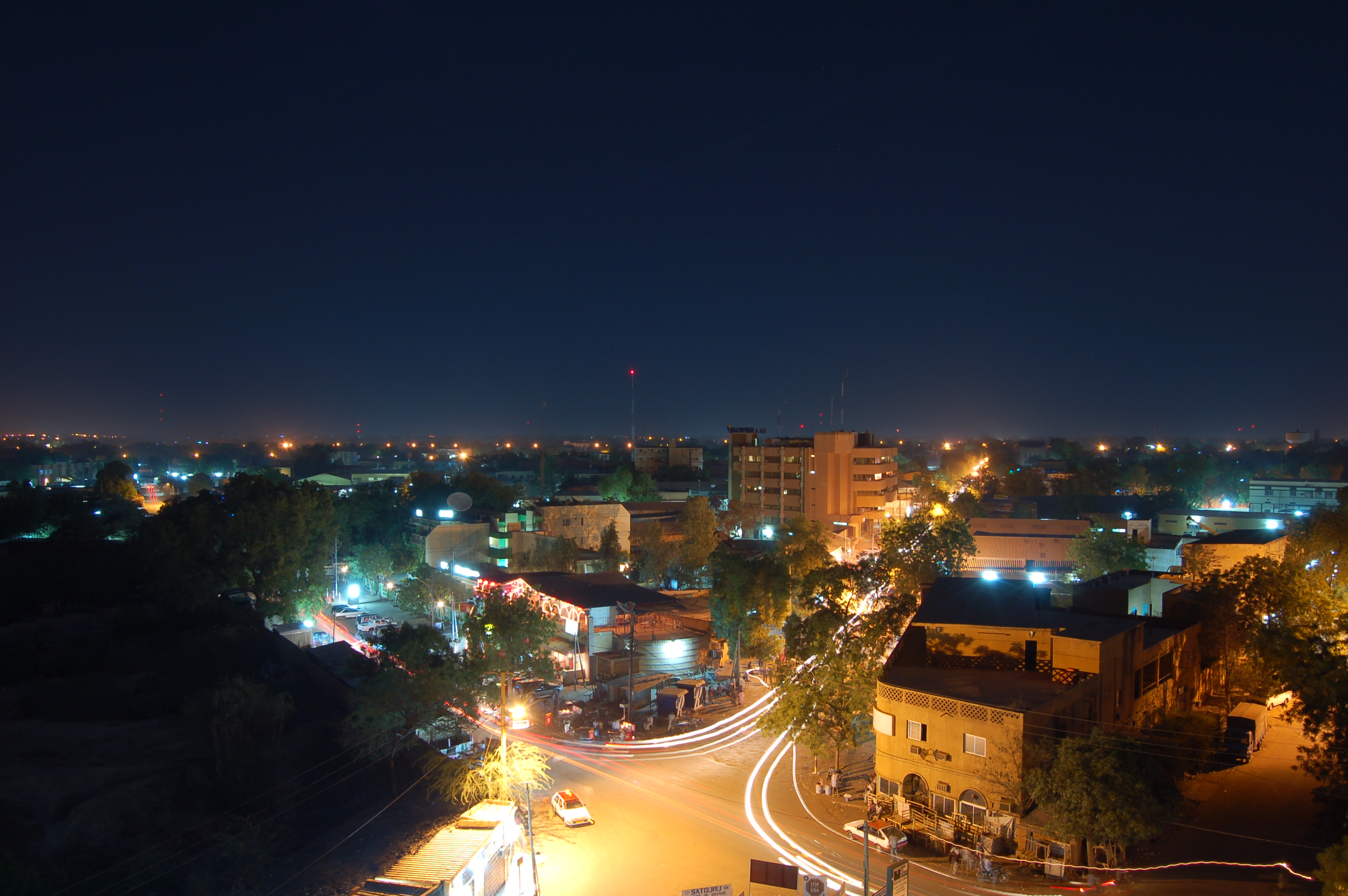
Niamey is the capital and largest city of Niger.

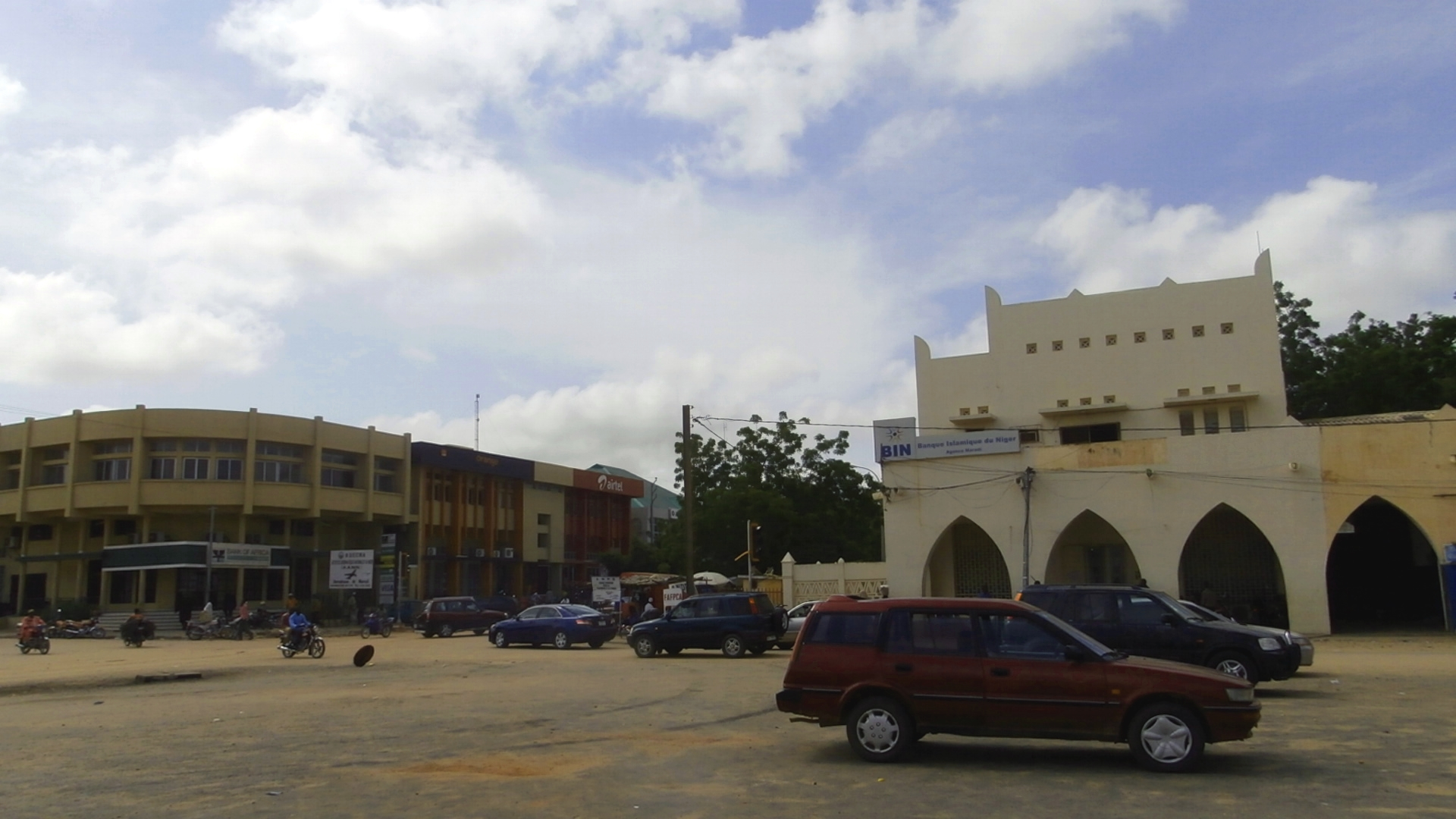
Maradi is the 2nd largest city of Niger.

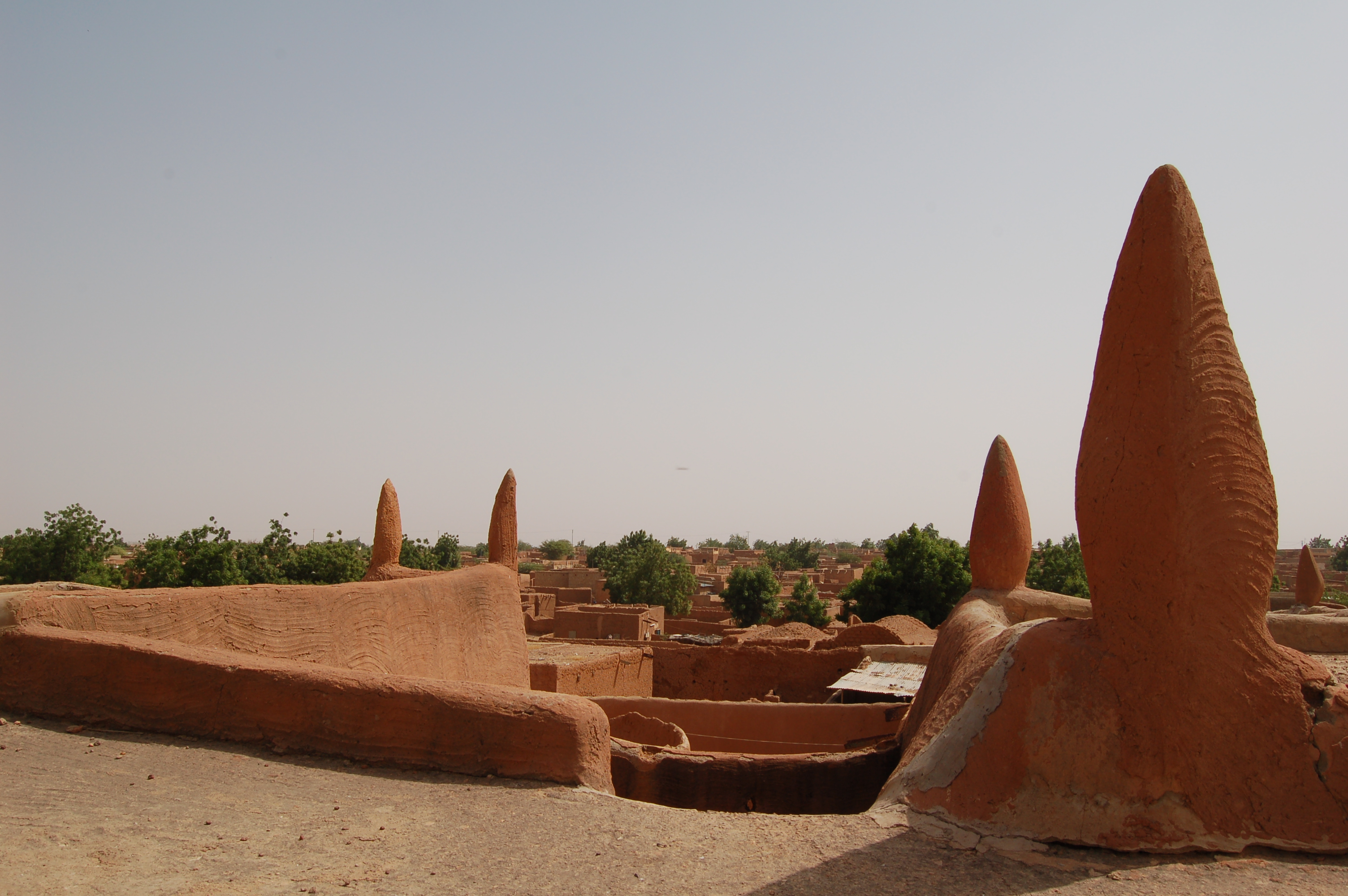
Zinder is the 3rd largest city of Niger.

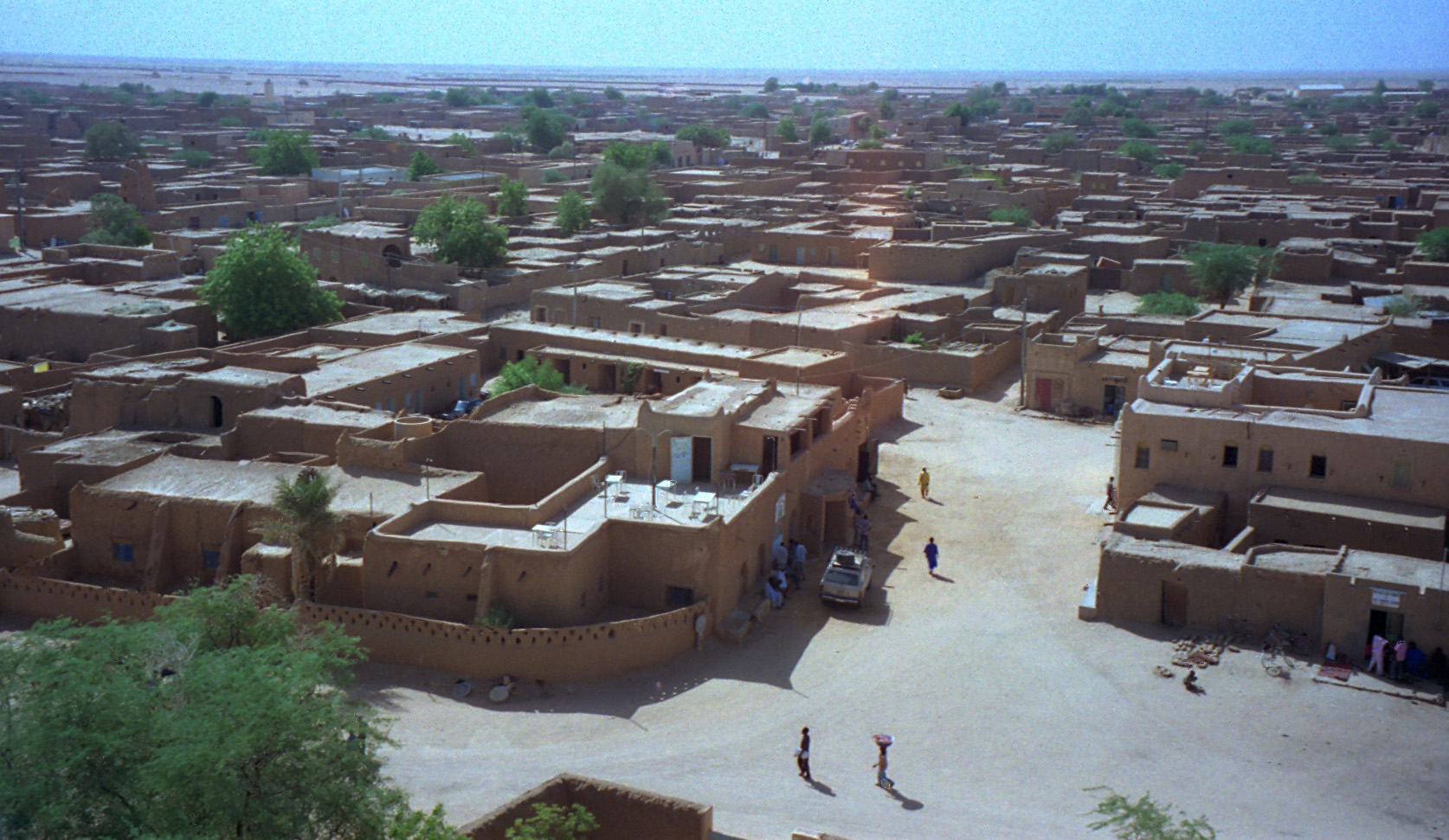
Agadez

This is a list of cities with populations over 10,000 according to the 2012 census.

City	Census division	Population 2012	Position
Abala	Tillabéri	11,068	
Abalak	Tahoua	21,842	15.4522222°N 6.2783333°E
Agadez	Agadez	110,497	16.9738889°N 7.9908333°E
Aguié	Maradi	17,397	13.5080556°N 7.7772222°E
Arlit	Agadez	78,651	18.7325°N 7.3680556°E
Ayourou	Tillabéri	11,528	
Balléyara	Tillabéri	16,063	
Birni Ngaouré	Dosso	14,430	13.0877778°N 2.9169444°E
Birni Nkonni	Tahoua	63,169	13.8°N 5.25°E
Bouza	Tahoua	10,368	
Dakoro	Maradi	29,293	13.8166667°N 6.4166667°E
Diffa	Diffa	39,960	13.3155556°N 12.6088889°E
Dogondoutchi	Dosso	36,971	13.6461111°N 4.0288889°E
Dosso	Dosso	58,671	13.0444444°N 3.1947222°E
Filingué	Tillabéri	12,224	14.35°N 3.3166667°E
Gaya	Dosso	45,465	11.8877778°N 3.4466667°E
Gazaoua	Maradi	14,674	
Gouré	Zinder	18,289	13.9869444°N 10.27°E
Guidanroumdji	Maradi	17,525	13.85°N 6.9666667°E
Illéla	Tahoua	22,491	14.4616667°N 5.2475°E
Keita	Tahoua	10,361	
Kollo	Tillabéri	14,746	13.3086111°N 2.3308333°E
Madaoua	Tahoua	27,972	14.1°N 6.4333333°E
Madarounfa	Maradi	12,220	
Magaria	Zinder	25,928	14.5666667°N 8.7333333°E
Maïné-Soroa	Diffa	13,136	13.2177778°N 12.0266667°E
Maradi	Maradi	267,249	13.4916667°N 7.0963889°E
Matameye	Zinder	27,615	13.4238889°N 8.4777778°E
Mayahi	Maradi	13,157	
Mirriah	Zinder	28,407	13.7141667°N 9.1505556°E
Nguigmi	Diffa	23,670	14.2527778°N 13.1108333°E
Niamey	Niamey Capital District	978,029	13.5166667°N 2.1166667°E
Ouallam	Tillabéri	10,594	
Say	Tillabéri	13,546	13.1080556°N 2.3597222°E
Tahoua	Tahoua	117,826	14.8902778°N 5.2677778°E
Tânout	Zinder	20,339	14.9702778°N 8.8916667°E
Tchintabaraden	Tahoua	15,298	
Téra	Tillabéri	29,119	14.0105556°N 0.7530556°E
Tessaoua	Maradi	43,409	13.7533333°N 7.9863889°E
Tibiri	Maradi	25,513	
Tillabéri	Tillabéri	22,774	14.206146°N 1.453457°E
Torodi	Tillabéri	11,813	
Zinder	Zinder	235,605	13.8°N 8.9833333°E

== Smaller cities and towns ==
=== Agadez Region ===
- Aderbissinat
- Agessis
- Aouderas
- Aratène
- Arlit
- Assamakka
- Assodé
- Bilma
- Dabaga
- Fachi
- Iferouane
- In-Gall
- Madama
- Tegguiada In Tessoum
- Timia
- Tin Dawin

=== Diffa Region ===
- Goudoumaria
- Bosso
- Chétimari
- N'Gourti
- Kabléwa
- N'Guelbély
- Gueskérou
- Nguigmi

=== Dosso Region ===
- Dogondoutchi
- Gaya
- Koré Maïroua

=== Maradi Region ===
- Galmi
- Guidan Roumji
- Mayahi

=== Tahoua Region ===
- Akoubounou
- Bouza
- Dabnou
- Korahane
- Malbaza Uzine
- Tchin-Tabaraden
- Galmi

=== Tillabéri Region ===
- Ayourou
- Balléyara
- Bani-Bangou
- Diagorou
- Karma
- Matankari
- Ouallam
- Tera
- Kourteye
- Koulikoira

=== Zinder Region ===
- Cheri
- Guidimouni
- Kelakam
- Mar-Jirgui
- Samia
- Takieta

=== Niamey Urban Community ===
- Gaweye
- Lamordé
- Soudouré
