= 2021 Niger floods =

Flooding in Niger

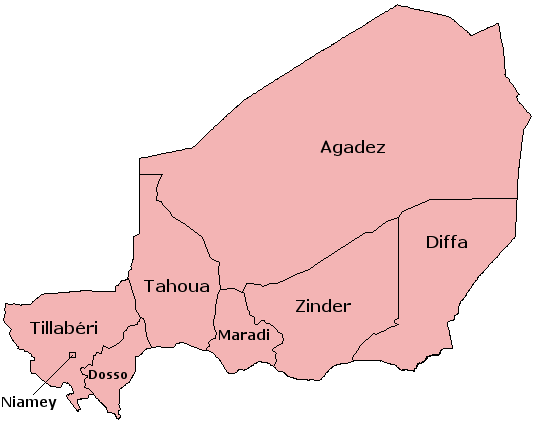
- Affected areas of flooding
- Date: June – September 2021
- Location: Niger
- Cause: Heavy rain
- Deaths: 77

In 2021, Niger experienced recurring flooding caused by heavy rainfall, leading to significant loss of life and widespread damage across the country. The floods resulted in 77 deaths and affected 250,331 people nationwide.

== History ==
Niger has experienced repeated and severe flooding in recent years, particularly during the annual rainy season. In 2016, floods caused at least 38 deaths and affected over 123,000 people, with regions such as Maradi, Tahoua, and Agadez among the hardest hit. In 2017, flooding events across different parts of the country resulted in 56 fatalities and widespread displacement, affecting 206,513 people, while heavy rains in 2018 caused 45 deaths and affected more than 200,000 people, destroying thousands of homes, farmland, and livestock. Similar large-scale flooding continued in 2019, affecting over 211,000 people and causing 57 deaths.

The situation worsened further in 2020, when floods killed at least 73 people and affected more than 400,000 others, creating a major humanitarian crisis. Widespread rainfall and overflowing rivers led to the destruction of tens of thousands of homes and extensive agricultural losses. Major rivers and dams reached dangerous levels, particularly around Niamey, causing large-scale displacement. The floods have caused the Niger River, dams and dikes to burst and huge volumes of water to engulf people's homes, farms, and other buildings without warning.

== Timeline ==
=== June ===
In mid-June, citizens across the nation began experiencing heavy rainfall, which quickly led to flooding, widespread damage, and casualties.

=== July ===
On 31 July, the national authorities in Niger reported 35 people dead as a result of flooding and heavy rains in the country since the start of the rainy season. At least 20 people died from collapsing houses, while 15 drowned in floodwaters. Twenty-four people were also injured, while a total of 26,532 individuals were affected. Meanwhile, over 2,500 houses and shelters were destroyed, along with schools, mosques, and workplaces. More than 700 livestock were also lost.

=== August ===
On 9 August, eight people were swept away by the flash floods that struck the city of Agadez.

On 11 August, the Directorate of Civil Protection in Niger reported 52 fatalities and more than 50,000 people affected from 5,694 households. Floods and rainfall has damaged 4,137 houses with around 300 completely destroyed. The capital, Niamey, saw heavy rainfall from August 10th to 11th, killing five. Flooding caused damage to roads, infrastructure, and buildings. Some districts were left isolated. Around 17 houses collapsed in the Yantala district, where three people died, one was missing, and two were seriously injured.

The next day, death toll rose to 55 and left 53,000 others displaced. More than 4,800 homes have been damaged by floods or landslips, and nearly 900 cattle have been lost. The regions of Maradi and Agadez as well as the capital, Niamey, were the most affected areas, seeing 16 fatalities.

On 14 August, nine more individuals died, upgrading the death toll to 64. Thirty-two people had died when their buildings collapsed, and another 32 drowned in flood waters. The floods and landslides had affected close to 70,000 people in total, with more than 5,100 houses destroyed or damaged and 69,515 people affected. In Niamey, six have died.

On 23 August, the death toll decreased to 62. Some perished as a result of drowning in floodwaters, while others died due to falling structures. Over 100,000 people were affected by the floods. Thousands of houses were destroyed, resulting in casualties. In Niamey, a total of 741 homes were destroyed and at least 16 deaths were reported. In Maradi Region, 18 people died and a total of 3,243 homes were destroyed. Meanwhile, at least 2,354 homes were destroyed by the floods in the Zinder Region, while 1,040 in the Tahoua Region. Flooding was recorded in 413 communities spanning 77 communes in all regions of Niger.

On 30 August, more than 158,000 people were affected by flooding that killed 67 people and destroyed an estimated 3,000 hectares of cropland. Forty-five percent of those affected were in the Maradi Region.

=== September ===
On 24 September, the Ministry of Humanitarian Action and Disaster Management reported that 77 people had been killed and more than 238,000 people had been affected. Since the beginning of rainy season, 12,000 houses collapsed, nearly 6,000 hectares of cultivable land were flooded, and more than 10,000 livestock have died.

No further updates were released. Overall, according to UNICEF's annual humanitarian report for Niger, a total of 250,331 people were affected by the floods, including 77 fatalities. The most severely affected regions were Maradi (104,032 affected), Zinder (29,635 affected), and Tahoua (25,663 affected). Through the Rapid Response Mechanism (RRM), UNICEF provided emergency assistance to affected populations in flood-impacted areas.

== Causes ==
Since Niger is prone to seasonal flash floods during its annual rainy season from June to September, heavy rain is the primary cause of the country's flooding. Other contributing factors include the blockage of flood channels, rivers overflowing, release of water from dams, and dikes bursting.

== See also ==
- List of deadliest floods
- List of floods
