= Jikata, Niger =

Jikata
- Location within Niger
- Coordinates: 13°38′0″N 7°50′0″E
- Country: Niger
- Region: Maradi Region
- Department: Aguie Department
- Commune: Jikata
- Elevation: 419 m (1,375 ft)

Jikata is a town in Aguie Department, Maradi Region, Niger. Lying almost halfway between Aguie (24km to its southwest) and Tessaoua (to its northeast), the town is well off the major autoroute running between the two cities.

Since the late 1990s, Jikata, along with the neighboring towns of Dourgou and Guidan Bakoye, has been the site of an international anti-erosion and anti-desertification initiative.
