= Gazaoua Department =

Gazaoua
- Department
- Interactive map of Gazaoua
- Country: Niger
- Region: Maradi Region

Area
  - Total: 375.9 sq mi (973.6 km^{2})

Population (2012)
  - Total: 160,536
  - Density: 427.1/sq mi (164.9/km^{2})
- Time zone: UTC+1 (GMT 1)

Gazaoua is a department of the Maradi Region in Niger. The department is located in the south of the country and borders Nigeria. Its administrative seat is the city of Gazaoua. As of 2012, the department had a total population of 160,536 people.

== History ==
The department dates back to the administrative post (poste administratif) of Gazaoua, which was established in 1964. In 2011, the administrative post was separated from the department of Aguié and became the department of Gazaoua.

== Municipalities ==
Gazaoua Department is divided into two municipalities, listed with population as of 2012 census:

- Gangara (51,930)
- Gazaoua (108,606)
