= Jikata =

Jikata may refer to:

- Jikata, Niger, a town
- a geisha who specializes in musicianship
