= Mayahi =

Coordinates: 13°57′N 7°40′E

- Commune
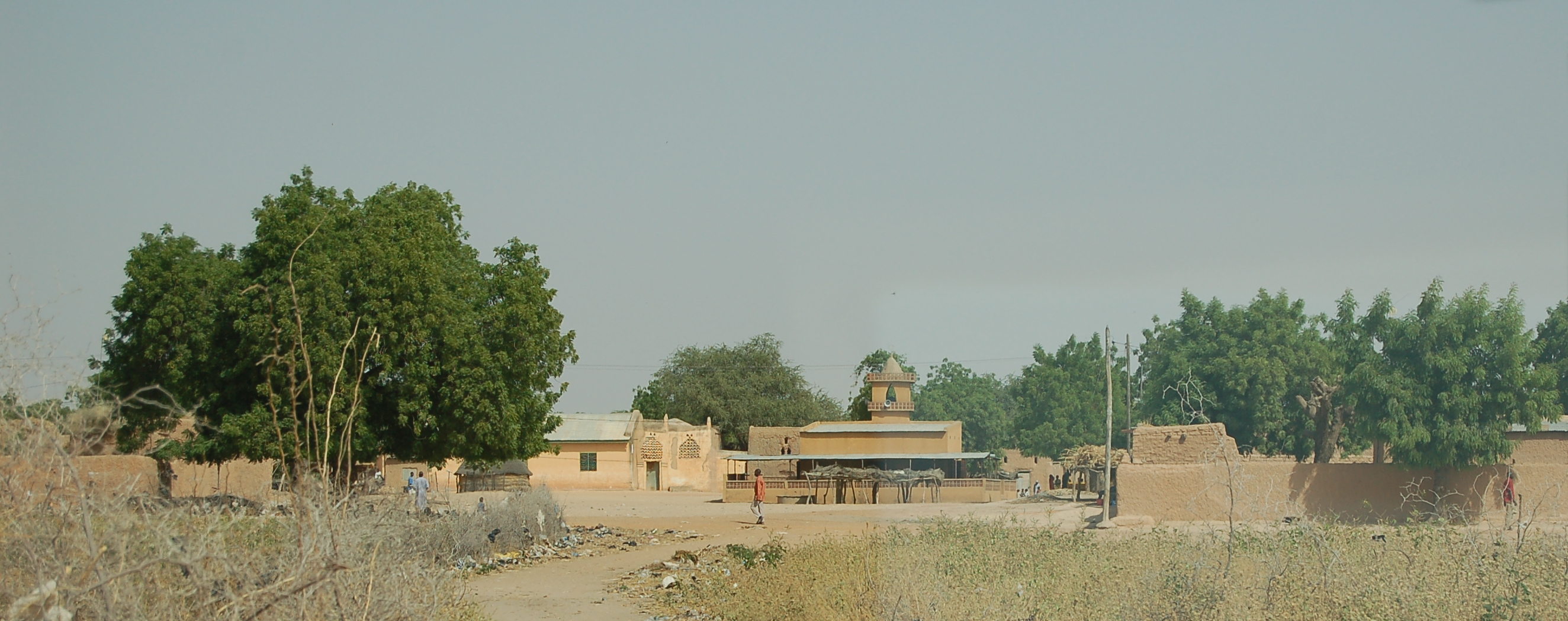

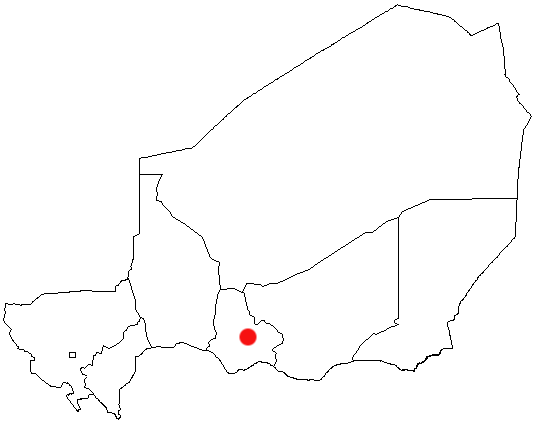

- Location in Niger
- Country: Niger
- Region: Maradi Region
- Department: Mayahi Department
- Urban Commune: Mayahi

Government
  - Type: Urban Commune

Area
  - Commune: 800.5 km^{2} (309.1 sq mi)

Population (2012 census)
  - Commune: 90,540
  - Density: 113.1/km^{2} (292.9/sq mi)
  - Urban: 13,157
- Time zone: UTC+1

Mayahi (var. Mayaki) is a town located in the Maradi Region of Niger. It is the seat of Mayahi Department and a Commune about 45 km from Tessaoua. In 2012 it had a population of 14,000 in the urban area. The name "Mayaki" is also a rulers' title among the Sudié and Maouri: local subgroups of the Hausa people.

== Geography ==
Mayahi is in the Sahel region. The neighboring municipalities are Tchaké in the north, El Allassane Maïreyrey in the northeast, Issawane in the east, Kanan-Bakaché in the southeast, Aguié in the south, Sarkin Haoussa in the southwest and Attantané in the northwest. The dry valley Goulbi N'Kaba runs through Mayahi.

Mayahi Municipality consists of an urban and a rural part. The urban municipal area is divided into eight districts. These are called Guidan Karo, Hôpital de District, Mayahi Saboua, Mayahi Safou, Mayahi Sofoua, Mayahi Zongo, Sabon Gari and Zongo Guidan Issa. The settlements in the rural municipal area include 54 villages, 63 hamlets and 26 camps.

== History ==
The place is named after its first ruler, Mayahi. Before the arrival of the French at the turn of the 19th and 20th centuries, Mayahi was part of the independent state of Gobir. The British travel writer A. Henry Savage Landor visited the villages of Mayahi, Digaba and Gamouza in 1906 as part of his twelve-month journey across Africa. At the beginning of the 20th century, the French administration set up a canton in Mayahi, to which the dissolved canton of El Moctar was added in 1924. The 236 kilometer long trail for horse riders between the towns of Madaoua and Tessaoua, which ran through Mayahi, was considered one of the main transport routes in the former colony in the 1920s.

In 2002, as part of a nationwide administrative reform, the territory of Mayahi Canton was divided into the municipalities of Mayahi as well as Attantané, Guidan Amoumoune (including the village of El Moctar) and Sarkin Haoussa.

== Economy ==
The city is located in a zone where rainfed farming is practiced. There is a livestock market in Mayahi. Market day is on Mondays.
