= Maman Sani Maigochi =

Nigerien musician and soldier (born 1975)

- Born: 22 October 1975 (age 50); Tessaoua, Maradi, Niger
- Military career
- Allegiance: Niger
- Branch: Nigerien Army
- Service years: 1994–present
- Rank: Sergeant
- Nickname: Artiste Militaire
- Known for: Pro-military music in Niger

Maman Sani Maigochi (born 22 October 1975) is a Nigerien artist and soldier known primarily for his pro-military and pro-Tiani music. Best known for his patriotic and nationalist compositions, Maigochi rose to widespread national prominence following the 2023 Nigerien coup d'état as a leading musical voice supporting General Abdourahamane Tiani.

== Early life and military career ==
Maigochi was born on 22 October 1975, in Tessaoua, a town in the Maradi Region of southern Niger. He enlisted in the Niger Armed Forces in 1994, was assigned to the Tondibiah training unit, and received formal musical training within military barracks. Over the course of his military career, he earned the rank of sergeant in the active ranks.

== Musical career ==
Maigochi became known in Niger for his pro-military music. He began to perform at major official events in 2015, also performing enthronement celebrations of the Sultan of Aïr. He received two awards from the Nigerien government in 2020 and 2021 for his work.

Maigochi became prominent after the 2023 Nigerien coup d'état, during which, his music was often played on the state television channel Télé Sahel. His music incorporates traditional Nigerien sounds and instruments, including the douma, kalangou and gourmi. He has described his goal as using music to encourage and energize soldiers and civilians.

He leads the Rassemblement des Patriotes, a coalition of military and civilian artists organized to support the CNSP, Niger's ruling military junta.

== Personal life ==
Maigochi is married, and is bilingual in both Hausa and French.

== Discography ==
=== Singles ===
- Goursoungoumi (2023)
- Soja Wuta (2024)
- Ga Tchiani (2024)
- Général Tchani (2024)
- AES Engagé (with Luc Traoré, 2026)
