= Tahoua I =

- Commune
- Interactive map of Tahoua I
- Country: Niger

Area
  - Total: 163.0 sq mi (422.1 km^{2})

Population (2012 census)
  - Total: 53,569
  - Density: 328.7/sq mi (126.9/km^{2})
- Time zone: UTC+1 (WAT)

Tahoua I is an urban commune in Niger. It is a commune of the city of Tahoua. As of 2012, it had a population of 53,569.
