= Ayourou =

- Town
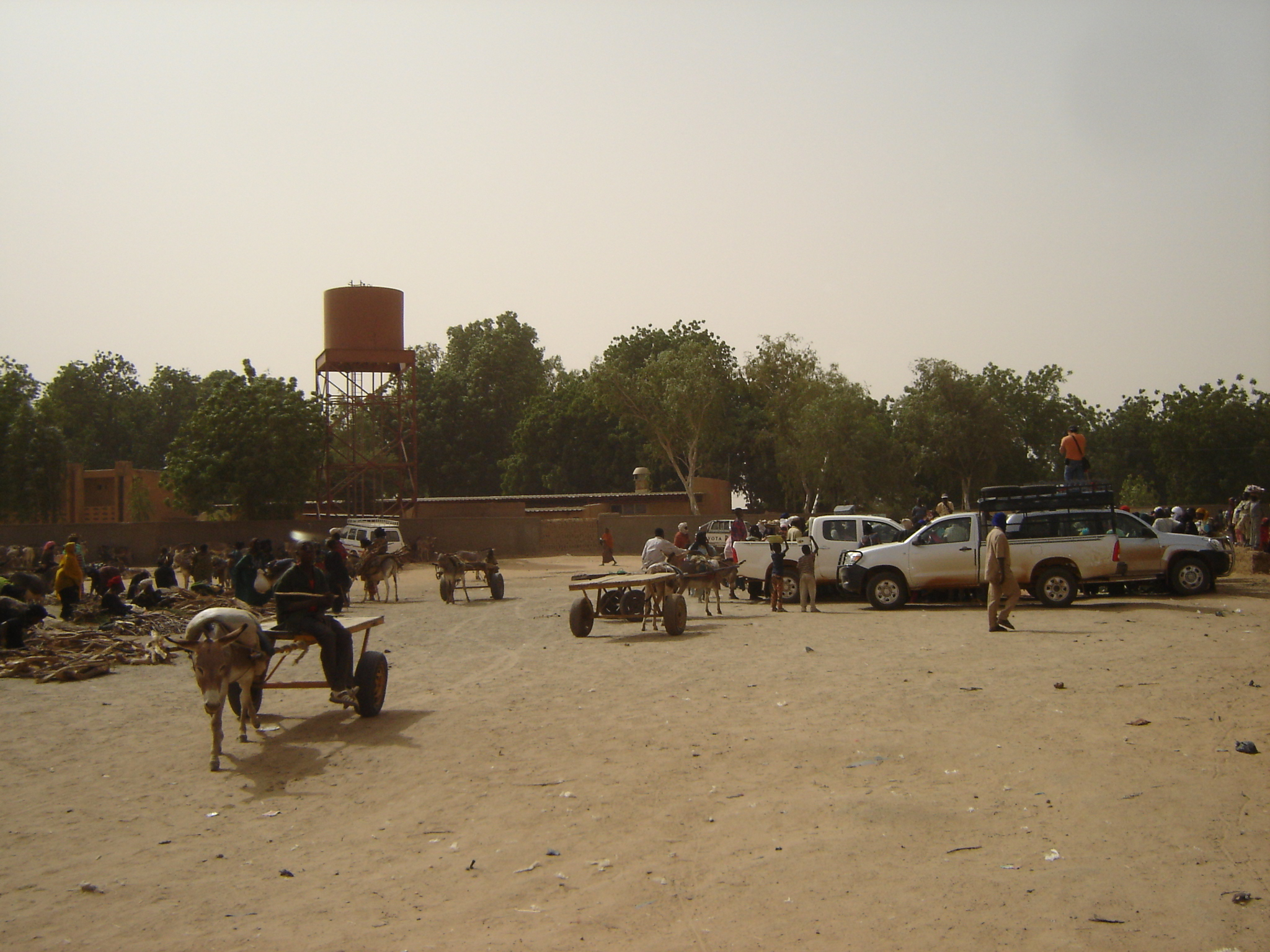
- Ayorou Market

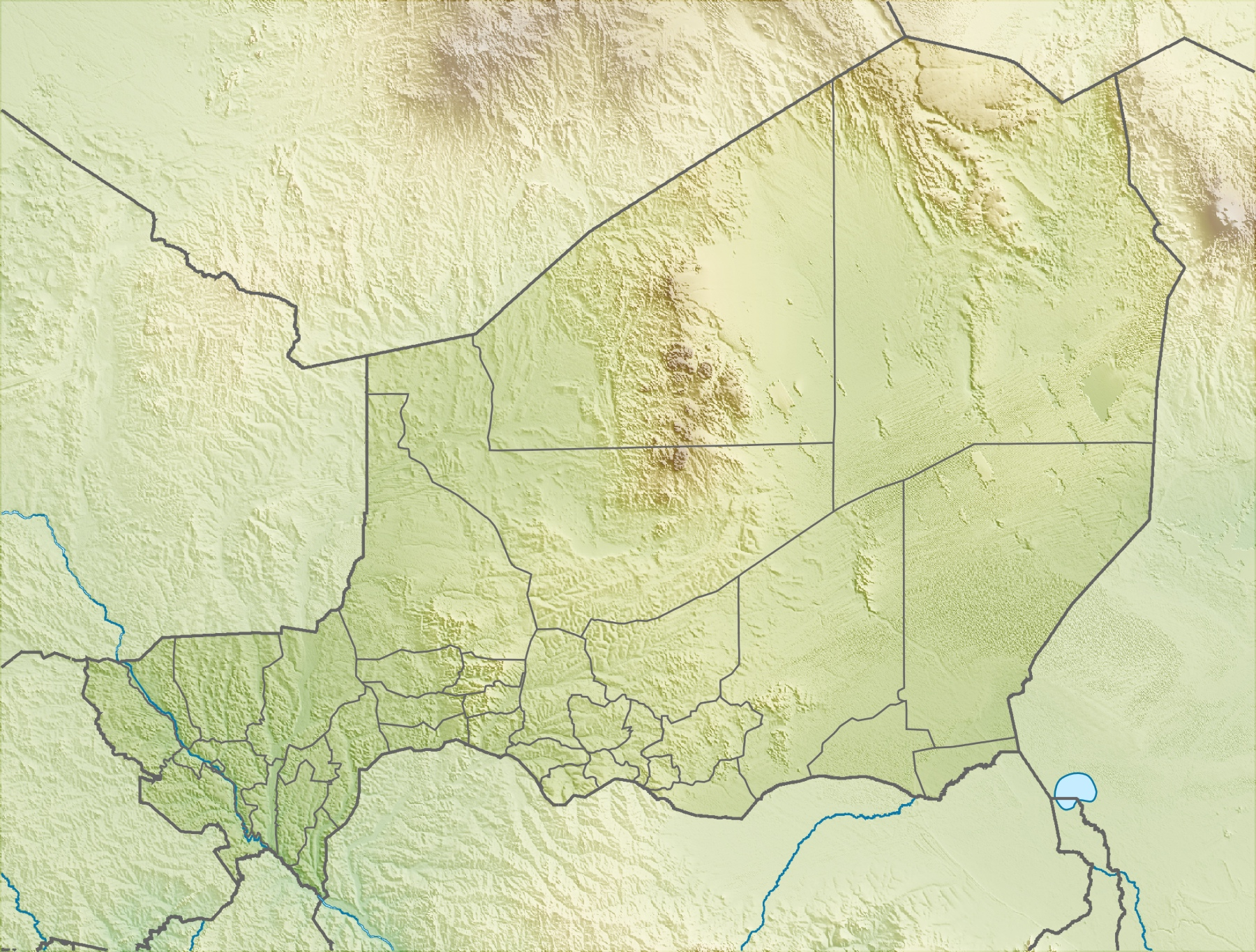
- Location within Niger
- Coordinates: 14°44′N 0°55′E
- Country: Niger
- Region: Tillabéri Region
- Department: Tillaberi Department

Area
  - Town: 1,262 km^{2} (487 sq mi)
- Elevation: 296 m (971 ft)

Population (2012 census)
  - Town: 33,527
  - Density: 26.57/km^{2} (68.81/sq mi)
  - Urban: 11,528
- Time zone: UTC+01:00 (WAT)

Ayourou (or Ayorou or Ayerou) is a town and rural commune in the Tillabéri Region, in western Niger. It is situated 208 km northwest of the capital Niamey near the Malian border. The old town stands on an eponymous island in the River Niger. It is known for its animal market and for wildlife including hippopotamuses and birds.

== History ==
In August 2023, the United Nations Office for the Coordination of Humanitarian Affairs alerted that intercommunal clashes caused dozens of deaths in Ayourou and neighboring communities Dessa and Gorouol with tens of thousands of people from neighboring villages and hamlets migrating to the city. Official numbers mention that around 13,400 displaced people accommodated in Ayourou were affected by voluntary return operations.
