= Dabnou =

Town in Niger

Coordinates: 14.158534°N 5.351328°E

Dabnou is a town in southwestern Niger. It is near the city of Tahoua. It is located in the Department of Illela, in Tahoua region, municipality of Badaguichiri. It has two districts, Angoua Gabas (East District) and Angoua Yamma (West District). The head of Angouas Gabas is lawali Gado Nahantchi. The head of Angouas Yamma is Mourtala Aboubacar Nabirni. The population has about 17,000 people. Almost all them are Hausa people. There are some Fulani in the town. It has four primary schools, one college school and a health center. The population practice agriculture, livestock and trade. A market takes place every Saturday. The town is crossed by the highway RN29, which connects Birni N'Konni in Tahoua.
