= 2016 Niger flood =

2016 flooding of the Niger River

2016 Niger floods
- Date: June–September 2016
- Location: Niger
- Deaths: 38
- Property damage: 9,000 homes; approximately 26,000 livestock

Heavy rains during the months of June, July and August 2016 resulted in extreme flooding of various rivers throughout Niger, particularly the Niger River, where the floods caused material damage and loss of life in Niger and other countries along the river's path.

Since 2000, flooding in Niger has intensified, with the most serious threats concentrated in the southwestern part of Niger and along the banks of the Niger River.

== Causes ==
- Wetland degradation: The ecology of the Niger River has been devastated by various land use changes. There is not enough vegetation to retain water, making floods more likely during the rainy season.
- Global climate change: Increased seasonal rainstorms (various extreme weather effects).
- Cities in Niger have poor planning and have not been able to adapt to rapidly growing population changes. Drainage systems are approaching capacity, and many towns even lack drainage networks. Because of rapid population growth, residents have built houses without planning and organization. The dumping of garbage on the streets blocks surface runoff during heavy downpour events.
- Excessive upstream dam discharge: Large amounts of water are released during the rainstorm season. The water volume downstream of the river channel increases and the water level of the river rises.

== Hydrological and meteorological observations ==
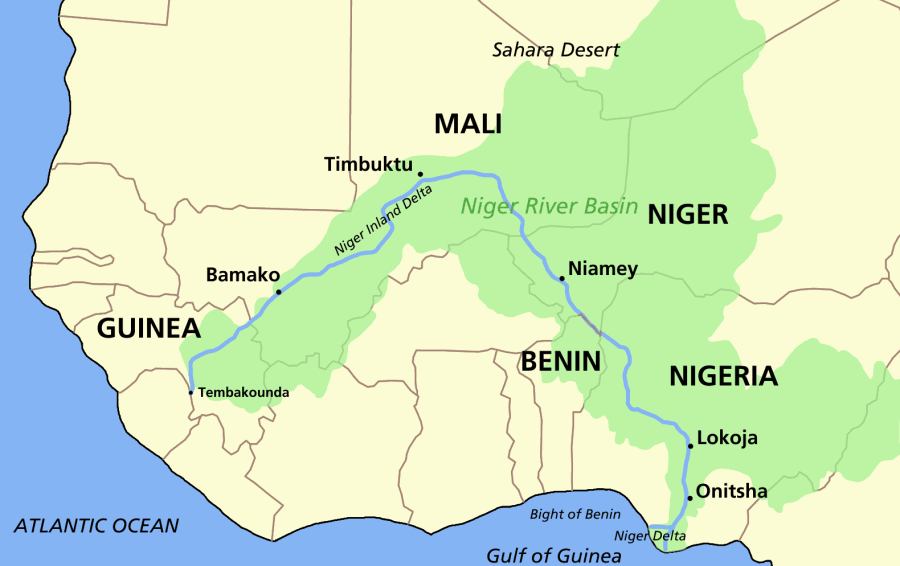
The Niger River basin includes area in Guinea, Côte d'Ivoire, Mali, Burkina Faso, Niger, Algeria, Benin, Nigeria and Cameroon.

The worst affected regions were the desert areas of Tahoua in the west and Agadez in the north, and to a lesser extent, the region of Maradi. Extremely fast rise of the river levels were recorded. Within a week, a rise of 1.90 m was recorded in the Sirba station in Garbé Kourou. A station on the Gorouol River, a tributary of the Niger River, measured a rise of 2.9 m over a two-week period at the end of July, the highest river level recorded in over 50 years of the station's operation. Water levels continued to rise, reaching their highest mark on 6 September since 1964 in the Inner Niger Delta.

The high river levels could have been exacerbated by uncommon extreme rain events throughout the Niger river basin, such as rainfall exceeding 200 mm (7.9 in) per day on May 23 in Niger, lengthy rainy period in Guinea and Mali from August 9 to August 27, and unusual rains in the Azawagh region, exceeding 200 mm (7.9 in) on August 13, and around 50 mm (2.0 in) on both August 27th and 29th.

== Impacts ==
The sub-Saharan region has seen an increase in the occurrence and intensity of floods during the past two decades, with the consequence of destabilizing food supply and health in an area already affected by extreme poverty and rapid population growth.

According to estimates, the 2016 flood resulted in the loss of at least 38 lives and destroyed around 9,000 homes, leaving thousands of people homeless. Approximately 26,000 livestock were lost. The floods provoked substantial displacement, exacerbated by ongoing attacks by Boko Haram, as well as increasing competition over agricultural land.

As of the end of September 2019, no cases of cholera had been reported, whereas floods in 2014 had affected more than 1,400 people.

== Response ==
Prior to the flood, much of the international humanitarian aid in Niger was concentrated in the Diffa region, due to the high number of Nigerian refugees. Groups like Doctors Without Borders and UNICEF joined the local and federal government response to the floods, primarily in the most-affected states of Maradi, Tahoua, Agadez, and Zinder.

Initial responses focused on limiting the spread of infectious and communicable diseases such as malaria and diarrhea, and providing mental support.

UNICEF was the sole provider of ready-to-use therapeutic foods in the country, distributed water treatment tablets to some regions, and helped rehabilitate wells affected by floods. The agency also supported the Niger government's response by providing non-food item kits, which were distributed by government authorities under coordination of the UN's Coordinating Committee on Health.

Doctors Without Borders put mobile clinics out into the field where they could promote hygiene practices, monitor outbreaks of disease and distribute non-food items like blankets, mosquito nets, hygiene supplies, and domestic utensils. They also helped dig basic latrines as a stopgap measure for people sheltering in community schools.

The local government distributed food rations and cooking oil as well as money (2,000 Central African Francs).

After years of repeated flooding, in 2012, the Niger government, with support from the World Bank, launched the PGCR-DU (Projet de Gestion des Risques de Catastrophes et de Développement Urbain). By 2016, the PGRC-DU has begun retrofitting numerous protective dikes and developing tools to better predict areas most susceptible to flooding and weigh various flood mitigation measures in those areas.
