= Samia, Niger =

Town in Niger

Coordinates: 14.711135°N 8.316650°E

Samia (also Tsamia or Tsamiya) is a village in the rural commune of Gangara in the Tanout Department of the Zinder Region of southern Niger. It is approximately 30 kilometres (19 mi) northwest of the town of Gangara.

== Etymology ==
In the Hausa language, the name of the village refers to the tamarind tree (Tamarindus indica). Its fruit, the tamarind, is consumed in the region and processed into juice and syrup, the latter serving as a laxative. The wood is used as fuel.

== Geography ==
The village is situated in the Damergou area of the Zinder Region at an elevation of 435 metres (1,427 ft). It lies approximately 30 kilometres (19 mi) northwest of Gangara, the main town of the rural commune of the same name, which is part of the Tanout Department in the Zinder Region. Other settlements in the vicinity of Samia include Batté Araban to the northwest, Kékéni to the northeast, Gouagourzo to the east, Dan Barko to the southwest, and Belbédji to the west.

Samia lies within the transition zone between the Sahara and the Sahel. The average annual rainfall in the area ranges from 200 to 300 mm.

== Demographics ==
At the time of the 2012 census, Samia had a population of 2,977, living in 489 households. In the 2001 census, the population was 1,894 across 305 households, and in the 1988 census, it stood at 1,344 across 252 households.

The settlement is inhabited by members of the Hausa ethnic group, and the Hausa language is spoken there. Population density in the area is relatively low, at 10 to 20 inhabitants per square kilometer.

== Economy and infrastructure ==
The population derives its livelihood primarily from agriculture. The settlement is situated in a transitional zone between the pastoralism of the north and the arable farming of the south, leading to land-use conflicts. A weekly market is held in Samia. Market day is Thursday. The village has a health center, the Centre de Santé Intégré (CSI). There is a school. National Road 32, which runs for 366.6 kilometers between Keita and Sabon Kafi, passes through Samia; this section consists of a simple dirt road.
