= Malbaza Uzine =

Town in Niger

Coordinates: 13.891411°N 5.350342°E

Malbaza Uzine is a town in southwestern Niger. It is near the city of Tahoua.
