= Tahoua II =

- Commune
- Interactive map of Tahoua II
- Country: Niger

Area
  - Total: 128.3 sq mi (332.3 km^{2})

Population (2012 census)
  - Total: 95,929
  - Density: 747.7/sq mi (288.7/km^{2})
- Time zone: UTC+1 (WAT)

Tahoua II is an urban commune in Niger. It is a commune of the city of Tahoua. As of 2012, it had a population of 95,929.
