= Koulikoira =

- Location in Niger
- Coordinates: 13°52′N 1°29′E
- Country: Niger
- Region: Tillabéri Region
- Department: Tera Department

Koulikoira (also: Kouli Koira, Koulikoiré, Kouli Kouara ) is a Songhai village in the rural municipality of Gothèye in Niger.

== Geography ==
The village is located around eight kilometers east of the town of Gothèye, the capital of the rural municipality with the same name in the Tillabéri Region. Koulikoira is located on the Dargol River, a few kilometers from its confluence with the Niger River.

== Culture ==
The village is run by a traditional local chief (chef traditionnel). Koulikoira is a predominantly Songhai settlementre. Relatively many Djasseré (griots) live here.

== Economy and Infrastructure ==
The market day of the week in Koulikoira is on Wednesday. The main items that traded are mats which are used for fencing, vegetables such as onions and potatoes, which are cultivated near the river.
