= Diagorou =

- Location in Niger
- Coordinates: 13°54′40″N 0°48′49″E
- Country: Niger
- Region: Tillaberi Region
- Communes of Niger: Diagorou

Population (2011)
  - Total: 1,386

Diagorou is a town in southwestern Niger, Say Department, Tillaberi Region. It lies west of the Niger River, roughly halfway between the capital, Niamey, and the Nigerien border with Burkina Faso. It is within the historic Liptako region. The town lies roughly 230 metres above sea level. Diagorou sits some 91 mi or (147 km) West of Niamey, the country's capital.
