= Ministry of Humanitarian Action and Disaster Management =

Nigerien Ministry

Agency overview
- Jurisdiction: Niger
- Headquarters: Niamey

The Ministry of Humanitarian Action and Disaster Management is a ministry in Niger with the mandate to manage disaster and humanitarian actions. The headquarters of the ministry is in Niamey.

The Minister of Humanitarian Action and Disaster Management is Aissa Laouan Wandarama.

== List of ministers ==
Minister	In office
Laouan Magagi	2016–2023
Aissa Laouan Wandarama	Present(2025)
