= Gazaoua =

Coordinates: 13°32′N 7°55′E

- Commune
- Interactive map of Gazaoua
- Country: Niger
- Region: Maradi Region
- Department: Gazaoua Department

Area
  - Commune: 268.2 sq mi (694.7 km^{2})

Population (2012 census)
  - Commune: 108,606
  - Density: 404.9/sq mi (156.3/km^{2})
  - Urban: 14,674
- Time zone: UTC+1 (WAT)

Gazaoua is a village and rural commune in Niger.
