= Dakoro =

Coordinates: 14°30′N 6°45′E

- Commune
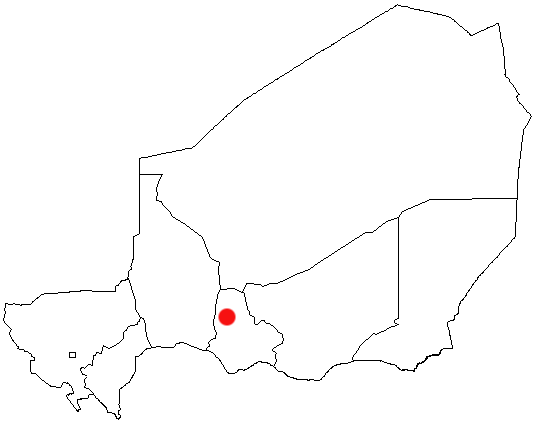
- Location of Dakoro in Niger
- Country: Niger
- Region: Maradi
- Department: Dakoro

Area
  - Commune: 126.5 sq mi (327.6 km^{2})

Population (2012 census)
  - Commune: 71,201
  - Density: 562.9/sq mi (217.3/km^{2})
  - Urban: 29,293
- Time zone: UTC+1 (WAT)

Dakoro is a town and commune located in the Maradi Region of Niger. As of 2012, it had a population of 71,201. It is the capital of the Dakoro Department.

== Geography ==
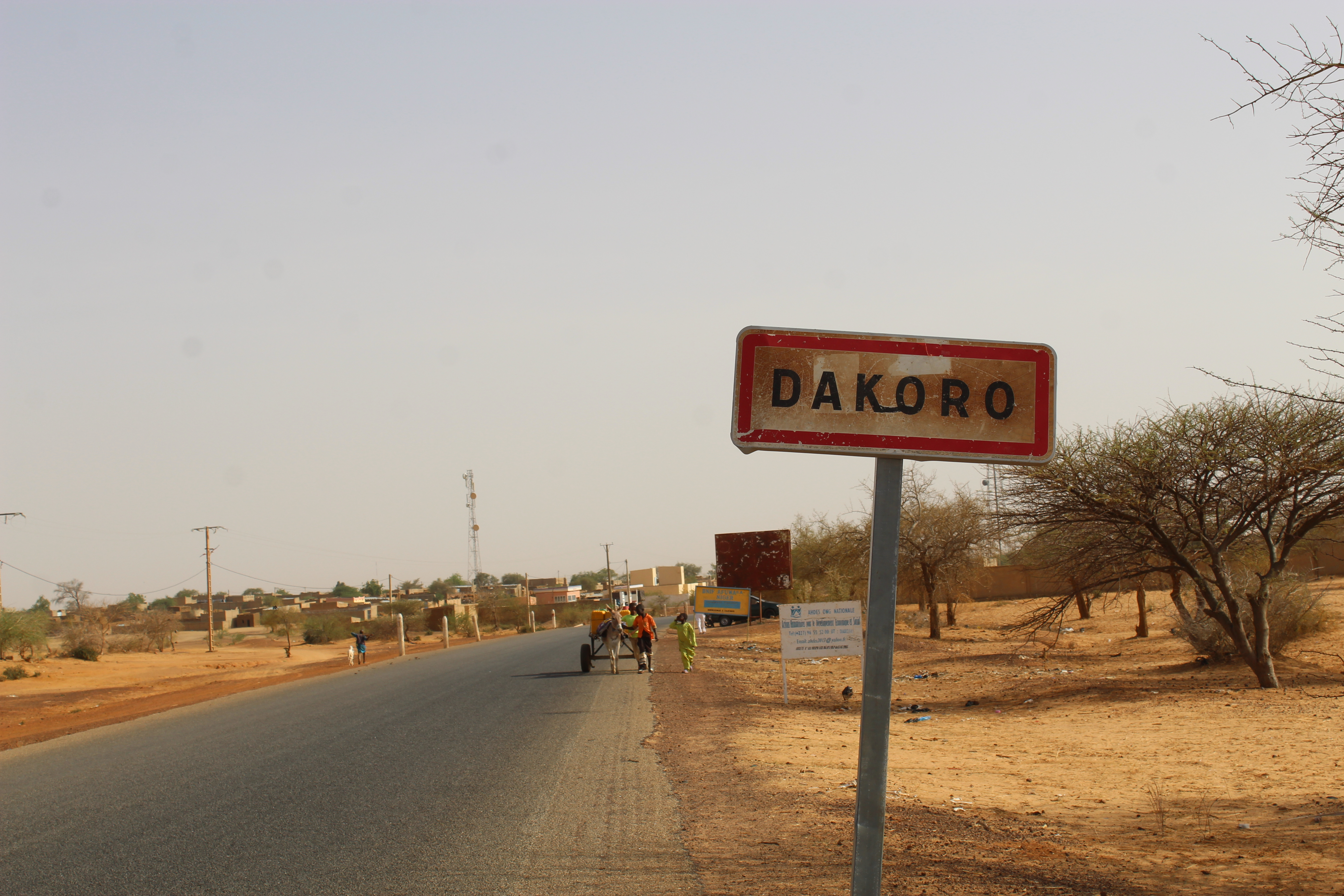
Town entrance (2023)

Dakoro is located in the Sahel. The neighbouring communes are Azagor to the north and Birni Lallé to the east, south and west. To the north of the town centre is the Tarka Valley, which extends into Nigeria. The formerly more diverse flora on the sandy soils of Dakoro is - due to recurring droughts and human settlement - essentially only characterised by acacias and balanites.

The municipality of Dakoro consists of an urban and a rural area. The urban area is divided into several neighbourhoods. These are Albadji, Camp de Gardes, Camp Gendarmerie, Centre de Réinsertion, Déram Balaka, Groupement FNIS, Hachimou Chipkaou, Kourmi, Mago Gari, Maguéma, Prison Civile, Quartier Administratif, Quartier Tsouna, Rouboukawa, Sabon Gari Mahamane, Takalmabua and Zangon Madougou. The settlements in the rural commune include 58 villages, 28 hamlets and three camps.

=== Climate ===
Dakoro has an arid desert climate.

== History ==
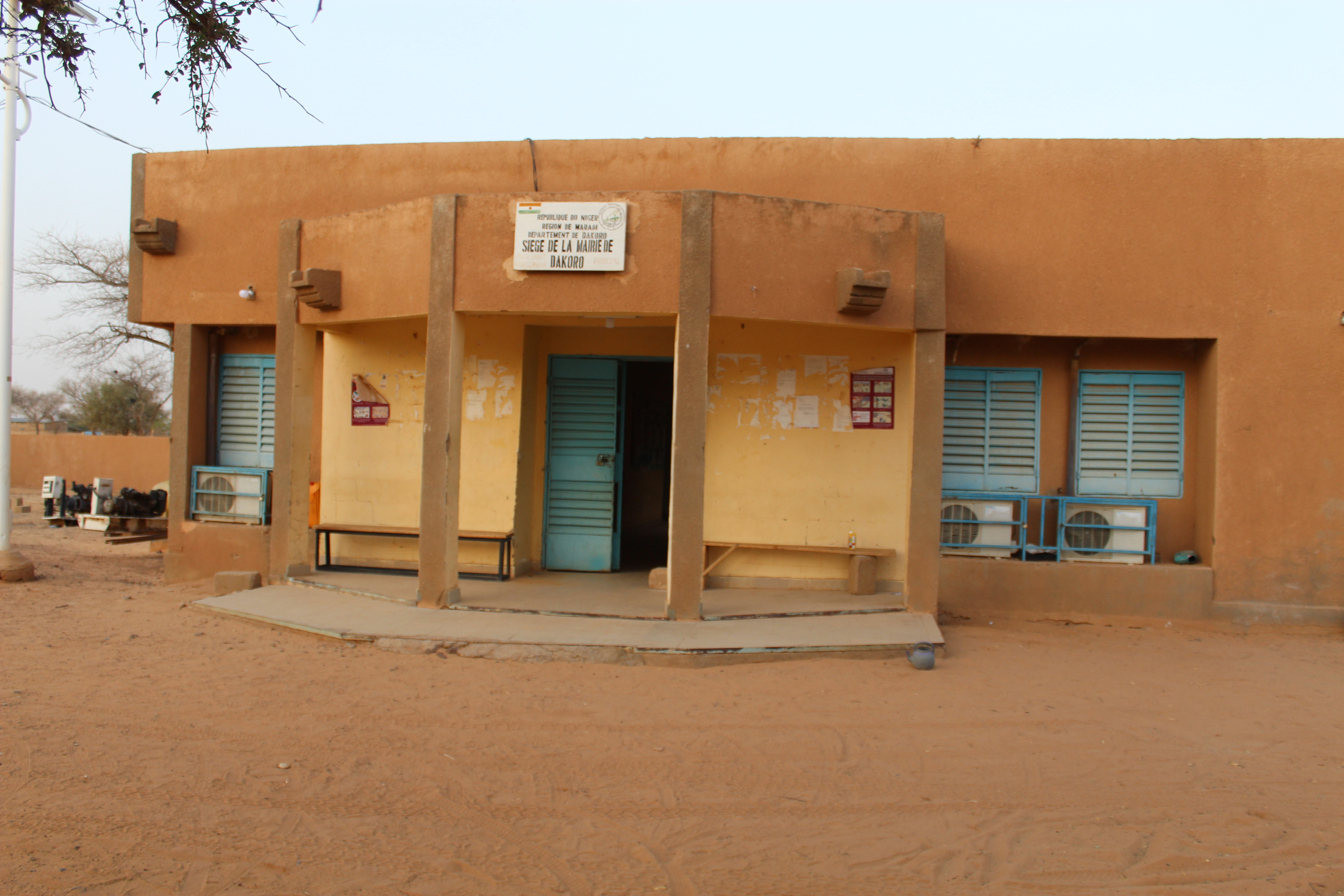
Town hall

Dakoro was founded in the 1890s by Hausa who came from the areas that are now the regions of Agadez and Tahoua.

In 1947, the then French colonial administration set up a school specifically for the nomadic population in the village of Maï Lafia, which belongs to Dakoro. The school was one of the first of its kind in Niger. The French overseas research institute Office de la Recherche Scientifique et Technique Outre-Mer (ORSTOM) operated a geomagnetic station in Dakoro, which was part of a network of several hundred ORSTOM stations in West Africa at which geomagnetic measurements were carried out in the 1950s. That in Dakoro was the first of its kind in Niger.

Dakoro became the capital of the Dakoro district in 1960, the year of Niger's independence from France, from which the Dakoro arrondissement emerged in 1964 and the Dakoro department in 1998. In the 1960s, the Dakoro market was an important transhipment centre for peanuts, the most important export commodity in Niger at the time. In 2002, the municipal area was expanded to include parts of Birni Lallé as part of a nationwide administrative reform.

== Demographics ==
In the 2012 census, the municipality had 71,201 inhabitants living in 9157 households. Around 30,000 people lived in the urban area. The municipality is a settlement area of the Gobirawa, Tuareg and Fulbe.

Census	Population
2001	42,126
2012	71,201

== Economy ==
The most important economic sectors are agriculture and trade. The cultivation of millet, sorghum and black-eyed peas is severely jeopardised by the lack of rainfall. Conflicts sometimes arise between farmers and cattle breeders over the few agriculturally usable areas. An important cattle market is held in the town centre. Trade links extend as far as Libya and to Nigeria. There are important weekly markets for the trade of agricultural goods.

== Health ==
In the city centre there is a district hospital and a health centre of the Centre de Santé Intégré (CSI) type with its own laboratory and maternity ward. There is another health centre of this type, but without its own laboratory and maternity ward, in the rural settlement of Intouila I.

== Persons ==
- Kalla Ankourao, Politician
