= Maradi Region =

Region of Niger

Maradi
- Region
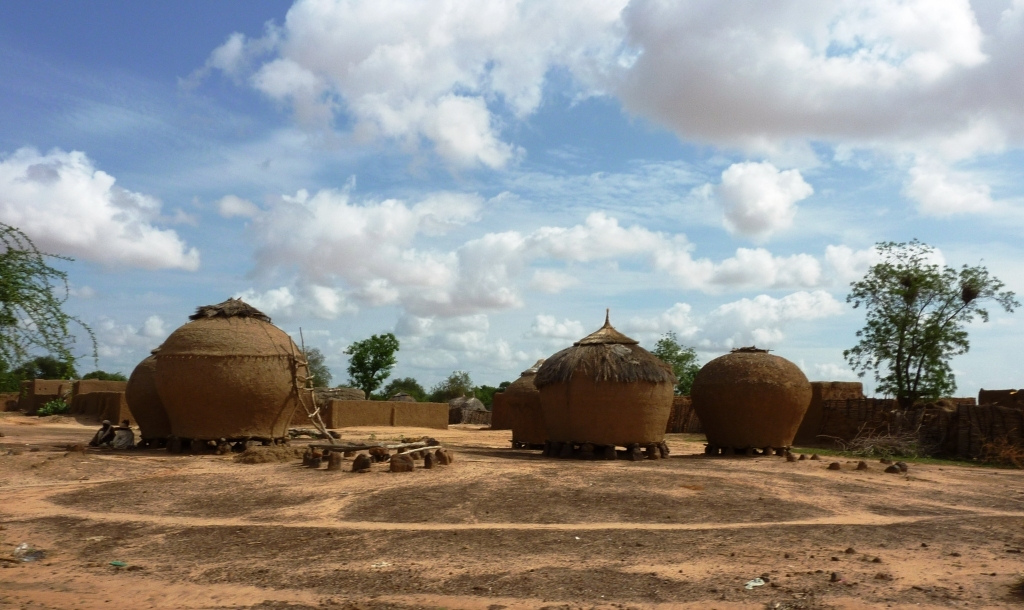
- A village in Maradi

- Location within Niger
- Coordinates: 13°30′N 7°6′E
- Country: Niger
- Capital: Maradi

Government
  - Governor: Schiabou Aboubacar

Area
  - Total: 35,100 km^{2} (13,600 sq mi)

Population (2020 estimate)
  - Total: 4,728,200
  - Density: 135/km^{2} (349/sq mi)
- Time zone: UTC+1 (West Africa Time)
- HDI (2021): 0.403 low · 3rd of 7

The Region of Maradi is one of seven regions of Niger. It is located in south-central Niger, east of the Region of Tahoua, west of Zinder, and north of the Nigerian city of Katsina. The administrative centre is at Maradi, with the population of the Region being predominantly Hausa.

== History ==
In 2021, a large gold mine collapsed in the region, killing 18 miners.

== Geography ==
Maradi borders Agadez Region to the north, Zinder Region to the east, Nigeria to the south (specifically the states of Katsina, Zamfara, and Sokoto), and Tahoua Region to the west. Most of the 35,100 km² of land is classified as "Sahel", though the northern parts merge into the Sahara desert, and the very southern edges along the border with Nigeria get almost 600 mm a year in average rainfall, with some areas receiving as much as 650–700 mm in better years. Lake Madarounfa lies south of Maradi, into which the seasonal Goulbi N'Gabi and Goulbi N'Maradi rivers flow.

=== Settlements ===
Maradi is the regional capital; other major settlements include Adjekoria, Aguie, Attantane, Azagor, Bader Goula, Baoudetta, Bermo, Birni Lalle, Chadakori, Dakoro, Dan-Goulbi, Djiratawa, El Allassane Maireyrey, Gababedji, Gabi, Gangara, Gazaoua, Guidan Amoumoune, Guidan Roumji, Guidan Sori, Hawandawaki, Issawane, Kanan-Bakache, Kollo, Koona, Korahane, Korgom, Kornaka, Madarounfa, Maiyara, Mar-Jirgui, Mayahi, Ourafane, Roumboui, Sabon-Machi, Safo, Sarkin Haoussa, Sarkin Yamma, Tagriss, Tchadoua, Tchake, Tessaoua and Tibiri.

== Administrative subdivisions ==
Departments of Maradi (old borders)

Maradi is divided into 8 Departments and one commune:

- Aguie Department
- Bermo Department
- Dakoro Department
- Gazaoua Department
- Guidan Roumdji Department
- Madarounfa Department
- Maradi City
- Mayahi Department
- Tessaoua Department

== Economy ==
The Niger-Nigeria border dips south below the Region's capital, forming an area sometimes called the "breadbasket" of Niger. While tobacco, mangoes, wheat, soy beans, and even cotton are cultivated in some areas, the predominant crops are groundnuts, grown commercially, millet, sorghum, and cow peas, typically for domestic consumption.

== Demographics ==
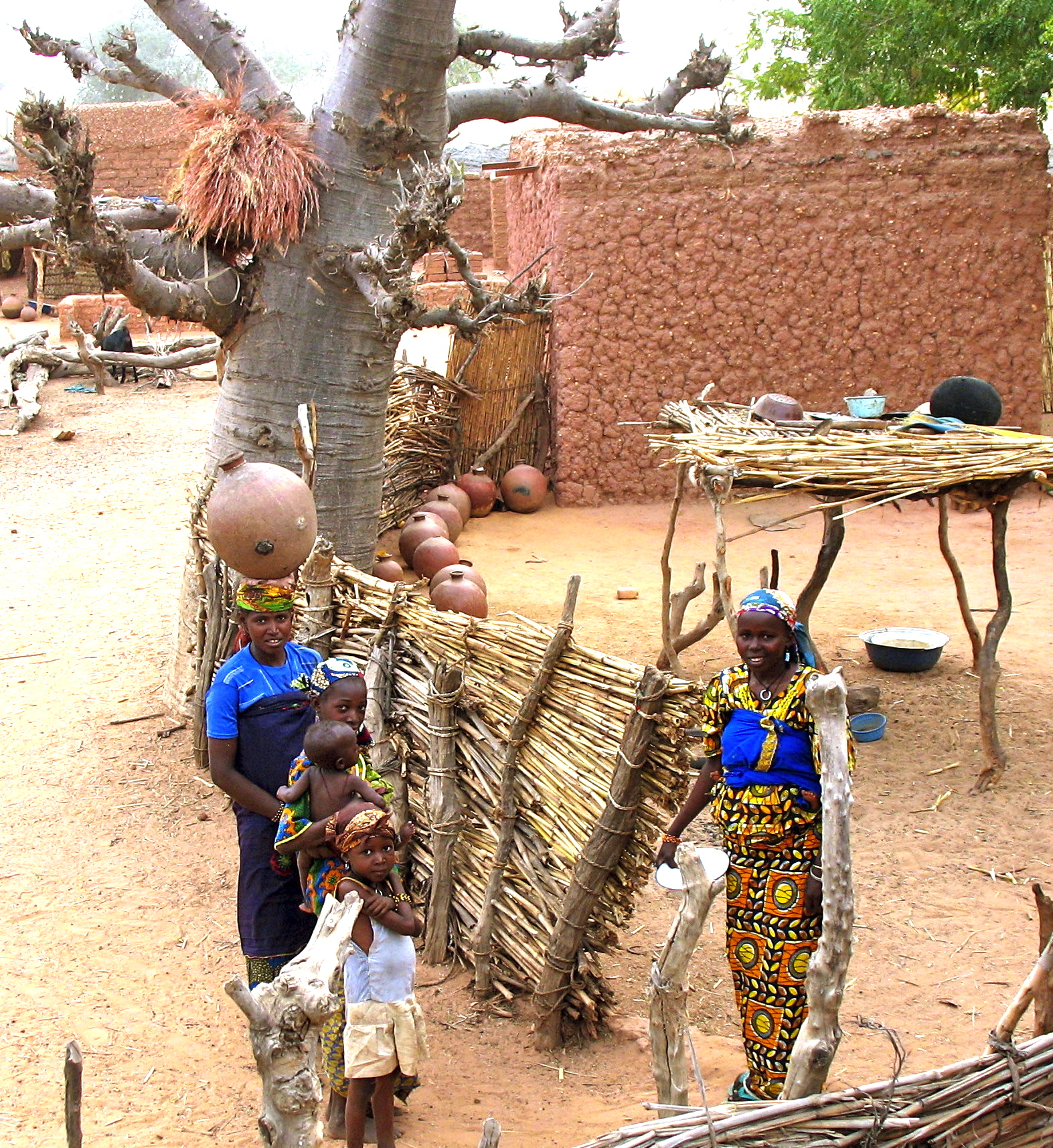
Hausa women in a village

Maradi is the most densely populated region of Niger, with a population of 3,117,810 as of 2011. Culturally, the Maradi Region forms the west-central section of the Nigerien Hausaland, which extends along the Nigerian border west to Dogondoutchi and east to just beyond Zinder. Other groups include the Fula people (including the Wodaabe, who predominate in the north and east of the region), and the Tuareg peoples, especially in the region's north and along major trade routes. The Tagdal language, thought to be a mixed Songhay-Tuareg language, is also spoken.

Historical population
Year	Pop.	±%
1977	949,747	—
1985	1,389,433	+46.3%
2001	2,235,570	+60.9%
2012	3,402,094	+52.2%

== See also ==
- Regions of Niger
- Departments of Niger
- Communes of Niger
