= Aguie Department =

Coordinates: 13°30′12″N 7°46′37″E

Aguie
- Department
- Aguie Department location in the region
- Country: Niger
- Region: Maradi Region

Area
  - Total: 676 sq mi (1,752 km^{2})

Population (2012 census)
  - Total: 245,996
  - Density: 363.7/sq mi (140.4/km^{2})
- Time zone: UTC+1 (GMT 1)

Aguie is a department of the Maradi Region in Niger. Its capital lies at the city of Aguie.

== Population ==
As of 2012, the department had a total population of 245,996 people. A primarily Hausa populated region, it is bordered to the south by Katsina State, Nigeria. This is following a partial UN funded development census of the region from 2005. The Maradi Region is one of the most densely populated areas of Niger, home to 20 per cent of the country’s population, most of whom are small farmers in rural settlements.

== Transport ==
Aguié lies on the main east-west highway between Maradi and Zinder. It is also 50 kilometres (30 miles) north of the city of Katsina, Nigeria, in an area of much cross-border trade and population movement.

== Communes ==
- Aguie
- Tchadoua
