= Tahoua =

- City
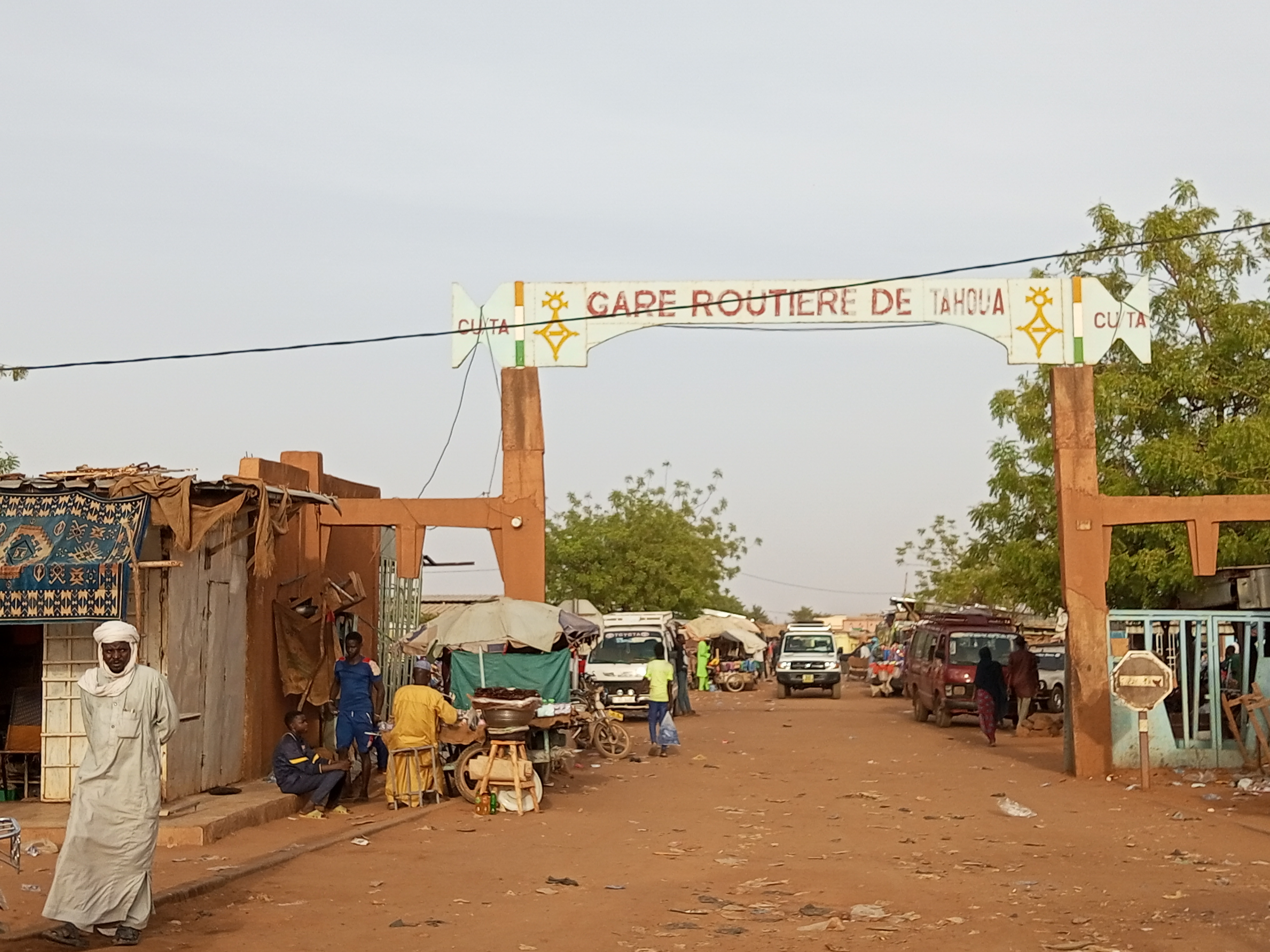
- View of Tahoua

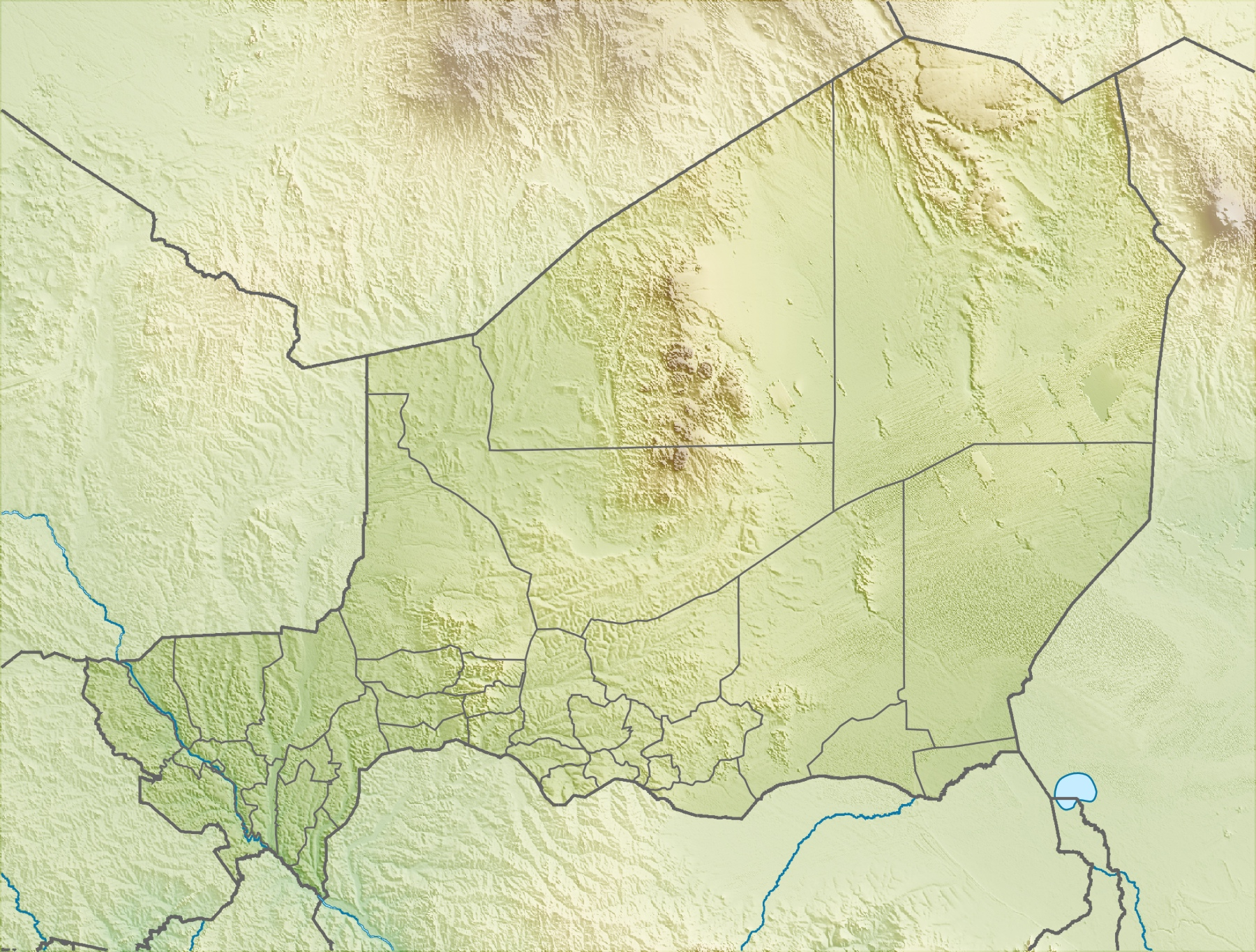
- Location in Niger
- Coordinates: 14°53′25″N 05°15′51″E
- Country: Niger
- Region: Tahoua Region
- Department: Tahoua Department
- Communes: Tahoua Communes I-III (Urban)

Government
  - Type: Commune
  - Mayor Commune I: Abala Elhadj Sofo
- Elevation: 380 m (1,250 ft)

Population (2012)
  - Total: 117,826
- Time zone: UTC+01:00 (WAT)

Tahoua is a city in Niger and the administrative centre of the Department of Tahoua and the larger Tahoua Region. It is the fourth largest city in the country, with a population of 117,826 (2012 Census).

== Overview ==
The city is primarily a market town for the surrounding agricultural area. It serves as an entrepot for Tuareg merchants from the north and Fulani traders from the south. The town is noted for its production of tchoukou cheese.

It is divided into a pair of urban municipalities: Tahoua I and Tahoua II. The town itself is divided into an old town area, and the Sabon Gari ('new town') area to the north.

== History ==
Tahoua began as a pair of small villages called Bilbis and Fakoua and began growing from the 17th century on as various groups began migrating to the area, such as the Fulani and Tuareg. Various animist (or Azna) peoples began fleeing to the area to escape persecution from Muslim rulers further north. In 1990, Tahoua was reported to have the lowest HDI score in history, at 0.172.

== Demographics ==
Tahoua is mainly dominated by Hausa, Fulani, and Tuareg ethnic groups.

Historical population
Year	Pop.	±%
1977	31,252	—
1988	49,948	+59.8%
2001	73,002	+46.2%
2012	117,826	+61.4%

== Transport ==
Tahoua is served by the Tahoua Airport.

== Climate ==
Tahoua has a hot desert climate (BWh) according to the Köppen climate classification.

Climate data for Tahoua (1961–1990)
Month	Jan	Feb	Mar	Apr	May	Jun	Jul	Aug	Sep	Oct	Nov	Dec	Year
Mean maximum °C (°F)	35.4 (95.7)	38.6 (101.5)	41.8 (107.2)	43.7 (110.7)	43.9 (111.0)	42.8 (109.0)	39.7 (103.5)	37.8 (100.0)	39.7 (103.5)	40.3 (104.5)	38.2 (100.8)	35.8 (96.4)	43.9 (111.0)
Mean daily maximum °C (°F)	31.0 (87.8)	34.1 (93.4)	38.1 (100.6)	41.1 (106.0)	41.0 (105.8)	38.6 (101.5)	35.6 (96.1)	33.7 (92.7)	36.0 (96.8)	37.7 (99.9)	35.4 (95.7)	32.2 (90.0)	36.2 (97.2)
Daily mean °C (°F)	23.0 (73.4)	25.9 (78.6)	29.9 (85.8)	33.3 (91.9)	34.2 (93.6)	32.3 (90.1)	29.7 (85.5)	28.6 (83.5)	30.0 (86.0)	30.6 (87.1)	27.2 (81.0)	24.1 (75.4)	29.1 (84.4)
Mean daily minimum °C (°F)	15.0 (59.0)	17.9 (64.2)	22.2 (72.0)	25.8 (78.4)	27.4 (81.3)	26.2 (79.2)	24.4 (75.9)	23.4 (74.1)	24.1 (75.4)	23.4 (74.1)	19.5 (67.1)	16.2 (61.2)	22.1 (71.8)
Mean minimum °C (°F)	11.2 (52.2)	12.9 (55.2)	16.3 (61.3)	21.1 (70.0)	22.7 (72.9)	20.1 (68.2)	19.4 (66.9)	19.7 (67.5)	19.8 (67.6)	19.8 (67.6)	16.1 (61.0)	12.4 (54.3)	11.2 (52.2)
Average precipitation mm (inches)	0.0 (0.0)	0.0 (0.0)	0.8 (0.03)	4.0 (0.16)	15.9 (0.63)	55.4 (2.18)	97.8 (3.85)	128.4 (5.06)	56.0 (2.20)	6.8 (0.27)	0.0 (0.0)	0.0 (0.0)	365.1 (14.37)
Mean monthly sunshine hours	285.2	257.6	269.7	261.0	279.0	261.0	260.4	251.1	255.0	288.3	285.0	285.2	3,248.5
Mean daily sunshine hours	9.2	9.2	8.7	8.7	9.0	8.7	8.4	8.1	8.5	9.3	9.5	9.2	8.9
Source: NOAA

== Notable people ==
- Diamond Zahra - actress

== Gallery ==
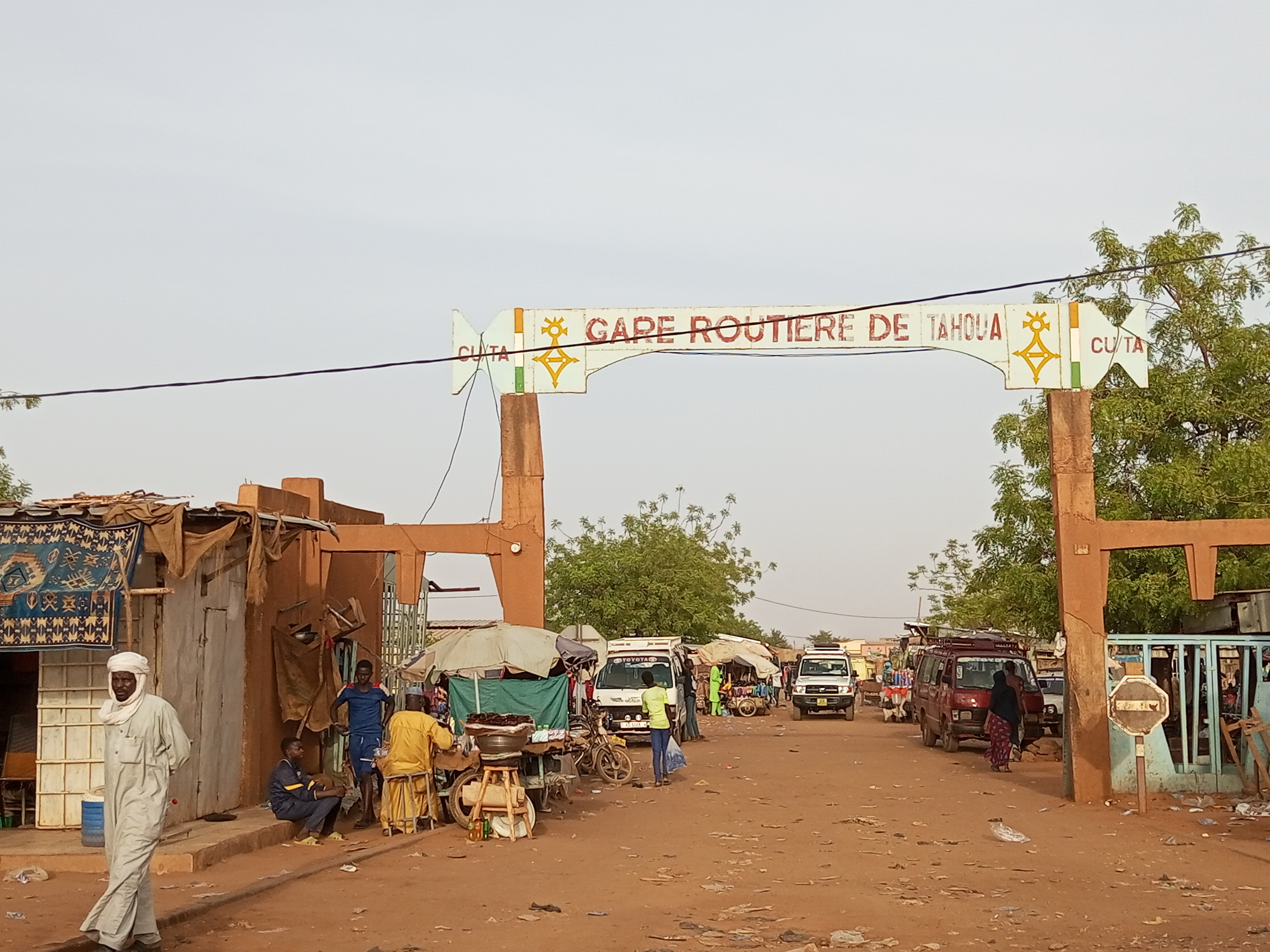
Tahoua Bus Station.

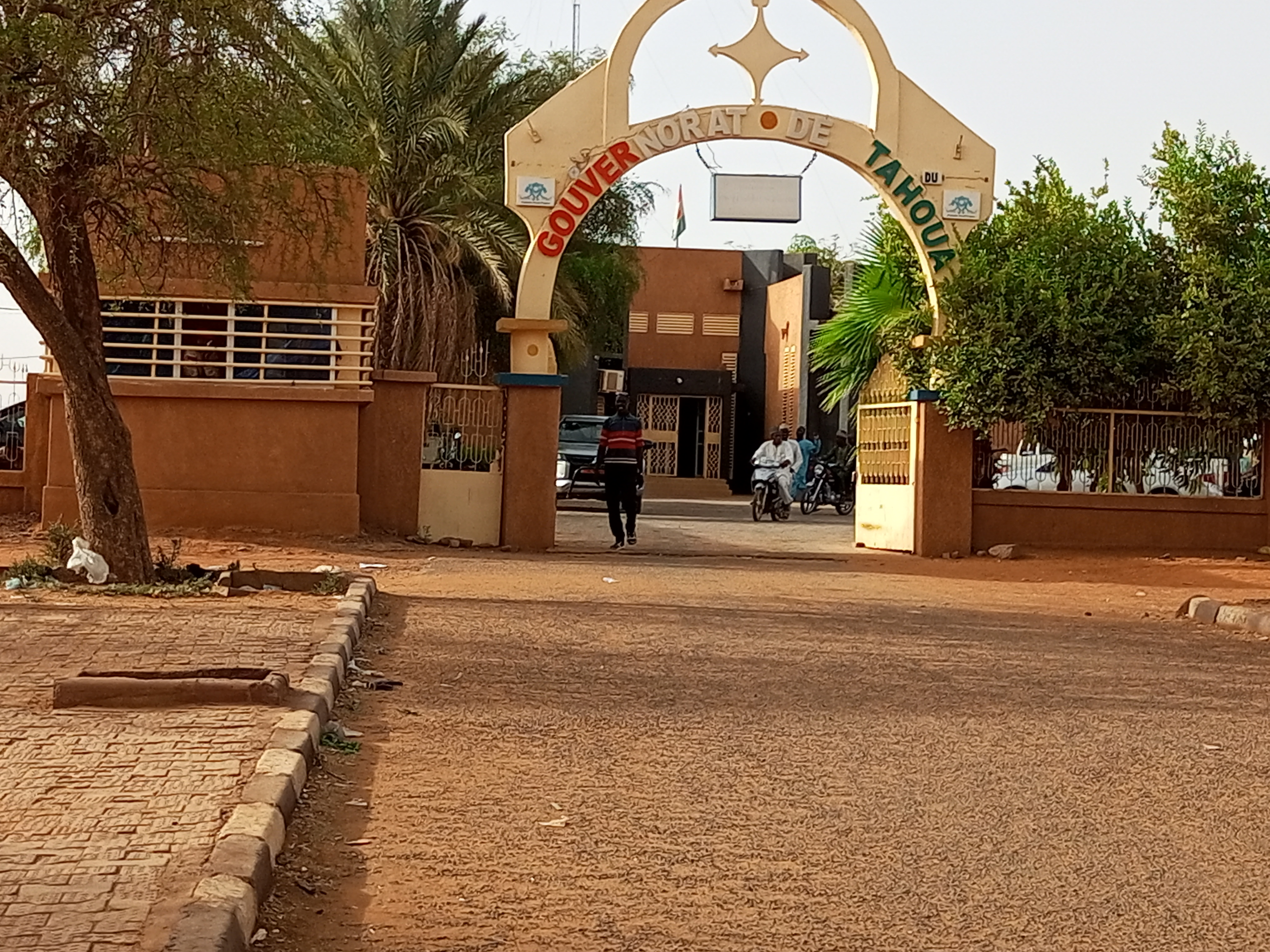
Tahoua Governorate Office.

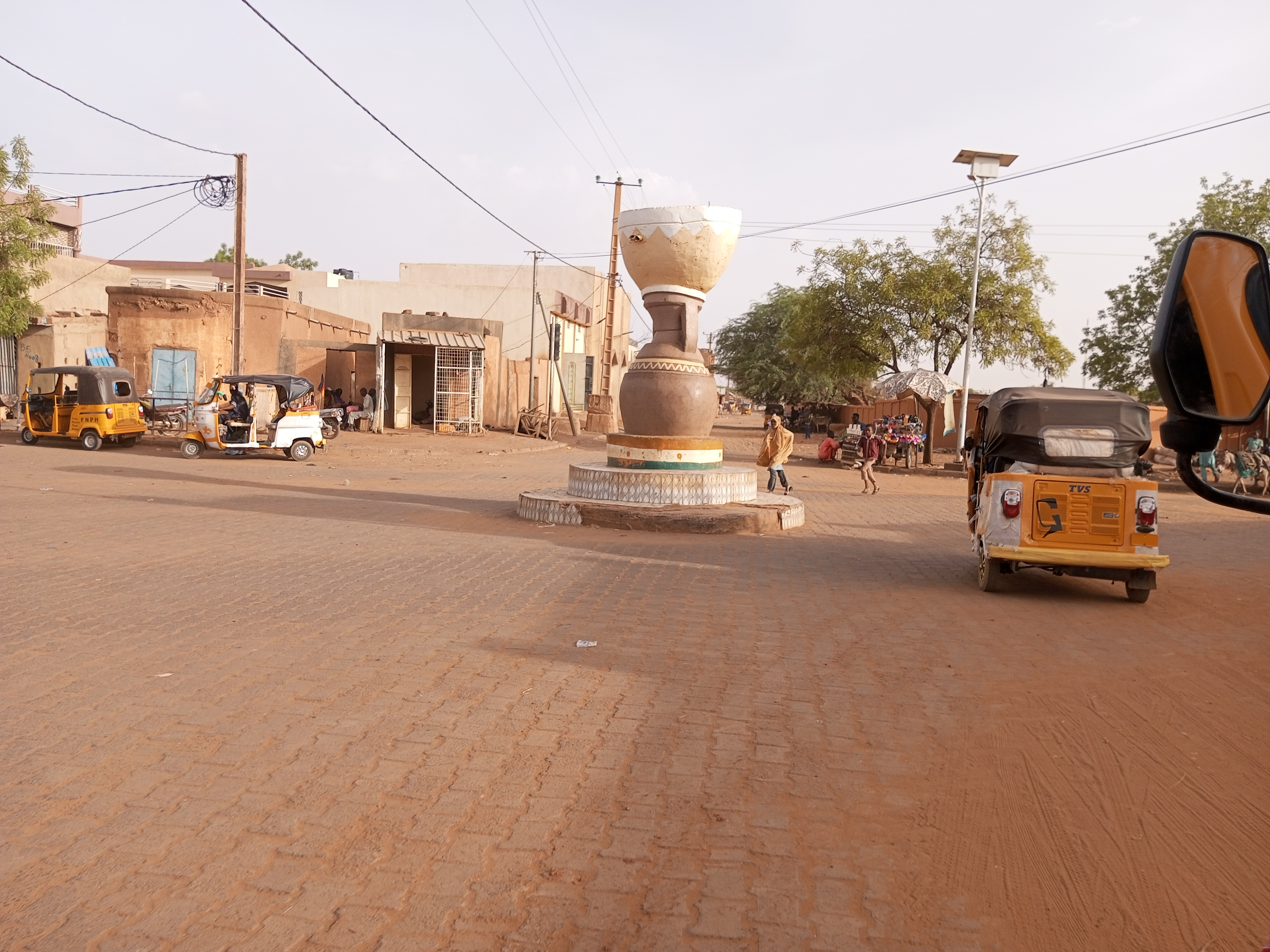
Tahoua roundabout
