= Guidanroumdji =

Coordinates: 13°39′27″N 6°41′45″E

- Commune
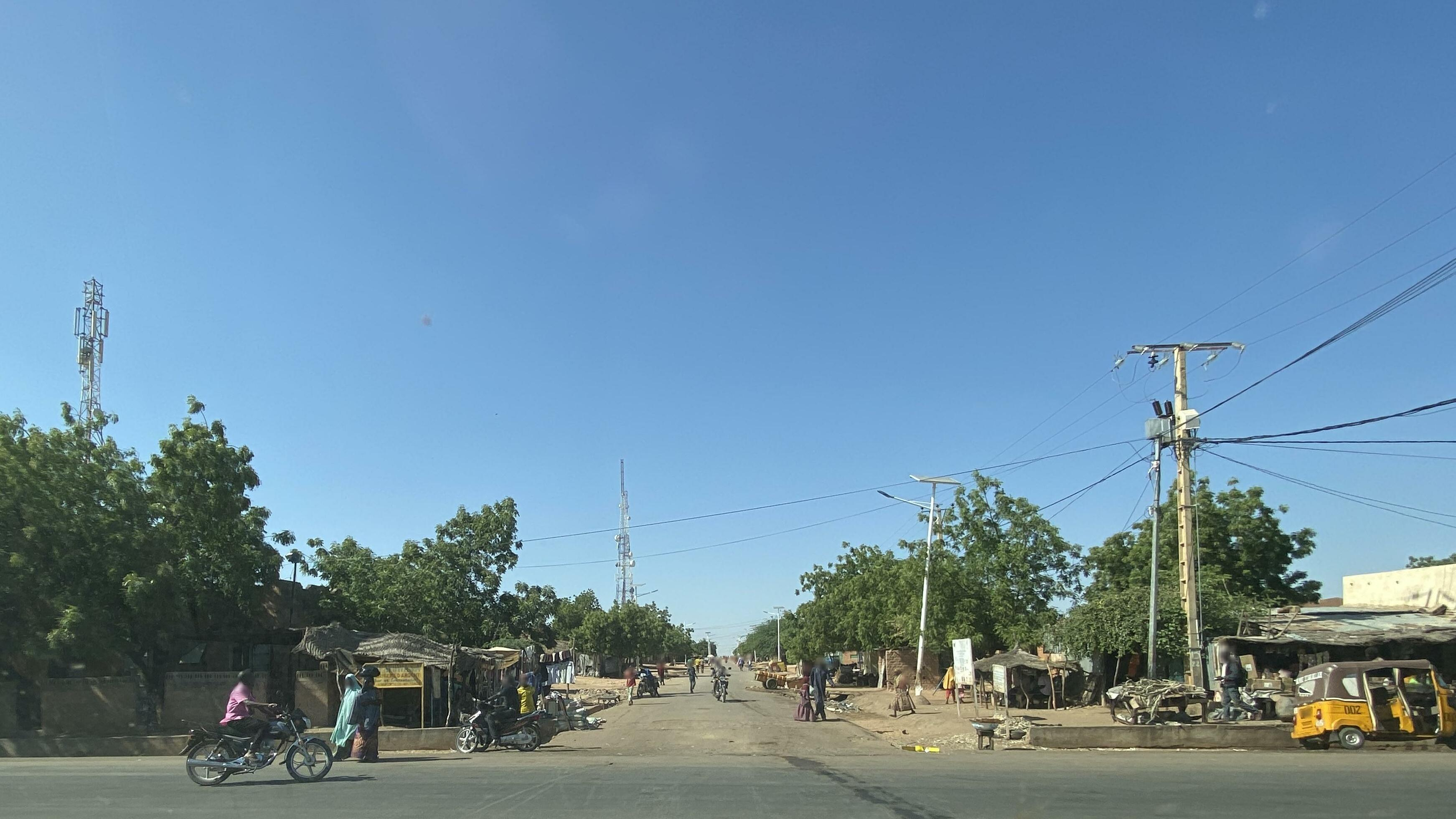
- Cityscape
- Interactive map of Guidanroumdji
- Country: Niger

Area
  - Commune: 414 sq mi (1,071 km^{2})
- Elevation: 1,014 ft (309 m)

Population (2012 census)
  - Commune: 95,791
  - Density: 231.7/sq mi (89.44/km^{2})
  - Urban: 17,525
- Time zone: UTC+1 (WAT)

Guidanroumdji (var. Guidan Roumdji, Guidan Roumji) is a town and urban commune in Niger. As of 2012, it had a population of 95,791.
