= Mar-Jirgui =

Town in Niger

Coordinates: 13.720708°N 8.129883°E

Mar-Jirgui is a town in southern Niger. It is near the city of Zinder.
