= Tessaoua =

- City
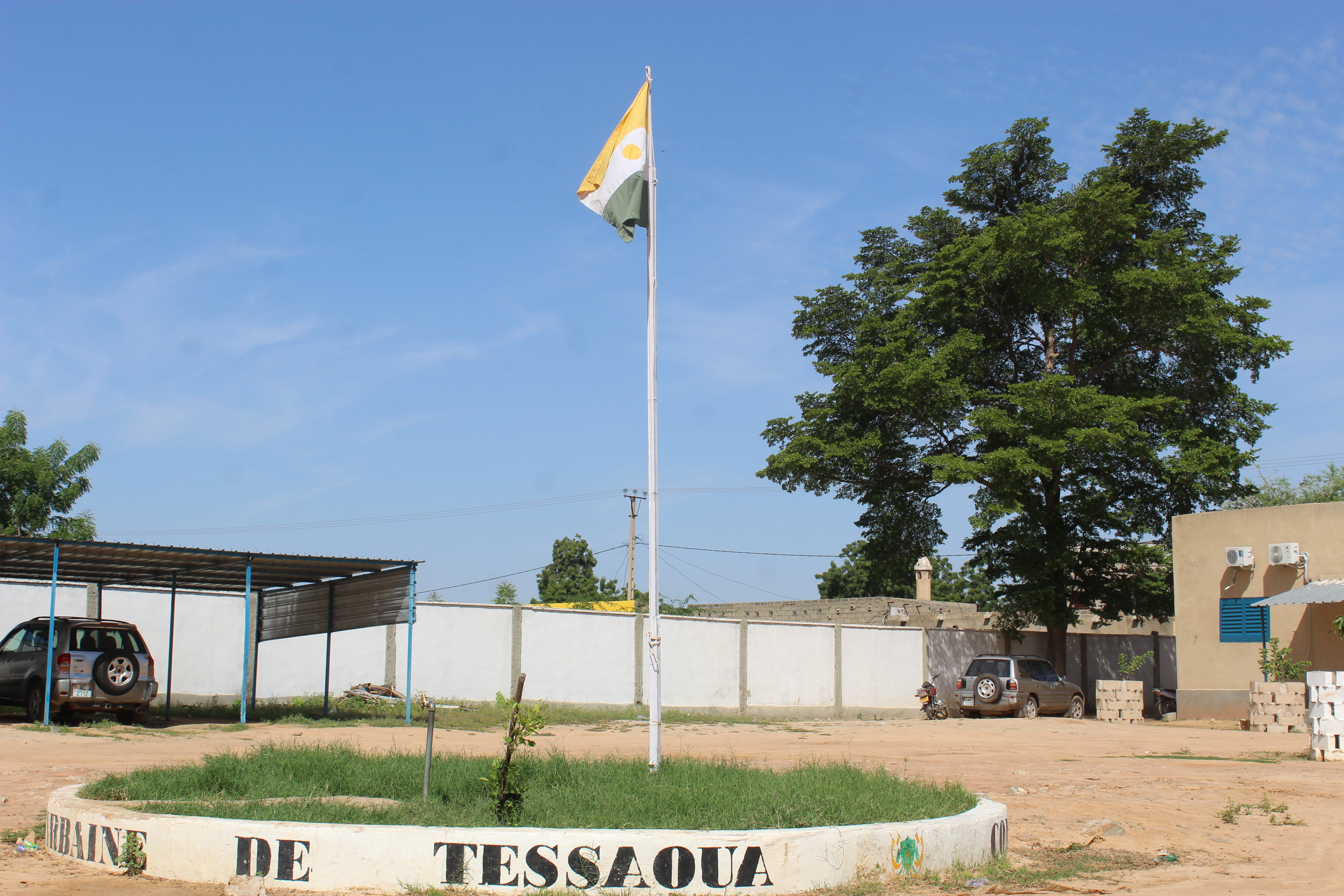

- Location within Niger
- Coordinates: 13°45′26″N 07°59′14″E
- Country: Niger
- Region: Maradi
- Elevation: 405 m (1,329 ft)

Population (2012 census)
  - City: 43,409
  - Metro: 172,796 (Tessaoua Commune)
- Time zone: UTC+1 (WAT)

Tessaoua, formerly known as Tessawa, is a city located in the Maradi Region of Niger. It has a population of 43,409 (2012 census). Tessaoua is historically an important city in its region. It is situated in a central geographical location. Tessaoua is a midpoint on a historical trade route between Agadez, Niger, in the north and Kano, Nigeria, in the south. During the collapse of the sultanates of Bornu and Sokoto during the late 19th century, the local ruler declared his territory the sultanate of Tessaoua; he signed a treaty of protection with the French captain Cazemajou in 1897, prior to the explorer's murder in nearby Zinder.

More important to modern Niger, Tessaoua is nearly halfway between the regional capitals of Maradi and Zinder on the one main east-west road in Niger. Zinder used to be the capital of Niger until the French colonialists moved the capital west to Niamey, where it was closer to others of the French West African holdings and thus easier to manage. Tessaoua used to be a regional capital, until political power was shifted to Maradi. Maradi is still the regional capital today.

Tessaoua has one high school (lycée) and several primary schools—some of which instruct in French and others which instruct primarily in the national language, Hausa, or also in Arabic in the Franco-Arabe, or Koranic schools. It does not have a university. There are two hospitals in Tessaoua. Many non-governmental organisation (NGOs) also have regional headquarters in Tessaoua, which allows them access to surrounding rural villages. There is also a football club in the town, Tessaoua FC. They competed in the 1975 Niger Cup final but lost to Olympic FC, 2–1. The club has since never appeared in another final.

== Climate ==
Climate data for Tessaoua
Month	Jan	Feb	Mar	Apr	May	Jun	Jul	Aug	Sep	Oct	Nov	Dec	Year
Mean daily maximum °C (°F)	31.0 (87.8)	33.9 (93.0)	37.5 (99.5)	39.7 (103.5)	39.3 (102.7)	37.2 (99.0)	33.2 (91.8)	31.5 (88.7)	33.5 (92.3)	36.3 (97.3)	34.7 (94.5)	31.3 (88.3)	34.9 (94.9)
Daily mean °C (°F)	22.6 (72.7)	25.1 (77.2)	29.1 (84.4)	31.8 (89.2)	32.3 (90.1)	30.9 (87.6)	27.9 (82.2)	26.5 (79.7)	27.7 (81.9)	28.6 (83.5)	26.2 (79.2)	22.8 (73.0)	27.6 (81.7)
Mean daily minimum °C (°F)	14.2 (57.6)	16.3 (61.3)	20.7 (69.3)	24.4 (75.9)	25.4 (77.7)	24.7 (76.5)	22.6 (72.7)	21.6 (70.9)	21.9 (71.4)	21.0 (69.8)	17.7 (63.9)	14.4 (57.9)	20.4 (68.7)
Average rainfall mm (inches)	0 (0)	0 (0)	0 (0)	3 (0.1)	12 (0.5)	41 (1.6)	112 (4.4)	154 (6.1)	54 (2.1)	6 (0.2)	0 (0)	0 (0)	382 (15)
Source: Climate-Data.org

== Population ==
Date (Census)	Population
20 November 1977	10,590
10 May 1988	19,737
20 May 2001	31,667
10 December 2012	43,409

== Notable people ==
- Mamadou Maidah (1924–2005), Former Foreign Minister of Niger
- Maman Sani Maigochi, Nigerien military artist
