= Gangara, Niger =

Coordinates: 13°25′27″N 7°50′23″E

- Commune and village
- Gangara, Maradi, 2026
- Interactive map of Gangara, Niger
- Country: Niger

Area
  - Total: 107.7 sq mi (278.9 km^{2})

Population (2012 census)
  - Total: 51,930
  - Density: 482.2/sq mi (186.2/km^{2})
- Time zone: UTC+1 (WAT)

Gangara, Niger is a village and rural commune in Niger.
