= Aguie =

Aguié Aguie, Agyé, Agye
- Location within Niger
- Coordinates: 13°51′21″N 08°18′12″E
- Country: Niger
- Region: Maradi
- Department: Aguié

Area
  - Total: 1,177 km^{2} (454 sq mi)
- Elevation: 434 m (1,424 ft)

Population (2012 census)
  - Total: 152,788
  - Density: 129.8/km^{2} (336.2/sq mi)
- Time zone: UTC+1

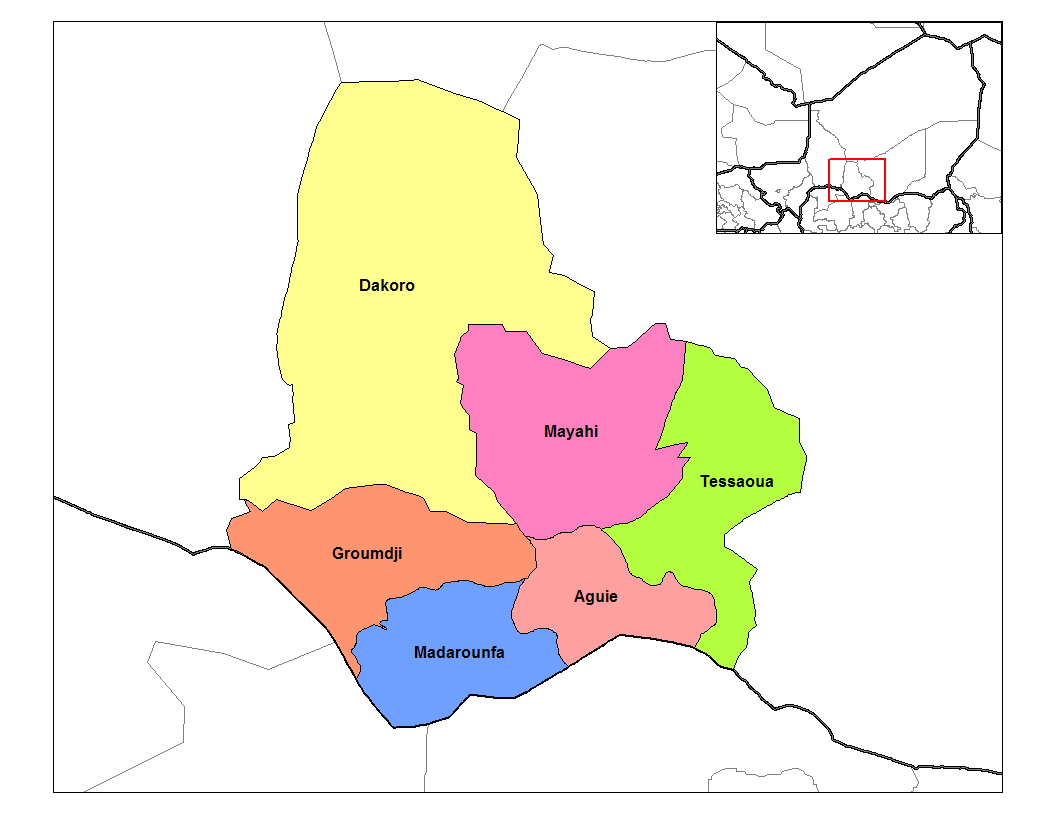
Departments of Maradi Region, Aguié Arrondissement in pink.

Aguie (var. Aguié, Agyé) is a town and capital of the Aguie Department in southern Niger, 69 kilometres (43 miles) east of the nation's second largest city, Maradi.

== Administrative structure ==
Aguié Commune is the seat of the Department of the same name, one of five-second level administrative subdivisions of the Maradi Region. Among the Commune subdivisions within the Department are the "Rural Communes" of Saé Saboua, Arnagou and Giratawa. Nearby villages include Dan Kiri, Dan Gao, Gamji Karama, Dan Rago, Doromawa, Guidan Tonio, and Guidan Kodao.

== Population ==
A primarily Hausa populated region, it is bordered to the south by Katsina State, Nigeria. The 2012 population of Aguié Commune was 152,788. The Maradi Region is one of the most densely populated areas of Niger, home to 20 per cent of the country's population, mostly small farmers in rural settlements.

== Transport ==
Aguié lies on the main east-west highway between Maradi and Zinder. It is also 50 km (30 mi) north of the city of Katsina, Nigeria, in an area of much cross-border trade and population movement.

== 2005–06 Niger food crisis ==
Aguié Department was particularly hard hit in the 2005-06 Niger food crisis, and the town became a centre for aid efforts. International rural health and development projects have continued to be based there.
