= List of World Heritage Sites in Africa =

The United Nations Educational, Scientific and Cultural Organization (UNESCO) designates World Heritage Sites of outstanding universal value to cultural or natural heritage which have been nominated by signatories to the 1972 UNESCO World Heritage Convention. Cultural heritage consists of monuments (such as architectural works, monumental sculptures, or inscriptions), groups of buildings, and sites (including archaeological sites). Natural heritage includes natural features (consisting of physical and biological formations), geological and physiographical formations (including habitats of threatened species of animals and plants), and natural sites that are important from the point of view of science, conservation or natural beauty. UNESCO lists sites under ten criteria; each entry must meet at least one of the criteria. Criteria i through vi are cultural, and vii through x are natural. The implementation of the World Heritage Convention, the addition or removal of properties from the World Heritage List, and the allocation of funds, among other responsibilities, are managed by the World Heritage Committee. There are twenty-one state members on the committee. Although a term is a maximum of six years, most state parties choose to relinquish their responsibilities after four years so other countries can have the opportunity to be a member of the committee.

Africa is one of the five regions defined by UNESCO, alongside the Arab States, Asia and the Pacific, Europe and North America, and Latin America and the Caribbean. It consists of 47 Sub-Saharan African nations that have accepted the World Heritage Convention, making their historical sites eligible for inclusion on the list as World Heritage sites. The region has 115 properties on the World Heritage List. Of those properties, 65 were inscribed for their cultural significance, 45 for their natural significance, and 5 for both their natural and cultural significance–being termed mixed sites. There are currently 12 World Heritage Sites in Africa that are endangered.

In addition to sites inscribed on the World Heritage List, member states can maintain a list of tentative sites that they may consider for nomination. Nominations for the World Heritage List are only accepted if the site was previously listed on the tentative list. The Africa region has 300 properties on the tentative list.

Location of World Heritage Sites in Africa. Red dots represent cultural sites, green triangles represent natural sites, and blue squares represent mixed sites. Purple dots represent the Ancient Ferrous Metallurgy Sites. Black dots represent the Sudanese style mosques. Gold dots represent the Memorial sites of the Genocide: Nyamata, Murambi, Gisozi and Bisesero. Cyan dots are the sites of the Bassari Country. Dark green dots are the sites of Senegambian stone circles, two of which are in The Gambia. Orange dots indicate the Fossil Hominid Sites, and yellow dots indicate the Pleistocene Occupation Sites. Pink dots represent the Nelson Mandela Legacy Sites.

African state parties by World Heritage Sites and criteria, tentative listings, and World Heritage Committee service
State	Cultural	Natural	Mixed	Total	Tentative	Service on World Heritage Committee	Date joined	Ref
Angola	1	0	0	1	4	1 time	7 November 1991	
Benin	2	1	0	3	5	2 times	14 June 1982	
Botswana	1	1	0	2	7	0 times	23 November 1998	
Burkina Faso	3	1	0	4	8	1 time	2 April 1987	
Burundi	0	0	0	0	10	0 times	19 May 1982	
Cabo Verde	1	0	0	1	8	0 times	28 April 1988	
Cameroon	1	2	0	3	17	0 times	7 December 1982	
Central African Republic	0	2	0	2	9	0 times	22 December 1980	
Chad	0	1	1	2	7	0 times	23 June 1999	
Comoros	1	0	0	1	12	0 times	27 September 2000	
Congo	0	2	0	2	3	0 times	10 December 1987	
Côte d'Ivoire	2	3	0	5	2	0 times	9 January 1981	
Democratic Republic of the Congo	0	5	0	5	5	1 time	23 September 1974	
Djibouti	0	0	0	0	10	0 times	30 August 2007	
Equatorial Guinea	0	0	0	0	0	0 times	10 March 2010	
Eritrea	1	0	0	1	1	3 times	24 October 2001	
Eswatini	0	0	0	0	1	0 times	30 November 2005	
Ethiopia	10	2	0	12	6	2 times	6 July 1977	
Gabon	0	1	1	2	6	0 times	30 December 1986	
Gambia	2	0	0	2	2	0 times	1 July 1987	
Ghana	2	0	0	2	6	1 time	4 July 1975	
Guinea	0	1	0	1	8	1 time	18 March 1979	
Guinea-Bissau	0	1	0	1	0	1 time	28 January 2006	
Kenya	5	3	0	8	21	2 times	5 June 1991	
Lesotho	0	0	1	1	1	0 times	25 November 2003	
Liberia	0	0	0	0	3	0 times	28 March 2002	
Madagascar	1	2	0	3	7	1 time	19 July 1983	
Malawi	2	1	0	3	7	1 time	5 January 1982	
Mali	3	0	1	4	15	2 times	5 April 1977	
Mauritius	2	0	0	2	1	1 time	19 September 1995	
Mozambique	1	1	0	2	3	0 times	27 November 1982	
Namibia	1	1	0	2	8	0 times	6 April 2000	
Niger	1	2	0	3	19	1 time	23 December 1974	
Nigeria	2	0	0	2	13	4 times	23 October 1974	
Rwanda	1	1	0	2	0	1 time	28 December 2000	
Sao Tome and Principe	1	0	0	1	1	0 times	25 July 2006	
Senegal	5	2	0	7	8	5 times	13 February 1976	
Seychelles	0	2	0	2	2	0 times	9 April 1980	
Sierra Leone	0	1	0	1	4	0 times	7 January 2005	
Somalia	0	0	0	0	3	0 times	23 July 2020	
South Africa	7	4	1	12	1	3 times	10 July 1997	
South Sudan	0	1	0	1	2	0 times	9 March 2016	
Tanzania	3	3	1	7	7	3 times	2 August 1977	
Togo	1	0	0	1	4	1 time	15 April 1998	
Uganda	1	2	0	3	8	1 time	20 November 1987	
Zambia	0	1	0	1	7	1 time	4 June 1984	
Zimbabwe	3	2	0	5	5	2 times	16 August 1982	

== Angola ==
=== World Heritage Sites ===
- Mbanza Kongo, Vestiges of the Capital of the former Kingdom of Kongo

=== Tentative list ===
- Archaeological site of Tchitundu-Hulu
- Cuito Canavale, site of liberation and independence
- Kwanza Corridor-Cultural Landscape
- Okavango Delta (Cubango-Okavango-Cuando-Zambezi catchments)

== Benin ==
=== World Heritage Sites ===
- Royal Palaces of Abomey
- Koutammakou, the Land of the Batammariba
- W-Arly-Pendjari Complex

=== Tentative list ===
- Porto-Novo village: old quarters and Royal Palace
- W Reserve of Niger and the vernacular habitat of northern Benin
- Agongointo-Zoungoudo Underground Town
- Lower Ouémé Valley
- Highlights of the Slave Route in Benin

== Botswana ==
=== World Heritage Sites ===
- Tsodilo
- Okavango Delta

=== Tentative list ===
- Toutswemogala Hill Iron Age Settlement
- Central Kalahari Game Reserve
- Chobe Linyanti System
- Mapungubwe Cultural Landscape
- Gcwihaba Caves
- Makgadikgadi Pans Landscape
- Tswapong Hills Cultural Landscape

== Burkina Faso ==
=== World Heritage Sites ===
- Ruins of Loropéni
- W-Arly-Pendjari Complex
- Ancient Ferrous Metallurgy Sites of Burkina Faso
- Royal Court of Tiébélé

=== Tentative list ===
- Bourzanga necropolises
- Rock engravings of the Burkinabè Sahel: Pobé-Mengao, Arbinda and Markoye
- Rock art in Burkina Faso
- Classified forest of Mare aux Hippopotames
- La Maison du Peuple
- Sudanese style mosques in Burkina Faso
- Sya, Historic Center of Bobo-Dioulasso
- The Architectural Village of Koumi

== Burundi ==
=== World Heritage Sites ===
As of 2025, Burundi does not have any sites inscribed on the World Heritage List.

=== Tentative list ===
- Rusizi natural reserve
- Gasumo, the southernmost source of the Nile
- The sacred natural landscapes of Muramvya, Mpotsa and Nkiko-Mugamba
- The Lakes of Northern Burundi
- Kibira National Park
- The Karera Falls
- Ruvubu National Park
- The Nyakazu Fault
- Lake Tanganyika
- Royal Residence of Gishora

== Cabo Verde ==
=== World Heritage Sites ===
- Cidade Velha, Historic Centre of Ribeira Grande

=== Tentative list ===
- Nova Sintra Historic Centre
- Fogo Natural Park-Chã das Caldeiras
- Complex of protected areas of Santa Luzia, Branco and Raso Islands
- Tarrafal concentration camp
- Praia Historic Center
- São Filipe Historic Center
- Cova-Paul-Ribeira da Torre Natural Park
- Pedra de Lume salt works

== Cameroon ==
=== World Heritage Sites ===
- Dja Faunal Reserve
- Sangha Trinational
- Diy-Gid-Biy Cultural Landscape of the Mandara Mountains

=== Tentative list ===
- Boumba Bek and Nki National Parks Complex
- Bouba Njida National Park
- Campo Ma'an National Park
- Waza National Park
- The Bahut chiefdom
- Tower of Goto Goulfey
- Bidzar petroglyphs
- Megaliths of Djohong
- Megaliths of Saa
- Njock Rail Tunnels
- Palace of Rey Bouba
- Lobé Falls Cultural Landscape
- Shum Laka Archaeological Site
- "Grandes Cases" of the traditional chiefdoms of the Grassfields region
- Lake Chad cultural landscape
- Cross River-Korup-Takamanda
- Bimbia and associated sites

== Central African Republic ==
=== World Heritage Sites ===
- Manovo-Gounda St. Floris National Park
- Sangha Trinational

=== Tentative list ===
- The Bouar Megaliths
- The Tata (fortified palace) of Sultan Sénoussi, the caves of Kaga-Kpoungouvou, and the city of Ndélé
- Paleo-metallurgical sites of Bangui
- Lengo Petroglyphs
- Remains of the Zinga train
- Mbaéré Bodingué Integral Reserve
- Mbi Falls
- Hill, plain, Oubangui river and the colonial heritage of Bangui
- Pygmy forest and residential camps of Central African Republic

== Chad ==
=== World Heritage Sites ===
- Lakes of Ounianga
- Ennedi Massif: Natural and Cultural Landscape

=== Tentative list ===
- Begon II metallurgical site
- Hominid sites in Djourab
- Ruins of Ouara
- The Curious Iron Mines of Télé-Nugar
- Petroglyphs and rock paintings of Ennedi and Tibesti
- Zakouma National Park
- Lake Chad cultural landscape

== Comoros ==
=== World Heritage Sites ===
- Medinas of the Historical Sultanates of the Comoros

=== Tentative list ===
- Marine Ecosystems in the Comoros Archipelago
- Terrestrial Ecosystems and Cultural Landscape in the Comoros Archipelago
- Cultural landscape of the Perfume Plantations of the Islands of the Moon

== Congo ==
=== World Heritage Sites ===
- Sangha Trinational
- Forest Massif of Odzala-Kokoua

=== Tentative list ===
- Loango ancient slavery harbour
- Mbé Royal Domain
- Conkouati-Douli National Park

== Côte d'Ivoire ==
=== World Heritage Sites ===
- Mount Nimba Strict Nature Reserve
- Taï National Park
- Comoé National Park
- Historic Town of Grand-Bassam
- Sudanese style mosques in northern Côte d'Ivoire

=== Tentative list ===
- Îles Ehotilé National Park
- Ahouakro Archaeological Park

== Democratic Republic of the Congo ==
=== World Heritage Sites ===
- Virunga National Park
- Garamba National Park
- Kahuzi-Biéga National Park
- Salonga National Park
- Okapi Wildlife Reserve

=== Tentative list ===
- Dimba and Ngovo caves
- Matupi Cave
- Upemba Depression
- Lomami National Park
- Garamba National Park

== Djibouti ==
=== World Heritage Sites ===
As of 2025, Djibouti does not have any sites inscribed on the World Heritage List.

=== Tentative list ===
- The Tumulus (Awellos)
- The Rock Engravings of Abourma
- The historic urban landscape of Djibouti City and its specific buildings
- Lake Assal
- Moucha and Maskali Islands
- The Natural Landscapes of the Obock Region
- Day Forest National Park
- Assamo Terrestrial Protected Area
- Djalélo Protected Natural Area
- Lake Abbeh: its cultural landscape, natural monuments, and ecosystem

== Equatorial Guinea ==
As of 2025, Equatorial Guinea does not have any sites inscribed on the World Heritage List, and it does not maintain any sites on its tentative list.

== Eritrea ==
=== World Heritage Sites ===
- Asmara: A Modernist African City

=== Tentative list ===
- Qohaito Cultural Landscape

== Eswatini ==
=== World Heritage Sites ===
As of 2025, Eswatini does not have any sites inscribed on the World Heritage List.

=== Tentative list ===
- Ngwenya Mines

== Ethiopia ==
=== World Heritage Sites ===
- Simien National Park
- Rock-Hewn Churches, Lalibela
- Fasil Ghebbi, Gondar Region
- Aksum
- Lower Valley of the Awash
- Tiya
- Lower Valley of the Omo
- Harar Jugol, the Fortified Historic Town
- Konso Cultural Landscape
- Bale Mountains National Park
- Gedeo Cultural Landscape
- Melka Kunture and Balchit: Archaeological and Palaeontological Sites in the Highland Area of Ethiopia

=== Tentative list ===
- Dirre Sheik Hussein Religious, Cultural and Historical Site
- Holqa Sof Omar: Natural and Cultural Heritage (Sof Omar: Caves of Mystery)
- Sacred Landscapes of Tigray
- The Cultural Heritage of Yeha
- Lake Tana Island Monasteries and its Adjacent Wetland Natural and Cultural Heritages
- Simien Mountains National Park (SMNP)

== Gabon ==
=== World Heritage Sites ===
- Ecosystem and Relict Cultural Landscape of Lopé-Okanda
- Ivindo National Park

=== Tentative list ===
- Moukalaba-Doudou National Park
- Lastoursville caves
- Moulendé fossil site and the Bangombé nuclear pile
- Birougou Mountains National Park
- Batéké Plateau National Park
- Loango National Park

== Gambia ==
=== World Heritage Sites ===
- Kunta Kinteh Island and Related Sites
- Stone Circles of Senegambia

=== Tentative list ===
- Wassu Stone Circles Quarry Site
- Historic Georgetown

== Ghana ==
=== World Heritage Sites ===
- Forts and Castles, Volta, Greater Accra, Central and Western Regions
- Asante Traditional Buildings

=== Tentative list ===
- Mole National Park
- Tenzug - Tallensi settlements
- Navrongo Catholic Cathedral
- Trade Pilgrimage Routes of North-Western Ghana
- Kakum National Park (Assin Attandanso Reserve)

== Guinea ==
=== World Heritage Sites ===
- Mount Nimba Strict Nature Reserve

=== Tentative list ===
- The vernacular architecture and Mandinka cultural landscape of Gberedou/Hamana
- Mount Nimba Cultural Landscape
- Slave route in Africa, segment of Timbo, Pongo River
- The coronation hut of the Almamy of Fouta Djallon
- Badiar National Park (PNB)
- Niani, medieval city, ancient capital of the Mali Empire
- Cultural Landscape of Bassari
- Fouta Djallon Massif

== Guinea-Bissau ==
=== World Heritage Sites ===
- Coastal and Marine Ecosystems of the Bijagós Archipelago – Omatí Minhô

=== Tentative list ===
Guinea-Bissau does not maintain any sites on its tentative list.

== Kenya ==
=== World Heritage Sites ===
- Fort Jesus, Mombasa
- Kenya Lake System in the Great Rift Valley
- Lake Turkana National Parks
- Lamu Old Town
- Mount Kenya National Park/Natural Forest
- Sacred Mijikenda Kaya Forests
- Thimlich Ohinga Archaeological Site
- The Historic Town and Archaeological Site of Gedi

=== Tentative list ===
- The Meru Conservation Area
- The Tana Delta and Forests Complex
- The African Great Rift Valley – The Maasai Mara
- Amboseli National Park
- Coastal Forests of Kenya (Arabuko Sokoke Forest and Shimba Hills National Reserve)
- Eastern Arc Mountains, Kenya
- Hell's Gate National Park
- Kakamega Forest
- Kilifi Caves (Panga Ya Saidi, Mawe Meru, and Chasimba Caves)
- The Marakwet Escarpment Furrow Irrigation System
- Maasai Mara Game Reserve
- Meru Conservation Area
- Mfangano Island Rock Art Sites
- Mt. Elgon Ecosystem
- Mt. Marsabit National Park and Reserve
- Mt Kulal Biosphere Reserve
- Nyandarua Mountains
- Olorgesailie Prehistoric Site
- The Stone Pillar Sites of Turkana Basin
- Geometric rock art in Lake Victoria Region of Kenya, Tanzania, and Uganda

== Lesotho ==
=== World Heritage Sites ===
- Maloti-Drakensberg Park

=== Tentative list ===
- Botho, Diplomacy and Peace - Basotho Nation-building Cluster of Sites

== Liberia ==
=== World Heritage Sites ===
As of 2025, Liberia does not have any sites inscribed on the World Heritage List.

=== Tentative list ===
- Mount Nimba Strict Reserve (extension)
- Providence Island
- Gola Rainforest National Park (extension)

== Madagascar ==
=== World Heritage Sites ===
- Andrefana Dry Forests
- Royal Hill of Ambohimanga
- Rainforests of the Atsinanana

=== Tentative list ===
- Mahafaly country of Southwestern Madagascar
- Anjanaharibe-Sud Special Reserve: Extension of the Rainforests of the Atsinanana
- Upper Town of Antananarivo
- Former industrial site of Mantasoa
- Sainte-Marie Catholic church of Ambodifototra
- Nosy Lonjo of Antsiranana
- NOSYnakà (Sahamalaza, Nosy Hara, Nosy Tanikely, Lokobe, Ambodivahibe, Ankarea, Ankivonjy)

== Malawi ==
=== World Heritage Sites ===
- Lake Malawi National Park
- Chongoni Rock-Art Area
- Mount Mulanje Cultural Landscape

=== Tentative list ===
- Khulubvi and Associated Mbona Rain Shrines Cultural Landscape
- Fort Mangochi and Makanjira Historical Corridor
- Karonga Fossilised Geoheritage Landscape
- Lake Chilwa Wetland
- Nyika-Vwaza Wildlife Reserve
- Malawi Slave Heritage Route and Dr. David Livingstone Trail
- Malape Pillars Geological Heritage

== Mali ==
=== World Heritage Sites ===
- Old Towns of Djenné
- Timbuktu
- Cliff of Bandiagara (Land of the Dogons)
- Tomb of Askia

=== Tentative list ===
- Boucle du Baoulé
- Es-Souk
- Hamdullahi Historic City
- Médine Fort
- Great Friday Mosque of Niono
- Komoguel Mosque
- Tata of Sikasso
- Biosphere Reserve of Bafing Makana Park
- Lake Magui Nature Reserve
- Gourma Elephant Biodiversity Reserve
- Niger River Basin (from the Markala threshold to Lake Débo)
- Bamako Cathedral
- Mandiakuy Church
- Historical Sites and Cultural Landscapes of Manden
- Mosque of Kankou Moussa in Gao

== Mauritius ==
=== World Heritage Sites ===
- Aapravasi Ghat
- Le Morne Cultural Landscape

=== Tentative list ===
- Black River Gorges National Park

== Mozambique ==
=== World Heritage Sites ===
- Island of Mozambique
- iSimangaliso Wetland Park – Maputo National Park

=== Tentative list ===
- Manyikeni and Chibuene
- The Quirimbas Archipelago
- Vumba Mountain Range

== Namibia ==
=== World Heritage Sites ===
- Twyfelfontein or /Ui-//aes
- Namib Sand Sea

=== Tentative list ===
- Brandberg National Monument Area
- Fishriver Canyon
- Welwitschia Plains
- Benguela Current Marine Ecosystem Sites
- Etosha Pan
- Sān Living Cultural Landscape
- Succulent Karoo Protected Areas
- Okavango Delta

== Niger ==
=== World Heritage Sites ===
- Air and Ténéré Natural Reserves
- W-Arly-Pendjari Complex
- Historic Centre of Agadez

=== Tentative list ===
- Old City of Zinder, Birni district and the Sultanate
- Palace of the Zarmakoye of Dosso
- Earthen Mosques of the Tahoua Region
- Salt Route of the Sahara Desert
- Plateau and Fortifications of Djado
- Bura Archaeological Site
- Lougou Site
- Giraffe Zone
- Termit Massif
- Gadabedji Faunal Reserve
- Protected Forests of the Agadez Region
- Mare d'Ossolo
- Nigerien part of Lake Chad
- Niger River, islands and valley
- W National Park, archaeological sites
- Air and Ténéré Natural Reserves, cultural extension
- Dinosaur deposits of Niger
- The Classified Forest, the Madarounfa Lake and the Tombs of the 99 saints
- Lake Chad cultural landscape

== Nigeria ==
=== World Heritage Sites ===
- Sukur Cultural Landscape
- Osun-Osogbo Sacred Grove

=== Tentative list ===
- Benin Iya / Sungbo' s Eredo
- Old Oyo
- Kwiambana and/or Ningi
- Niger Delta Mangroves
- Oke Idanre (Idanre Hill)
- Arochkwu Long Juju Slave Route (Cave Temple Complex)
- Ancient Kano City Walls and Associated Sites
- Surame Cultural Landscape
- Alok Ikom Stone Monoliths
- Ogbunike Caves
- Cross River-Korup-Takamanda
- Lake Chad cultural landscape
- Gashaka Gumti National Park

== Rwanda ==
=== World Heritage Sites ===
- Memorial sites of the Genocide: Nyamata, Murambi, Gisozi and Bisesero
- Nyungwe National Park

=== Tentative list ===
Rwanda does not maintain any sites on its tentative list.

== São Tomé and Príncipe ==
=== World Heritage Sites ===
- The Roças of Sao Tome and Principe: Colonial Agricultural System and Forced Migration

=== Tentative list ===
- Volcanic islands of Sao Tome and Principe

== Senegal ==
=== World Heritage Sites ===
- Island of Gorée
- Djoudj National Bird Sanctuary
- Niokolo-Koba National Park
- Island of Saint-Louis
- Stone Circles of Senegambia
- Saloum Delta
- Bassari Country: Bassari, Fula and Bedik Cultural Landscapes

=== Tentative list ===
- Aéropostale
- Carabane Island
- Rural architecture of Lower Casamance: Houses with an impluvium of the Bandial Kingdom
- Îles de la Madeleine National Park
- The stopovers on the Senegal River
- Cekeen Tumuli
- Lake Retba
- The old Rufisque

== Seychelles ==
=== World Heritage Sites ===
- Aldabra Atoll
- Vallée de Mai Nature Reserve

=== Tentative list ===
- Mission Ruins of Venn's Town
- Silhouette Island

== Sierra Leone ==
=== World Heritage Sites ===
- Gola-Tiwai Complex

=== Tentative list ===
- Western Area Peninsula National Park
- Old Fourah Bay College Building
- Bunce Island
- The Gateway to the Old King's Yards

== Somalia ==
=== World Heritage Sites ===
As of 2025, Somalia does not have any sites inscribed on the World Heritage list.

=== Tentative list ===
- Bushbushle National Park
- The Hobyo grass and Shrubland
- Mogadishu Secondo-Lido Lighthouse

== South Africa ==
=== World Heritage Sites ===
- Fossil Hominid Sites of South Africa
- Robben Island
- iSimangaliso Wetland Park – Maputo National Park
- Maloti-Drakensberg Park
- Mapungubwe Cultural Landscape
- Cape Floral Region Protected Areas
- Vredefort Dome
- Richtersveld Cultural and Botanical Landscape
- ǂKhomani Cultural Landscape
- Barberton Makhonjwa Mountains
- Human Rights, Liberation and Reconciliation: Nelson Mandela Legacy Sites
- The Emergence of Modern Human Behaviour: The Pleistocene Occupation Sites of South Africa

=== Tentative list ===
- Emakhosini: The Valley of the Zulu Kings

== South Sudan ==
=== World Heritage Sites ===
- Boma-Badingilo Migratory Landscape

=== Tentative list ===
- Deim Zubeir – Slave route site
- Sudd wetland

== Tanzania ==
=== World Heritage Sites ===
- Ngorongoro Conservation Area
- Ruins of Kilwa Kisiwani and Ruins of Songo Mnara
- Serengeti National Park
- Selous Game Reserve
- Kilimanjaro National Park
- Stone Town of Zanzibar
- Kondoa Rock-Art Sites

=== Tentative list ===
- Oldonyo Murwak
- Gombe National Park
- Jozani - Chwaka Bay Conservation Area
- Eastern Arc Mountains Forests of Tanzania
- The Central Slave and Ivory Trade Route
- Tendaguru Paleontological Site (TPS)
- Geometric rock art in Lake Victoria Region of Kenya, Tanzania, and Uganda

== Togo ==
=== World Heritage Sites ===
- Koutammakou, the Land of the Batammariba

=== Tentative list ===
- Aného-Glidji Aglomeration
- Serial Granaries of the caves of Nok, Mamproug, Kouba and Bagou
- Bassar Ancient Iron Metallurgy Sites
- Fazao Malfakassa National Park

== Uganda ==
=== World Heritage Sites ===
- Bwindi Impenetrable National Park
- Rwenzori Mountains National Park
- Tombs of Buganda Kings at Kasubi

=== Tentative list ===
- Bigo bya Mugenyi (Archaeological Earthworks)
- Ntusi (man-made mounds and Basin)
- Nyero and other hunter-gatherer geometric rock
- Mgahinga Gorilla National Park
- Mt. Elgon Transboundary Ecosystem
- Geometric rock art in Lake Victoria Region of Kenya, Tanzania, and Uganda
- Kibiro Salt Producing Village
- Palabek Cultural Landscapes

== Zambia ==
=== World Heritage Sites ===
- Mosi-oa-Tunya / Victoria Falls

=== Tentative list ===
- Dag Hammarskjoeld Memorial (Crash site)
- Kalambo falls archaeological site (prehistoric settlement site)
- Chirundu Fossil Forest
- Mwela Rock Paintings
- Kalambo Falls
- Zambezi Source
- The Barotse Cultural Landscape

== Zimbabwe ==
=== World Heritage Sites ===
- Mana Pools National Park, Sapi and Chewore Safari Areas
- Great Zimbabwe National Monument
- Khami Ruins National Monument
- Mosi-oa-Tunya / Victoria Falls
- Matobo Hills

=== Tentative list ===
- Naletale Cluster of Dzimbabwes
- Gonarezhou National Park
- Ziwa National Monument
- Mavhuradonha Wilderness
- Chimanimani National Park, Eland sanctuary, Rusitu and Haroni botanical reserves
