= List of World Heritage Sites in Niger =

Location of World Heritage Sites in Niger. Blue dots represent natural sites; the red dot is a cultural site.

The United Nations Educational, Scientific and Cultural Organization (UNESCO) World Heritage Sites are places of importance to cultural or natural heritage as described in the UNESCO World Heritage Convention, established in 1972. Cultural heritage consists of monuments (such as architectural works, monumental sculptures, or inscriptions), groups of buildings, and sites (including archaeological sites). Natural features (consisting of physical and biological formations), geological and physiographical formations (including habitats of threatened species of animals and plants), and natural sites which are important from the point of view of science, conservation or natural beauty, are defined as natural heritage. Niger accepted the convention on 23 December 1974, making its historical sites eligible for inclusion on the list.

There are three World Heritage Sites in Niger and a further 19 sites on the tentative list. The W–Arly–Pendjari Complex is shared with Benin and Burkina Faso. The Aïr and Ténéré National Nature Reserve has been listed as endangered since 1992 because of political instability in the region. The Historic Centre of Agadez is a cultural site, the other two are listed for their natural significance. Niger has served on the World Heritage Committee once.

== World Heritage Sites ==
UNESCO lists sites under ten criteria; each entry must meet at least one of the criteria. Criteria i through vi are cultural, and vii through x are natural. There are three World Heritage Sites in Niger.

† In danger
* Transnational site

World Heritage Sites
Site	Image	Location (region)	Year listed	UNESCO data	Description
Air and Ténéré Natural Reserves†	Rocks of a bluish colour among desert sand	Agadez	1991	573; vii, ix, x (natural)	The large protected area comprises parts of the Aïr Mountains, with its isolated Sahelian flora and fauna, and parts of the Ténéré desert, with shifting sandy dunes that are constantly changing the landscape. The area features mountains of blue marble (pictured) which are an important stop for migratory birds crossing the Sahara. The reserves are home to three antelope species: the addax, dorcas gazelle, and rhim. The site has been listed as endangered since 1992 because of political instability in the region.
W–Arly–Pendjari Complex*	Five elephants in a muddy river	Tillabéri	1996	749ter; ix, x (natural)	This site comprises the W National Park (elephants in the park pictured), which was initially listed independently in Niger in 1996, and Arli National Park in Burkina Faso and Pendjari National Park in Benin, which were added in 2017. The area covers large expanses of Sudano-Sahelian savanna with grasslands, wood savanna, shrublands, riparian forests, and gallery forests. The landscape has been shaped by human activity for tens of thousands of years, with fires being crucial for maintaining diverse vegetation. The parks are home to healthy populations of large mammals, including African elephant, lion, cheetah, African wild dog, and topi antelope.
Historic Centre of Agadez	A large minaret in mudbrick	Agadez	2013	1268; ii, iii (cultural)	Agadez was historically important as the "gateway to the desert", being located at the crossroads of caravan trade routes. The historic centre dates to the 15th and 16th centuries under the Sultanate of Aïr. The city is known for its mudbrick architecture, including the Agadez Mosque. Its minaret, the tallest mudbrick structure in the world, is pictured.

== Tentative list ==
In addition to sites inscribed on the World Heritage List, member states can maintain a list of tentative sites that they may consider for nomination. Nominations for the World Heritage List are only accepted if the site was previously listed on the tentative list. Niger maintains 19 properties on its tentative list.

Tentative sites
Site	Image	Location (Region)	Year listed	UNESCO criteria	Description
Old City of Zinder, Birni district and the Sultanate	Mudbrick buildings with decorated walls	Zinder	2006	(cultural)	Zinder was the capital of the Sultanate of Damagaram, founded in the first half of the 18th century. It was located on an important trade route between Niamey and Chad. It served as the capital of Niger in the early 20th century. The Birni district, dating to the 18th and 19th centuries, comprises several important buildings with decorated walls, as well as seven city gates.
Palace of the Zarmakoye of Dosso	A mudbrick palace with painted walls	Dosso	2006	(cultural)	The palace in Dosso was constructed in the early 20th century for the provincial chiefs of the Dosso Kingdom. The palace is surrounded by walls and has tombs of its former rulers. It is well preserved.
Earthen Mosques of the Tahoua Region	A mudbrick mosque	Tahoua	2006	(cultural)	This nomination comprises several mudbrick mosques and other buildings, constructed in the second half of the 20th century by architect Elhadj Mamoudou and his apprentice Elhadj Habou. The Yamma Mosque received the 1986 Aga Khan Award for Architecture. The mosque in Salewa is pictured.
Cultural Routes of the Sahara Desert: Salt Road	Oasis with palm trees	Agadez	2006	(cultural)	This nomination comprises sites along the Trans-Saharan routes, where the main exchange was salt and dates for millet. Caravan routes had to cross demanding terrains, including the Ténéré desert, and were exposed to raids by different hostiles. The oases of Kaouar have salt deposits where salt and natron are extracted. Bilma oasis is pictured.
Plateau and Fortifications of Djado	Ruins surrounded by some palm trees	Agadez	2006	i, iii (cultural)	Djado is an ancient fortified city that has long been abandoned. The buildings were made in dry stone and clay. The hyper-arid Djado Plateau is an important migratory route for the addax.
Bura Archaeological Site	Museum piece of a stone sculpture on a black background	Tillaberi	2006	(cultural)	Several necropolises in Bura belong to the Bura culture that has been dated to last from the 3rd to 13th centuries CE. The site was then covered by sand and rediscovered in 1975. Archaeological findings include different types of funerary urns, usually surmounted by heads of anthropoid statuettes with a generally anthropomorphic shape. They include some equestrian figures. The site has been heavily affected by looting. A museum display of an artifact from the culture is pictured.
Lougou Site		Dosso	2006	vii (cultural)	Lougou was a place of worship of the animist subgroup of the Hausa people and there are several sites of religious importance. It was also the site of the Battle of Lougou in 1899 where the French of the Voulet–Chanoine Mission defeated the queen/priestess Sarraounia.
Giraffe Zone	A giraffe among trees	Dosso , Tillaberi	2006	ix (natural)	The area is part of the W National Park and is the last home of the West African giraffe (specimen pictured). Giraffes were common in West Africa in the early 20th century but had almost completely disappeared from the region by the 1950s because of poaching and deforestation. The landscape includes tree savanna and shrub savanna.
Termit Massif	Desert with some trees and camels	Diffa, Zinder	2006	vii (natural)	The area is a desert and a steppe. There are two seasons, dry and rainy, but the precipitation is low. It is home to the endangered addax, dama gazelle, dorcas gazelle, and Northwest African cheetah.
Gadabedji Faunal Reserve	A tree and some mud on the ground	Maradi	2006	ix (natural)	The reserve was established to protect the population of the Scimitar oryx that has since been declared extinct in the country. It is home to the dorcas gazelle, common patas monkey, fennec fox, and several bird and reptile species. There are rivers with gallery forests and several temporary ponds.
Protected Forests of the Agadez Region		Agadez	2006	vii, x (natural)	Steppe forests grow on flood-prone areas. Common tree species include Vachellia flava, Vachellia nilotica, Balanites aegyptiaca, and Hyphaene thebaica, also called doum palm. The latter is important for the locals who use fruit for food and palm leaves to make mats and ropes.
Mare d’Ossolo	A pond with some trees around	Tillaberi	2006	ix (natural)	The wetland supports diverse Sahelian flora and fauna. The predominant tree species is the Vachellia nilotica. During the rainy season, water floods large parts of the area. There are numerous water and migratory bird species present. The area has a good potential for beekeeping. Communities that live here practice fishing.
Nigerien part of Lake Chad	Satellite image of Lake Chad, a green area in the middle of a desert landscape	Diffa	2006	vii (natural)	Lake Chad (satellite image pictured) is an endorheic lake that receives water from several tributaries. It is rich in fish biodiversity, with around 120 recorded species. The lake is rapidly drying as a consequence of climate change. People living in the area practice fishing and pastoralism.
Niger River, islands and valley	A fisherman on the river	Dosso, Niamey, Tillaberi	2006	vii, ix (mixed)	Niger (the country) comprises about a fifth of the Niger river catchment basin. The river is an important waterway for transport of cargo and people, however not all parts are navigable at all times. Wildlife along the river includes the hippopotamus, manatee, different antelopes, and carnivores. There are 14 islands with cultural sites, dating to different historical periods, including from the 1st century CE. People in the area practice fishing, agriculture, and livestock farming.
W National Park, archaeological sites		Tillaberi	2006	i, iii, iv (cultural)	This nomination focuses on the cultural aspects of the W National Park, already listed for its natural significance. There are numerous archaeological sites in the park, spanning from the Paleolithic period to the appearance of an iron metallurgy.
Aïr and Ténéré National Nature Reserve	Rock carving depicting animals, including giraffe	Agadez	2006	(cultural)	This nomination focuses on the cultural aspects of the Aïr and Ténéré National Nature Reserve, already listed for its natural significance. There are rock carvings (example pictured) and sites of early copper and iron metallurgy.
Dinosaur deposits of Niger	A museum display of a skeleton of a very large crocodyliform	Agadez	2006	ix (mixed)	There are several geological formations in Niger that are rich in dinosaur and other fossils from the Late Triassic to the Early Cretaceous. The most important is the Elrhaz Formation. Several skeletons are now on display in Musée National Boubou Hama. A Sarcosuchus skeleton mounted in the National Museum of Natural History in Paris is pictured.
The Classified Forest, the Madarounfa Lake and the Tombs of the 99 saints	Trees by a lake and a passing cattle heard	Maradi	2006	vii (mixed)	The forest preserves the wooded savanna trees, such as the tamarind, Mitragyna, and Terminalia leiocarpa. The lake (pictured) is important for water birds. Along the shores of the lake, there are several tombs of people that are venerated as saints by the locals.
Lake Chad cultural landscape*	A fisherman waving at the lake shore	Diffa	2018	ii, iii, vii, ix (mixed)	The area has been historically important as a meeting point of cultures and a crossroads of trade routes. Sedentary and nomad communities met here. In the 5th century BCE, the Sao civilisation flourished here, producing terracotta artifacts. Fishing has been an important activity through history. From the natural perspective, the area has a mosaic habitat of wetlands, shrub savanna, and steppe. The lake supports a diverse fish fauna, with around 120 recorded species. The nomination is shared with Nigeria, Cameroon, and Chad.
