= List of World Heritage Sites in Côte d'Ivoire =

Location of World Heritage Sites in Côte d'Ivoire. Blue dots indicate the Sudanese style mosques.

The United Nations Educational, Scientific and Cultural Organization (UNESCO) World Heritage Sites are places of importance to cultural or natural heritage as described in the UNESCO World Heritage Convention, established in 1972. Cultural heritage consists of monuments (such as architectural works, monumental sculptures, or inscriptions), groups of buildings, and sites (including archaeological sites). Natural features (consisting of physical and biological formations), geological and physiographical formations (including habitats of threatened species of animals and plants), and natural sites which are important from the point of view of science, conservation or natural beauty are defined as natural heritage. Côte d'Ivoire, also known as Ivory Coast, accepted the convention on 9 January 1981, making its historical sites eligible for inclusion on the list.

There are five World Heritage Sites in Côte d'Ivoire, and a further two on the tentative list. The first site listed was Mount Nimba Strict Nature Reserve in 1982, as an extension of a site that was listed in Guinea the year prior. The most recent listing was the site Sudanese style mosques in northern Côte d'Ivoire, in 2021. Two sites are listed for their cultural and three for their natural significance. Mount Nimba was listed as endangered in 1992 because of planned ore mining in the park area and the arrival of large numbers of refugees on the Guinean side. Comoé National Park was listed as endangered in 2003 because of the impact of civil unrest on the property, including lack of management and drop in large mammal populations due to poaching. As the situation improved, the site was removed from the endangered list in 2017.

== World Heritage Sites ==
UNESCO lists sites under ten criteria; each entry must meet at least one of the criteria. Criteria i through vi are cultural, and vii through x are natural.

† In danger

* Transnational site

World Heritage Sites
| Site | Image | Location (district) | Year listed | UNESCO data | Description |
|---|---|---|---|---|---|
| Mount Nimba Strict Nature Reserve†* | Mountain scenery in tropical setting | Montagnes | 1982 | 155bis; ix, x (natural) | The Nimba Range, with the highest peak at 1,752 m (5,748 ft), rises high above the surrounding savanna. It is a sky island with a variety of local microclimates, supporting rich endemic flora and fauna. It is home to threatened species such as the Nimba otter shrew, viviparous toads Nimbaphrynoides, and a community of chimpanzees that use stone tools. The site is shared with Guinea, where it was initially independently listed in 1981. The Ivorian part was added in 1982. In 1992, the site was listed as endangered because of planned ore mining in the park area and the arrival of large numbers of refugees on the Guinean side. |
| Taï National Park | Tropical trees in a fog | Bas-Sassandra | 1982 | 195bis; ix, x (natural) | The park contains the last remnants of primary tropical rainforests that once stretched across West Africa. The vegetation is predominantly dense evergreen ombrophilous (capable of living in areas with a high rainfall) forest. It is rich in biodiversity, with over 150 endemic plant species. It is home to 11 species of monkeys, as well as the giant pangolin, African elephant, pygmy hippopotamus, and several duiker species, including the Jentink's duiker. A minor boundary modification took place in 2023. |
| Comoé National Park | River, grasses, and shrubs | Zanzan, Savanes | 1983 | 227bis; ix, x (natural) | The park spreads along the Komoé River, which supports growth of vegetation, such as the pristine tropical rainforest, that is usually found much more south. The habitats also include savannas, gallery forests, and riparian grasslands. Rich in biodiversity, the park is home to the African wild dog, chimpanzee, African elephant, and 500 bird species. From 2003 to 2017, the site was listed as endangered because of the impact of civil unrest on the property, including lack of management and drop in large mammal populations due to poaching. A minor boundary modification took place in 2023. |
| Historic Town of Grand-Bassam | Historical building in colonial style, palms nearby | Comoé | 2012 | 1322rev; iii, iv (cultural) | Grand-Bassam was constructed by the French as their first colonial capital in the country in the 1880s. Until the 1950s, it served as the most important port and trading hub of the country, and attracted people from Africa, Europe, and Middle East. The architecture reflects the interactions of colonial influences adjusted to local tropical climate. The city also includes a Nzema fishing village which demonstrates continuity with local traditions. |
| Sudanese style mosques in northern Côte d'Ivoire | A mosque with a minaret in Sudano-Sahelian style, an old car and people in front | several sites | 2021 | 1648; iii, iv (cultural) | The site comprises eight mosques built mainly between the 17th and 19th centuries in the Sudano-Sahelian style. This architectural style developed in Djenné under the Mali Empire between the 12th and 14th centuries, spread with Islamic merchants and scholars especially after the end of the 16th century, and got adapted to the more humid climate of West Africa. The mosques are mudbrick buildings with projecting wooden frameworks. The mosque in Kong is pictured. |

== Tentative list ==
In addition to sites inscribed on the World Heritage List, member states can maintain a list of tentative sites that they may consider for nomination. Nominations for the World Heritage List are only accepted if the site was previously listed on the tentative list. Côte d'Ivoire maintains two properties on its tentative list.

Tentative sites
| Site | Image | Location (district) | Year listed | UNESCO criteria | Description |
|---|---|---|---|---|---|
| Îles Ehotilé National Park | Palm trees and sandy beach | Comoé | 2006 | (natural) | The park comprises six islands that separate the Aby Lagoon from the Atlantic Ocean. The vegetation mainly consists of mangroves on the coasts and forest inland. The islands support diverse fauna, with 128 species of birds, as well as the straw-coloured fruit bats and manatees. There are several villages on the islands, and the main activity of people is fishing. |
| Ahouakro Archaeological Park | Rock formations among trees | Lagunes | 2006 | iii, v, vii (mixed) | The park, located at the boundary of forest and savanna biomes, features numerous magmatic megaliths of Paleoproterozoic age. These rock formations have been personified with human characters by the local people, some of the formations also have religious significance. There are rock art and tool workshops from the Neolithic period in the park. |
