= Katogo =

Katogo Katoro
- Town and sub-prefecture
- Location in Ivory Coast
- Coordinates: 10°9′N 6°8′W
- Country: Ivory Coast
- District: Savanes
- Region: Poro
- Department: M'Bengué

Population (2014)
  - Total: 14,862
- Time zone: UTC+0 (GMT)

Katogo (also known as Katoro) is a town in the far north of Ivory Coast. It is a sub-prefecture of M'Bengué Department in Poro Region, Savanes District. Seven kilometres north of town is a border crossing with Mali.

Kotogo was a commune until March 2012, when it became one of 1,126 communes nationwide that were abolished.

In 2014, the population of the sub-prefecture of Katogo was 14,862.

== Villages ==
The 14 villages of the sub-prefecture of Katogo and their population in 2014 are:

1. Famitieguele (408)
2. Kafonon (37)
3. Kaniene (830)
4. Kantara (2,042)
5. Kassiolo (382)
6. Katogo (4,451)
7. Kolian (680)
8. N'dienkaha (708)
9. Netoulou (539)
10. N'golokaha (477)
11. Seguebe (525)
12. Solognougo (1,022)
13. Souhouo (547)
14. Tiorotieri (2,214)
