= M'Bengué Department =

Coordinates: 10°0′N 5°54′W

M'Bengué Department Département de M'Bengué
- Department
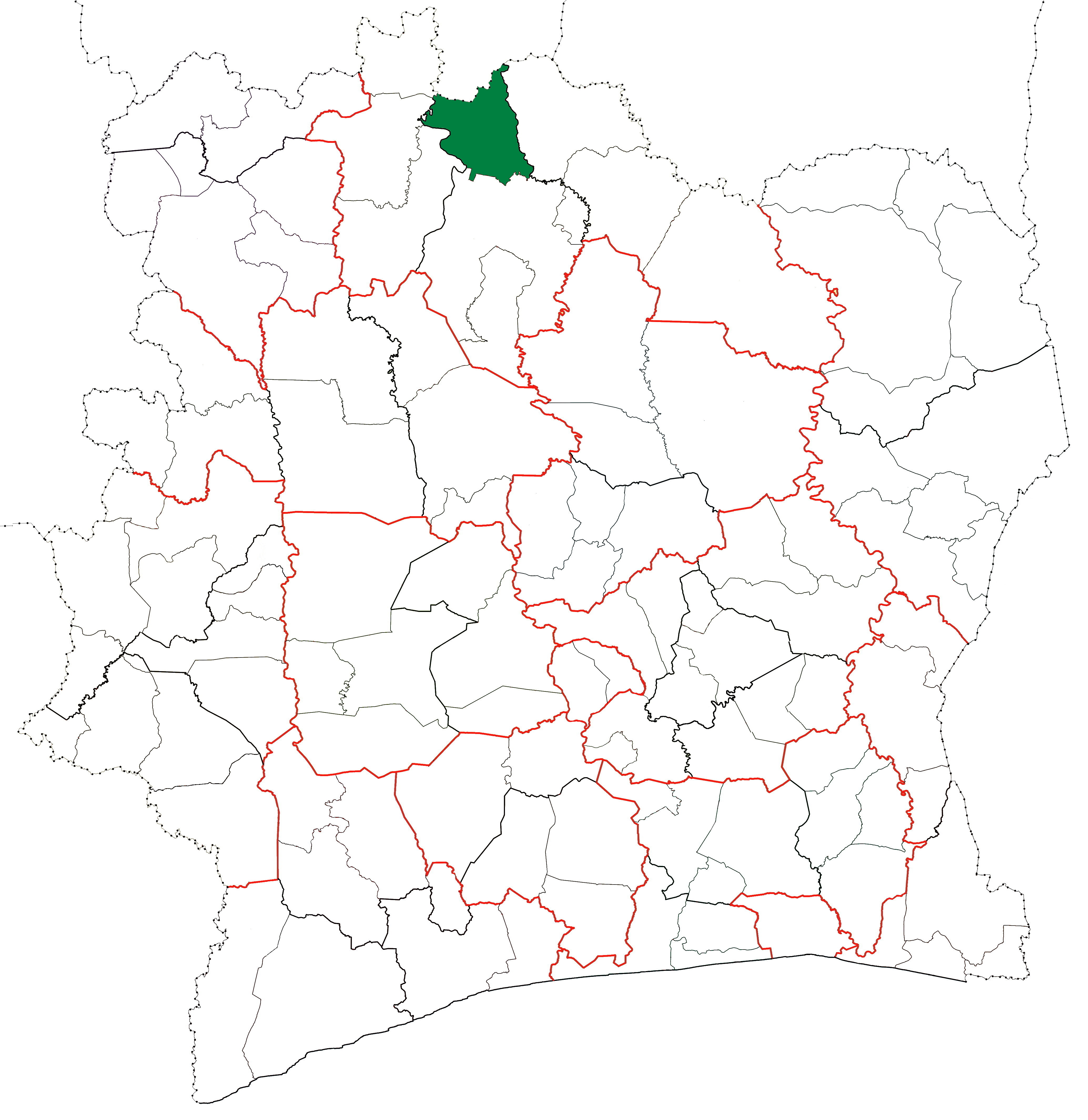
- Location in Ivory Coast. M'Bengué Department has retained the same boundaries since its creation in 2012.
- Country: Ivory Coast
- District: Savanes
- Region: Poro
- 2012: Established via a division of Korhogo Dept
- Departmental seat: M'Bengué

Government
  - Prefect: Raymond Claude Djiké

Area
  - Total: 2,680 km^{2} (1,030 sq mi)

Population (2021 census)
  - Total: 114,971
  - Density: 42.9/km^{2} (111/sq mi)
- Time zone: UTC+0 (GMT)

M'Bengué Department is a department of Poro Region in Savanes District, Ivory Coast. In 2021, its population was 114,971 and its seat is the settlement of M'Bengué. The sub-prefectures of the department are Bougou, Katiali, Katogo, and M'Bengué.

== History ==
M'Bengué Department was created in 2012 by dividing Korhogo Department.
