= Bougou =

- Town and sub-prefecture
- Location in Ivory Coast
- Coordinates: 10°13′N 5°52′W
- Country: Ivory Coast
- District: Savanes
- Region: Poro
- Department: M'Bengué

Population (2014)
  - Total: 14,160
- Time zone: UTC+0 (GMT)

Bougou is a town in the far north of Ivory Coast. It is a sub-prefecture of M'Bengué Department in Poro Region, Savanes District. Five kilometres northwest of town is a border crossing with Mali.

Bougou was a commune until March 2012, when it became one of 1,126 communes nationwide that were abolished.

In 2014, the population of the sub-prefecture of Bougou was 14,160.

== Villages ==
The six villages of the sub-prefecture of Bougou and their population in 2014 are:

1. Bougou (3,583)
2. Loulo (2,729)
3. M'brigue (4,151)
4. N'gandana (2,128)
5. Nongon (952)
6. Tehekaha (617)
