= Katiali =

- Town and sub-prefecture
- Location in Ivory Coast
- Coordinates: 9°49′N 5°56′W
- Country: Ivory Coast
- District: Savanes
- Region: Poro
- Department: M'Bengué

Population (2014)
  - Total: 8,861
- Time zone: UTC+0 (GMT)

Katiali is a town in the far north of Ivory Coast. It is a sub-prefecture of M'Bengué Department in Poro Region, Savanes District.

Katiali was a commune until March 2012, when it became one of 1,126 communes nationwide that were abolished.

In 2014, the population of the sub-prefecture of Katiali was 8,861. Katiali is situated within the Greenwich Mean Time (GMT) time zone.

== Villages ==
The five villages of the sub-prefecture of Katiali and their population in 2014 are:

1. Bodonon (624)
2. Katiali (7,092)
3. Kolokpo (426)
4. Komon (477)
5. Lougnouble (242)
