= Mare aux Hippopotames =

Lake and national park in Burkina Faso

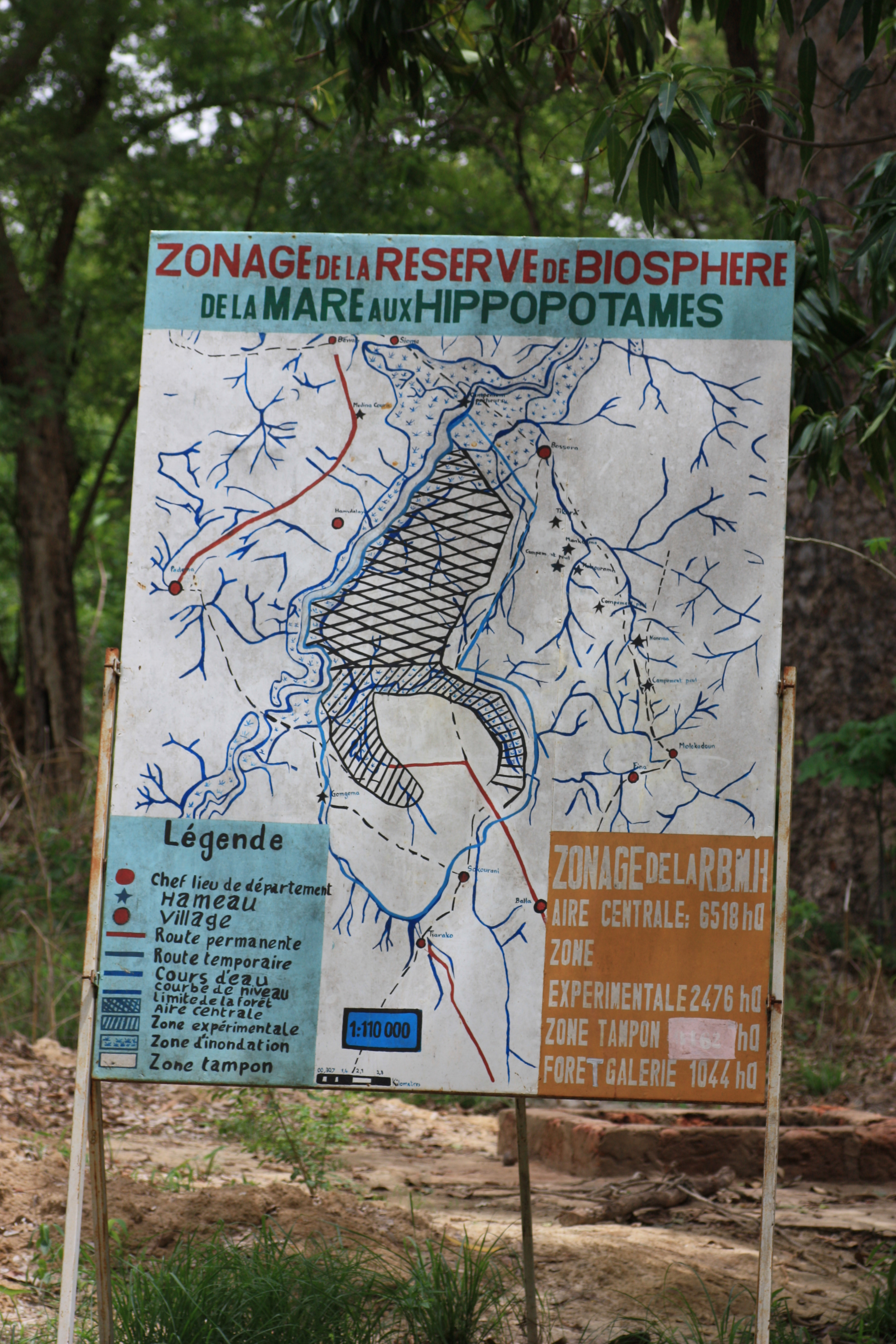
- Map at entrance
- Interactive map of Mare aux Hippopotames
- Location: Burkina Faso
- Nearest city: Bala
- Area: 163 km^{2} (63 sq mi)
- Established: 1937

Ramsar Wetland
- Designated: 27 June 1990
- Reference no.: 491

11°36′43″N 3°55′00″W

The Mare aux Hippopotames (Lake of Hippopotamuses) is a lake and national park in Burkina Faso, created in 1937 and designated in 1977 as the only UNESCO Biosphere Reserve in the nation. The park was created around a freshwater lake and includes surrounding pools and marches in the flood plain of the Black Volta River, and surrounding forests. The park is home to about 100 hippos; about 1000 eco-tourists visit each year. It is located about 60 kilometers (37 mi) north of Bobo-Dioulasso, and is itself about 163 square kilometres (63 sq mi) in size.

Mare aux Hippopotames is among the wetlands of international importance as defined by the Ramsar Convention.

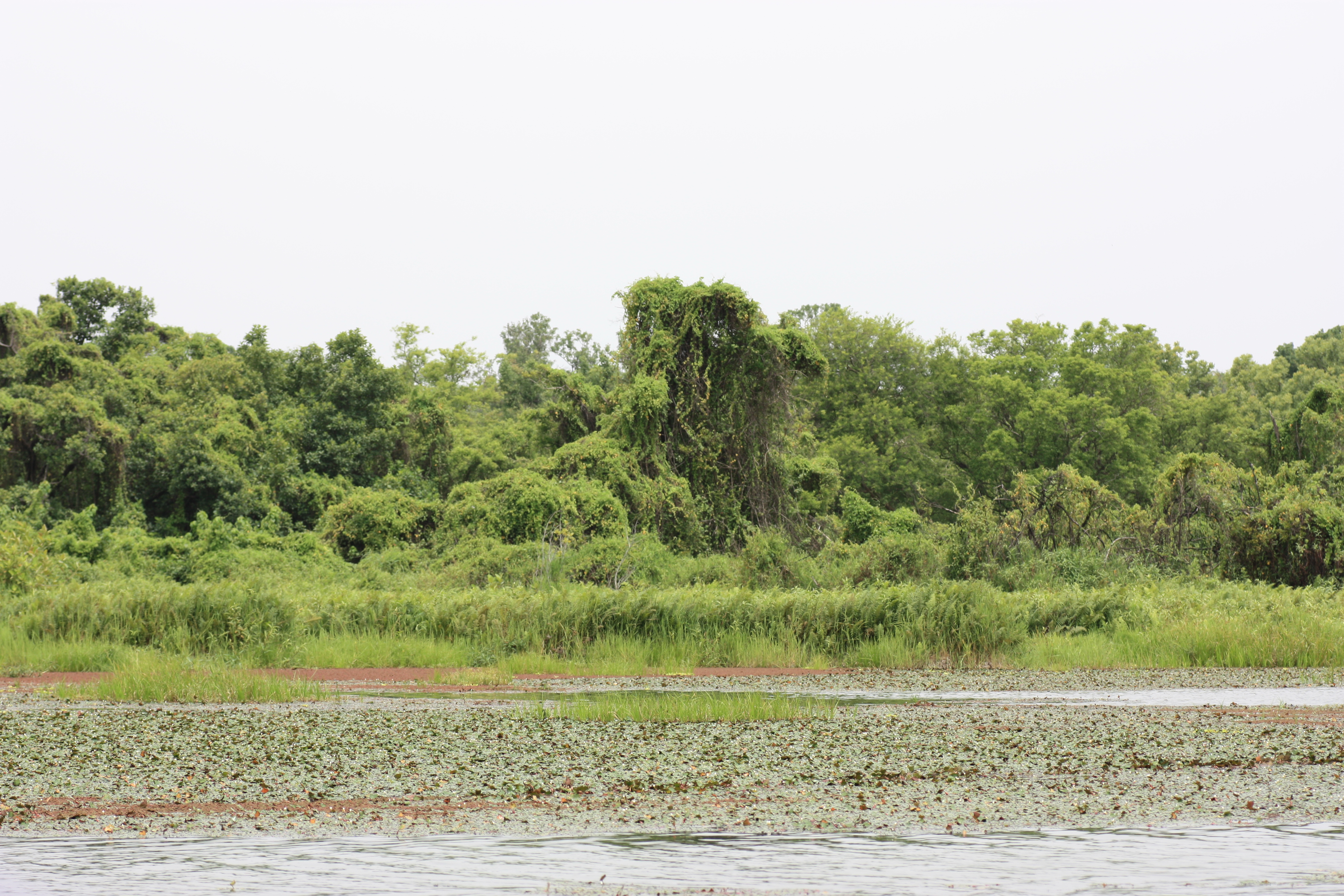
Mare aux Hippopotames
