= Fort Mangochi =

Coordinates: 14.3474°S 35.4835°E

- Malawi
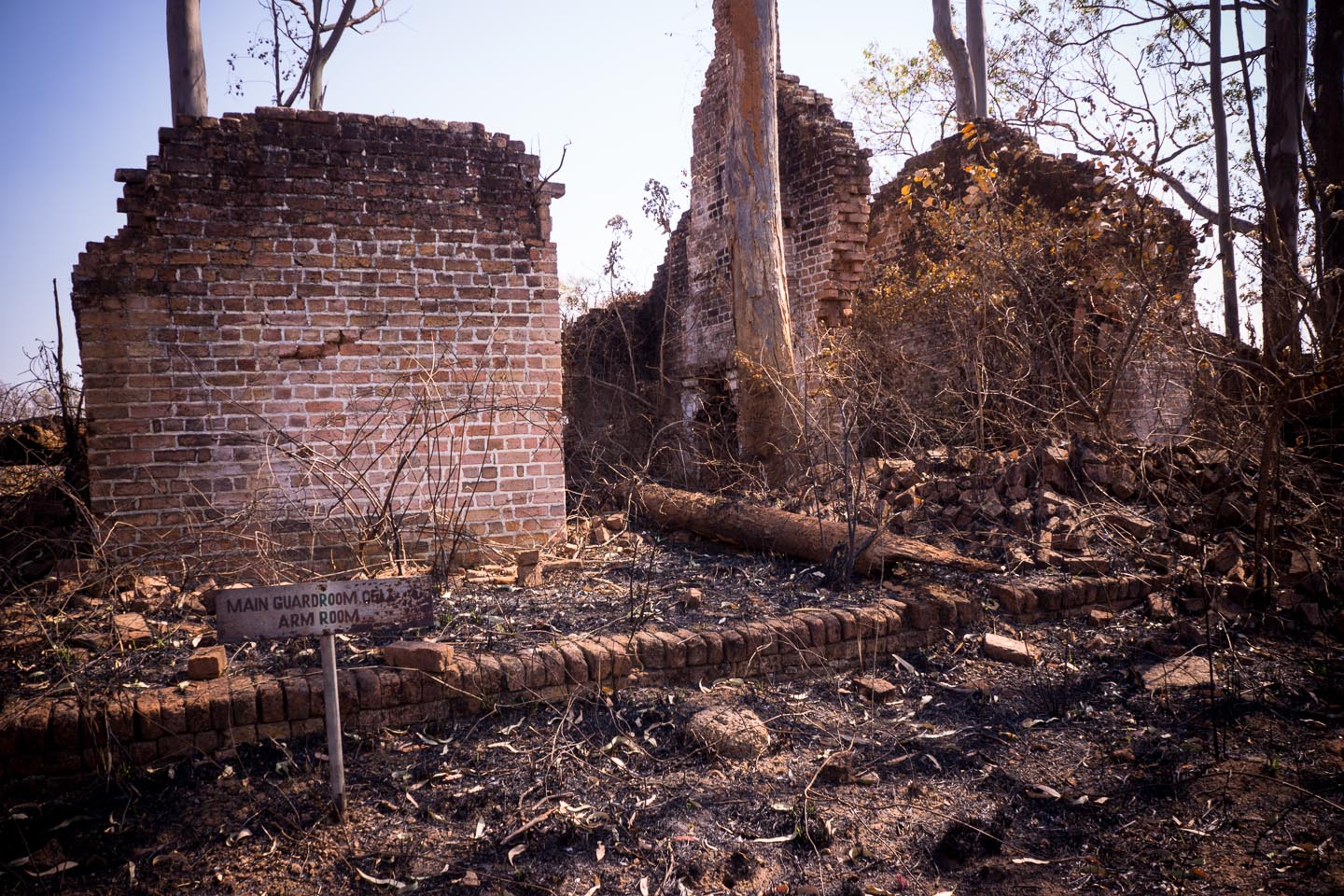
- Guardroom and armory inside Fort Mangochi

Site information
- Type: Fort
- Open to the public: Yes

Location
- Location in Malawi
- Location within Malawi

Fort Mangochi is a historical ruin located in the mountains nearby the small town of Namwera in Mangochi District, Malawi (formerly the British protectorate of Nyasaland). The ruins contain spacious walled-off rock walls, several feet thick and 2-3 meters tall, as well as a number of old buildings the last of which were constructed with fired brick and built around 1895. The fort was originally built by the Yao people led by Chief Mponda. The fort and the wider Makanjira Historical Corridor has been considered for World Heritage listing.

The high plateau surrounded by mountains was originally home to a famous Yao chief (presently known as Jalasi but formerly referred to as Zarafi). Along with other Yao chiefs Mponda and Makanjila, Jalasi resisted the British forces as he and other chiefs were involved in the lucrative slave trade. Jalasi fought off the British in 1891 but a stronger attack overwhelmed his people in 1895. Major Edwards was allegedly the first white man to step into the village, completely void of villagers on October 28, 1895, after the attack carried out by enlisted soldiers of Indian Sikh, Makua, Atonga and Yao men. An estimated 25,000 Yao called this place home, named after the Yao word for the type of tree that was common in the area and used as a local variety of rope for tying (magoji). Lieutenant E. G. Alston was commissioned with building a permanent fortress on the site.

The mountain varies between 4,500 and 4,200 feet above sea level and is located just below and to the north of the main peak of Mangochi mountain at 5,713 feet.

A number of buildings feature sign posts indicating what purpose each structure served including servants quarters, a flag post, Indian hospital, parade grounds, etc.

It is said that Chief Jalasi fled to Portuguese-ruled Mozambique and died there in 1906 but many of his subject returned to the area. The fort was used as a prison from 1907 to 1910 and as a training camp during World War I by the King's African Rifles.

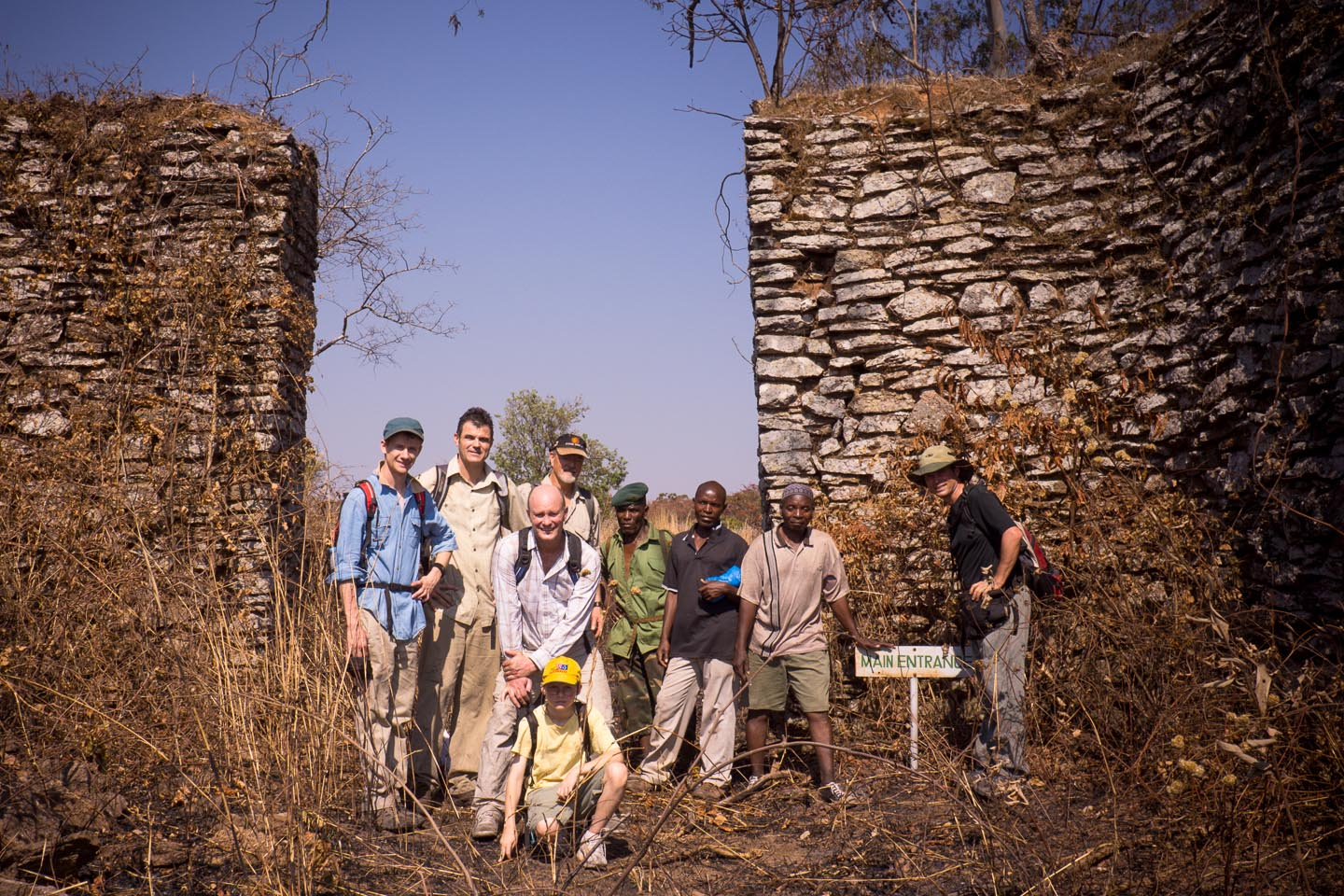
Main entrance to Fort Mangochi

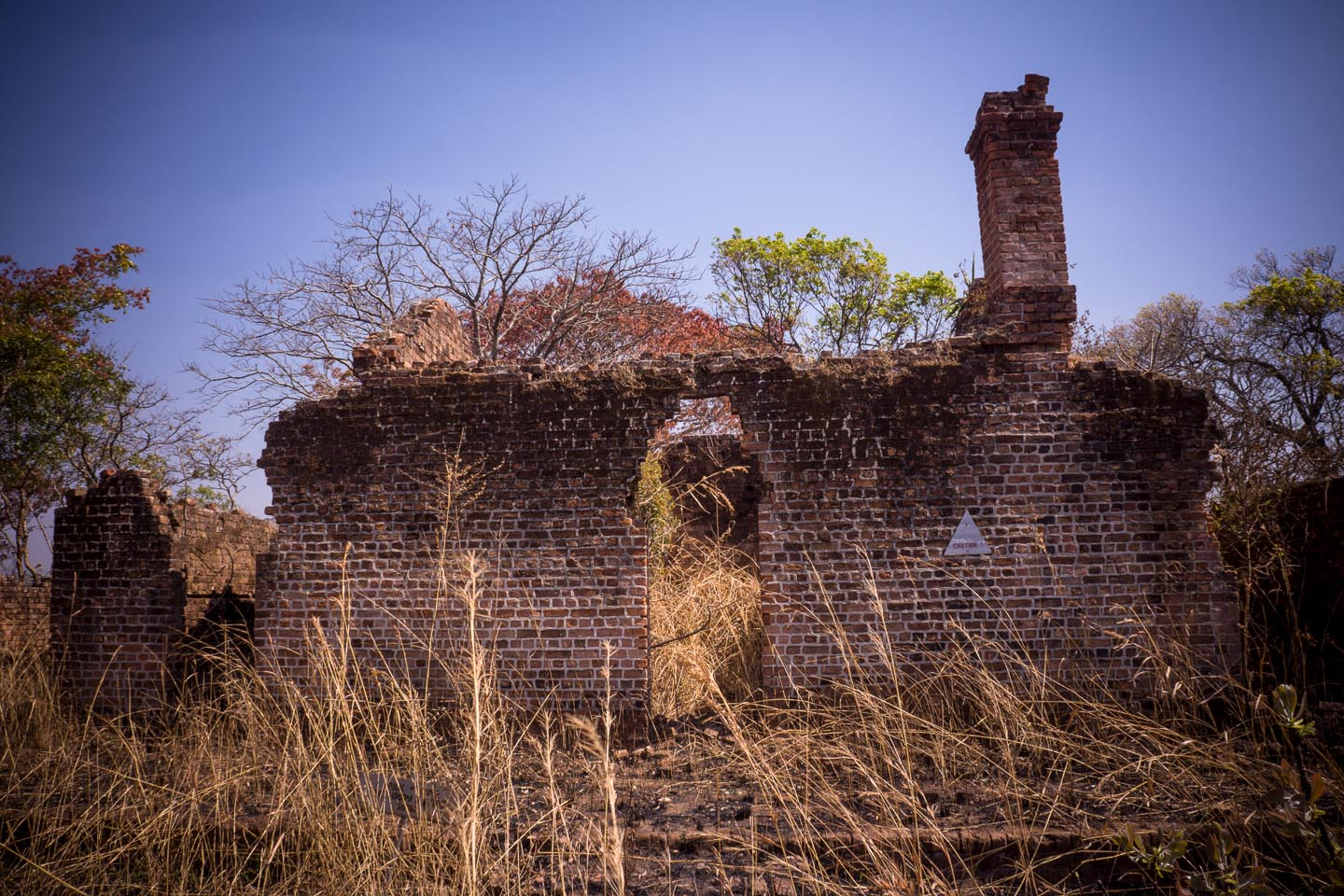
District Commissioner's quarters inside Fort Mangochi

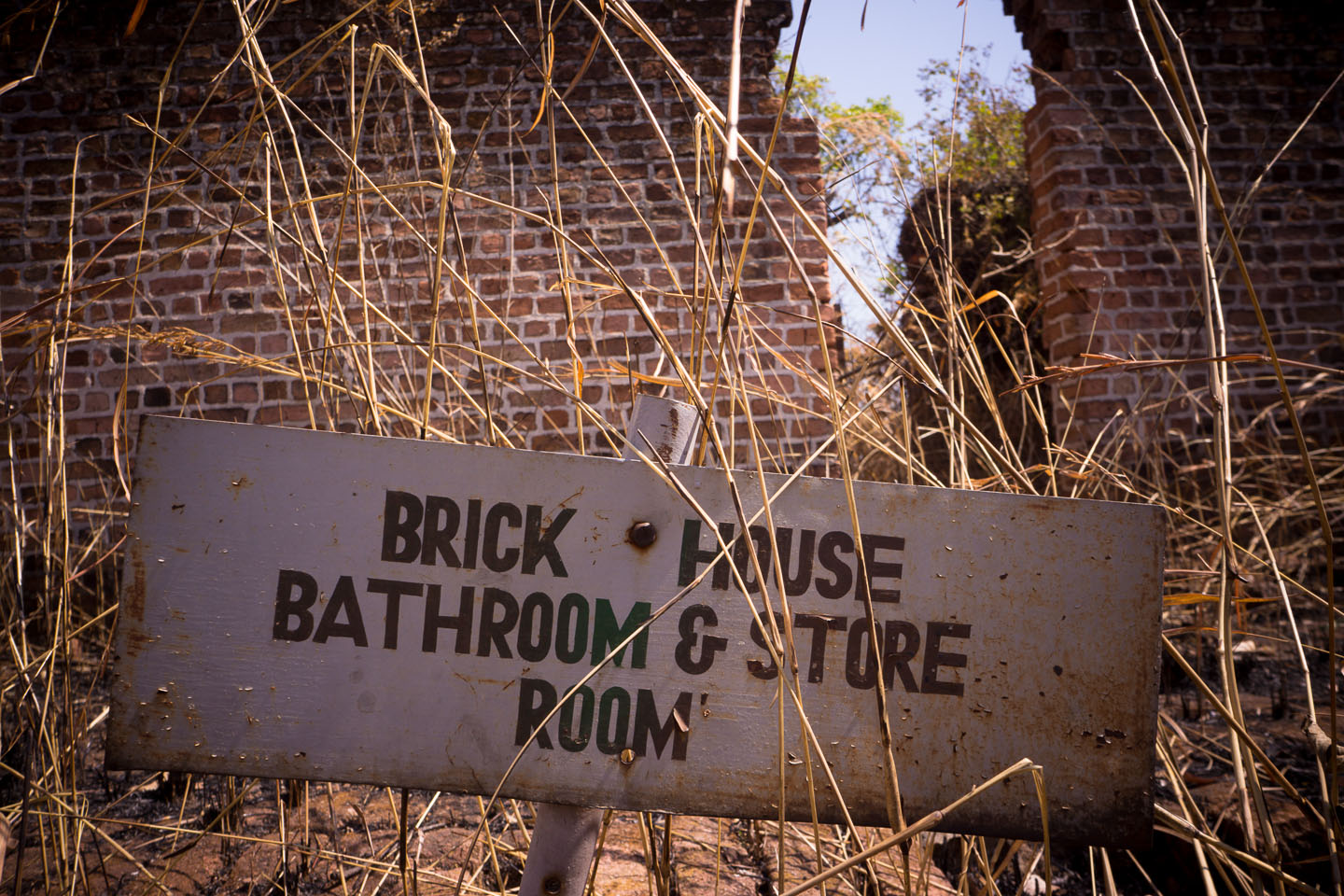
Brick House, Bathroom and Store Room

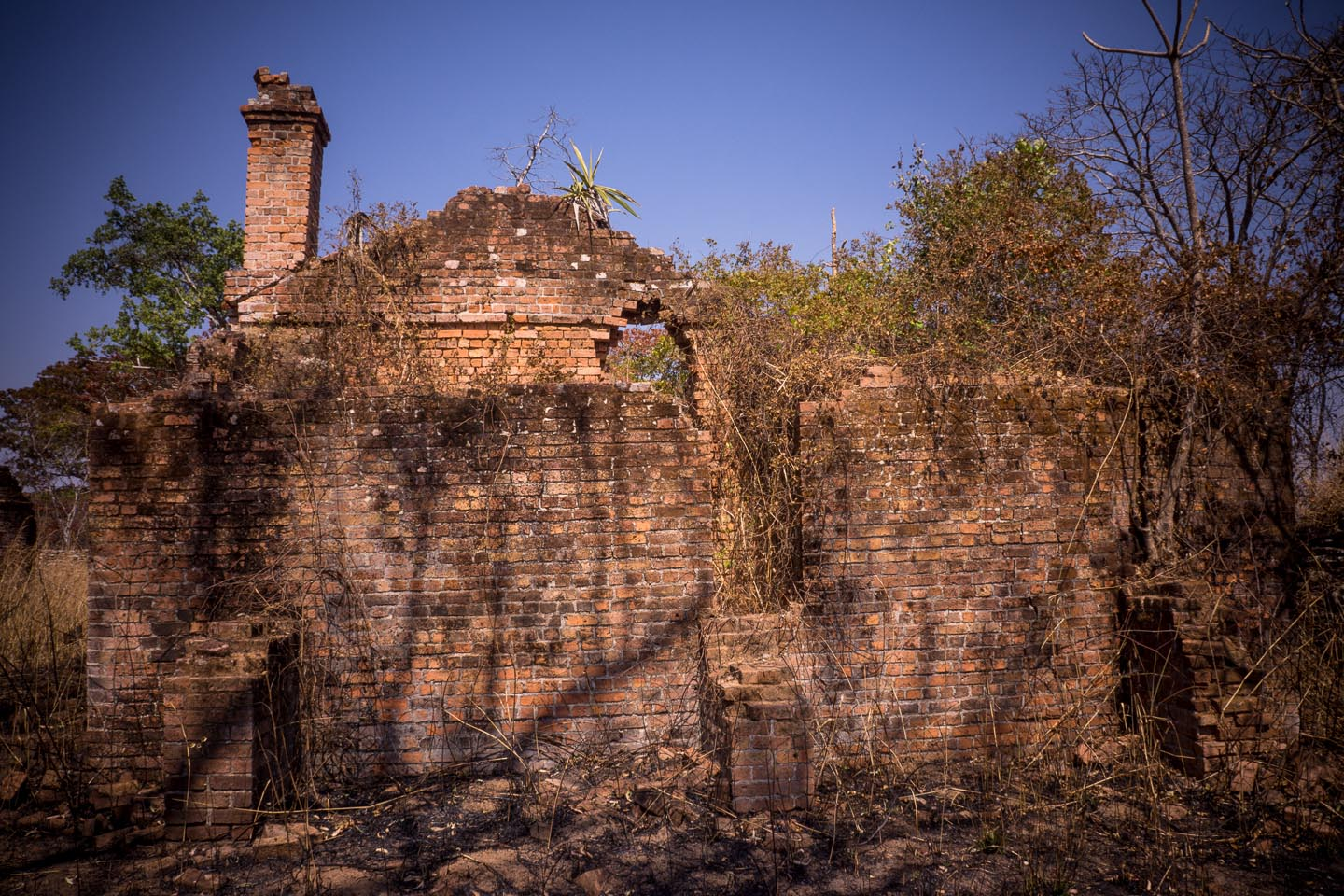
District commissioner's quarters

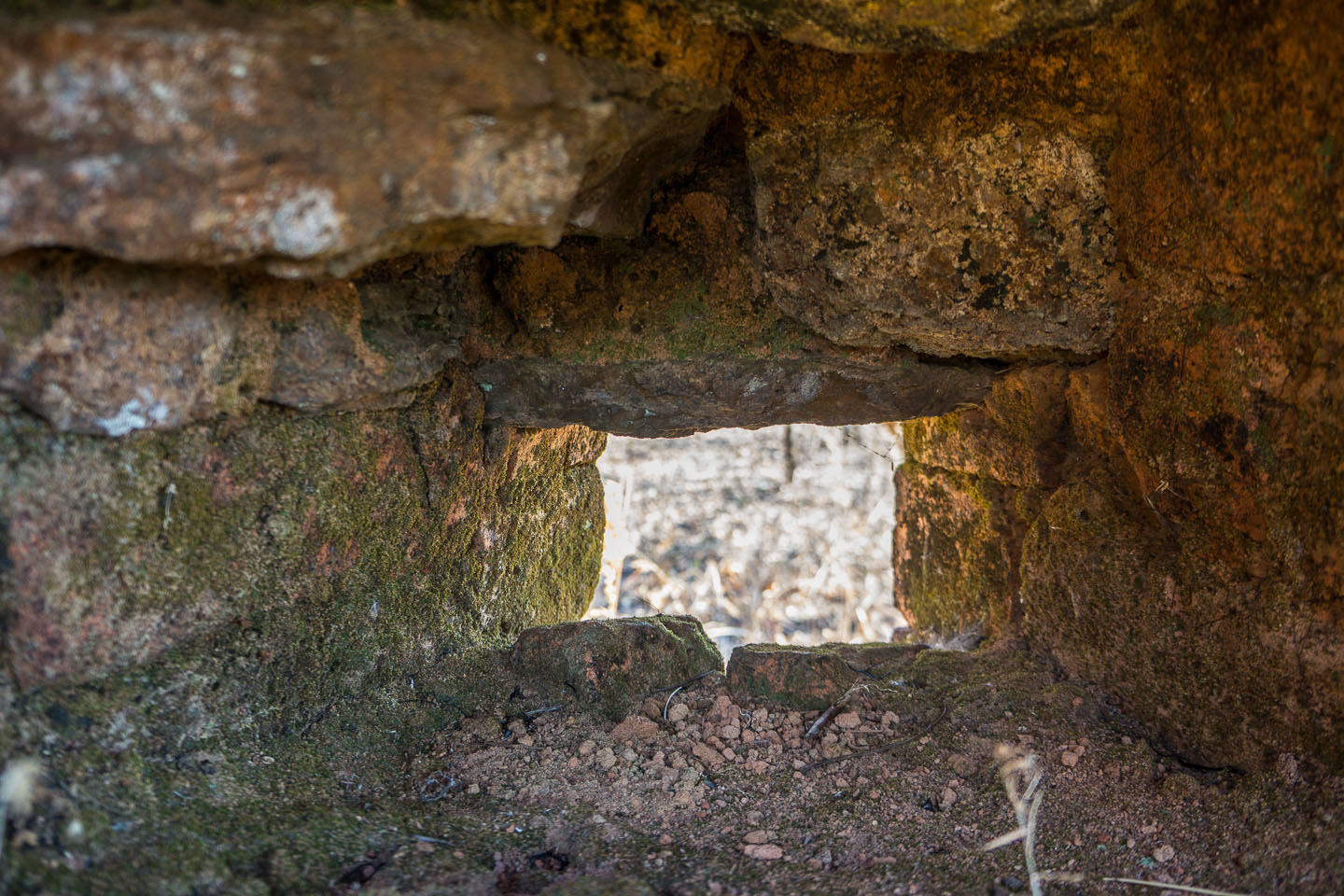
Fort Mangochi gun sight (close up)

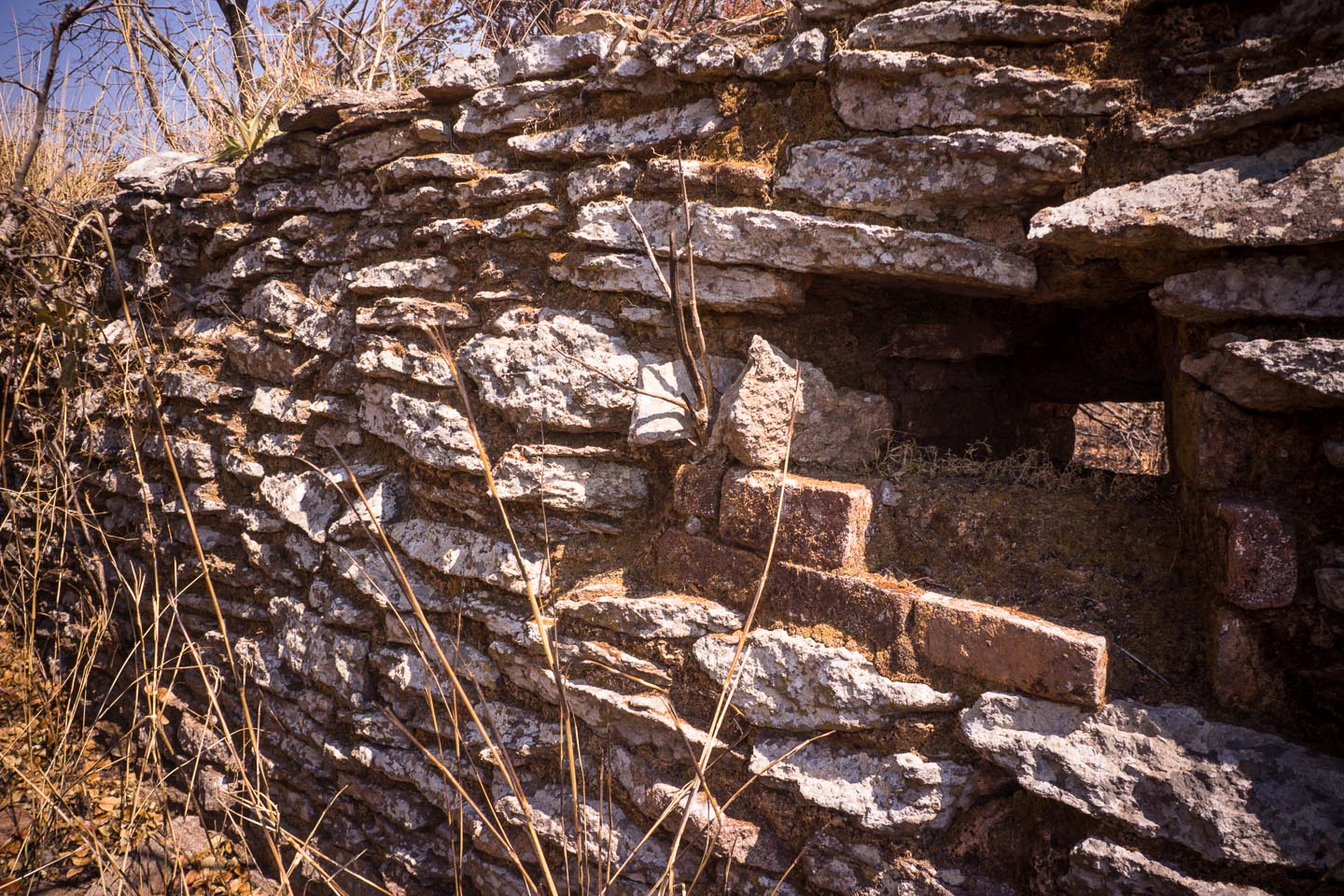
Fort Mangochi gun sight

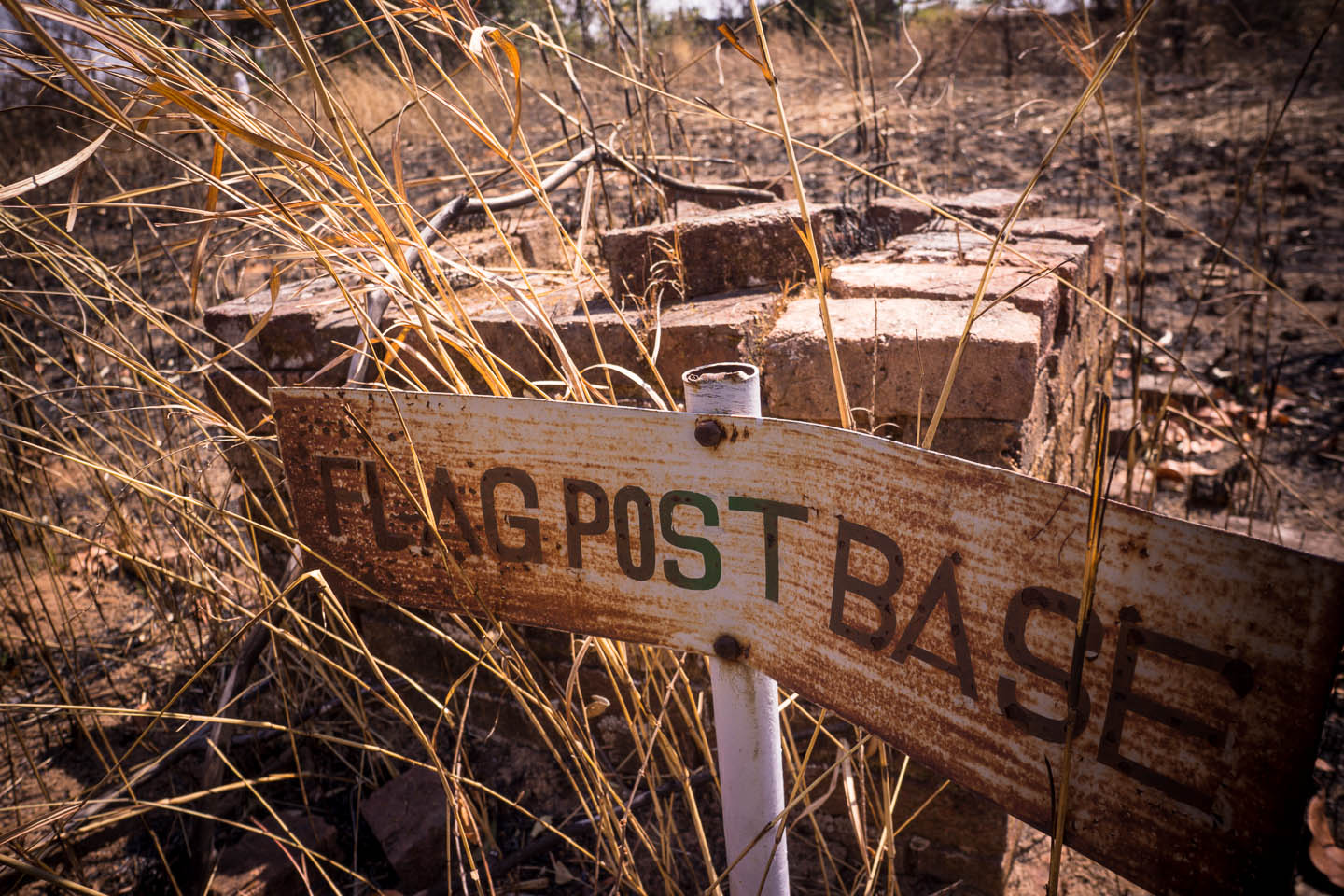
Flag post base

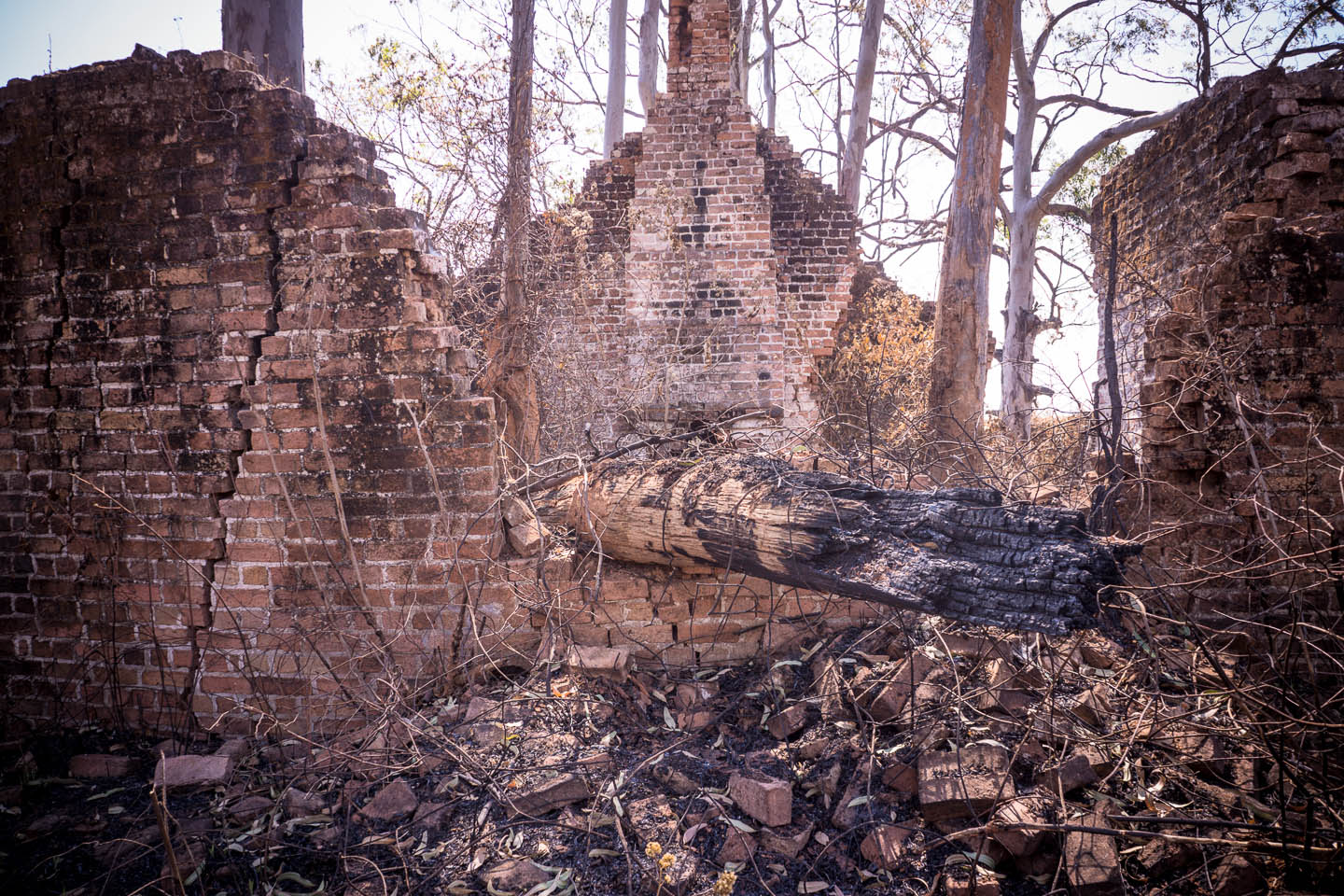
Alternate view of the guard room and armory

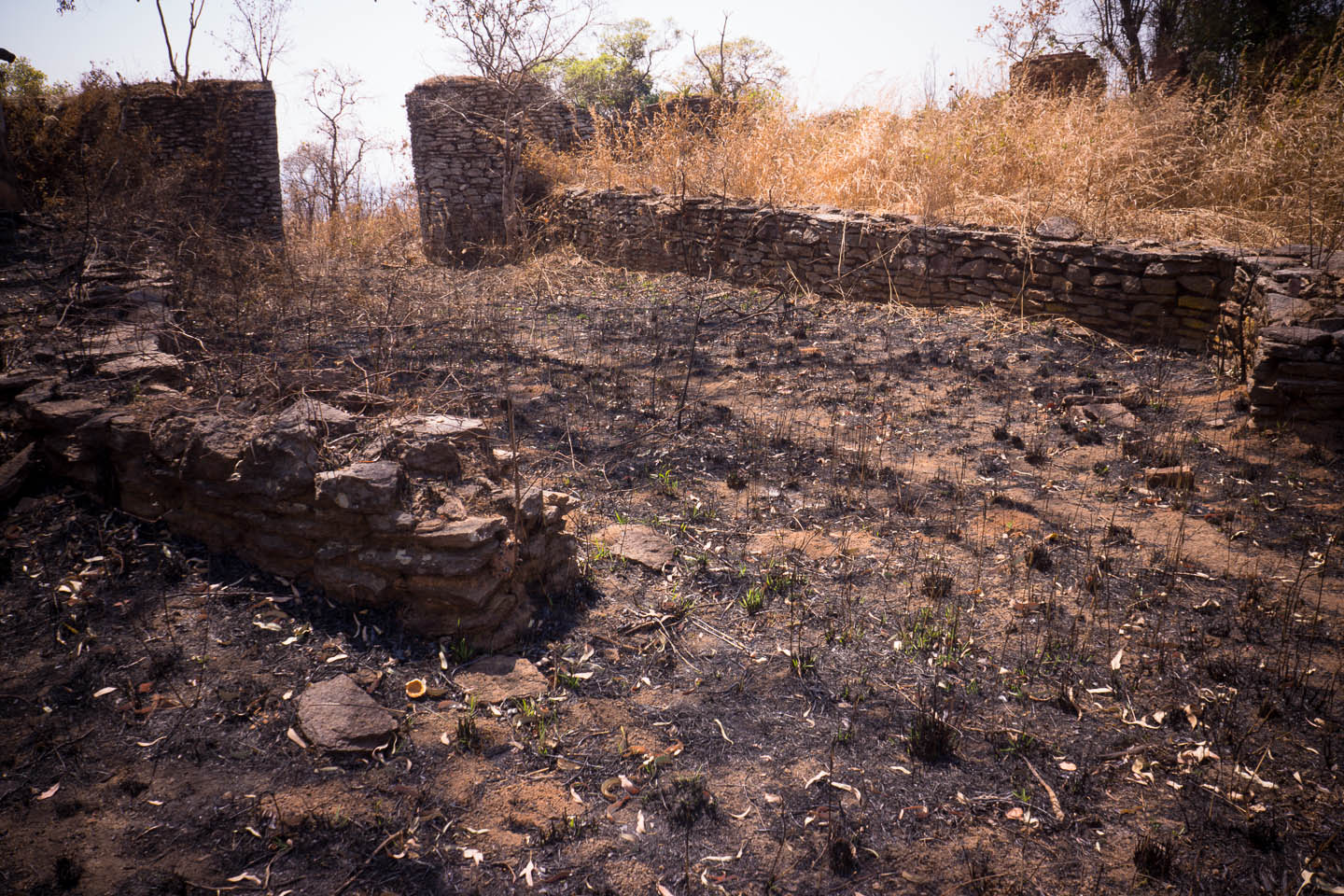
Fort Mangochi entrance/exit as seen from inside

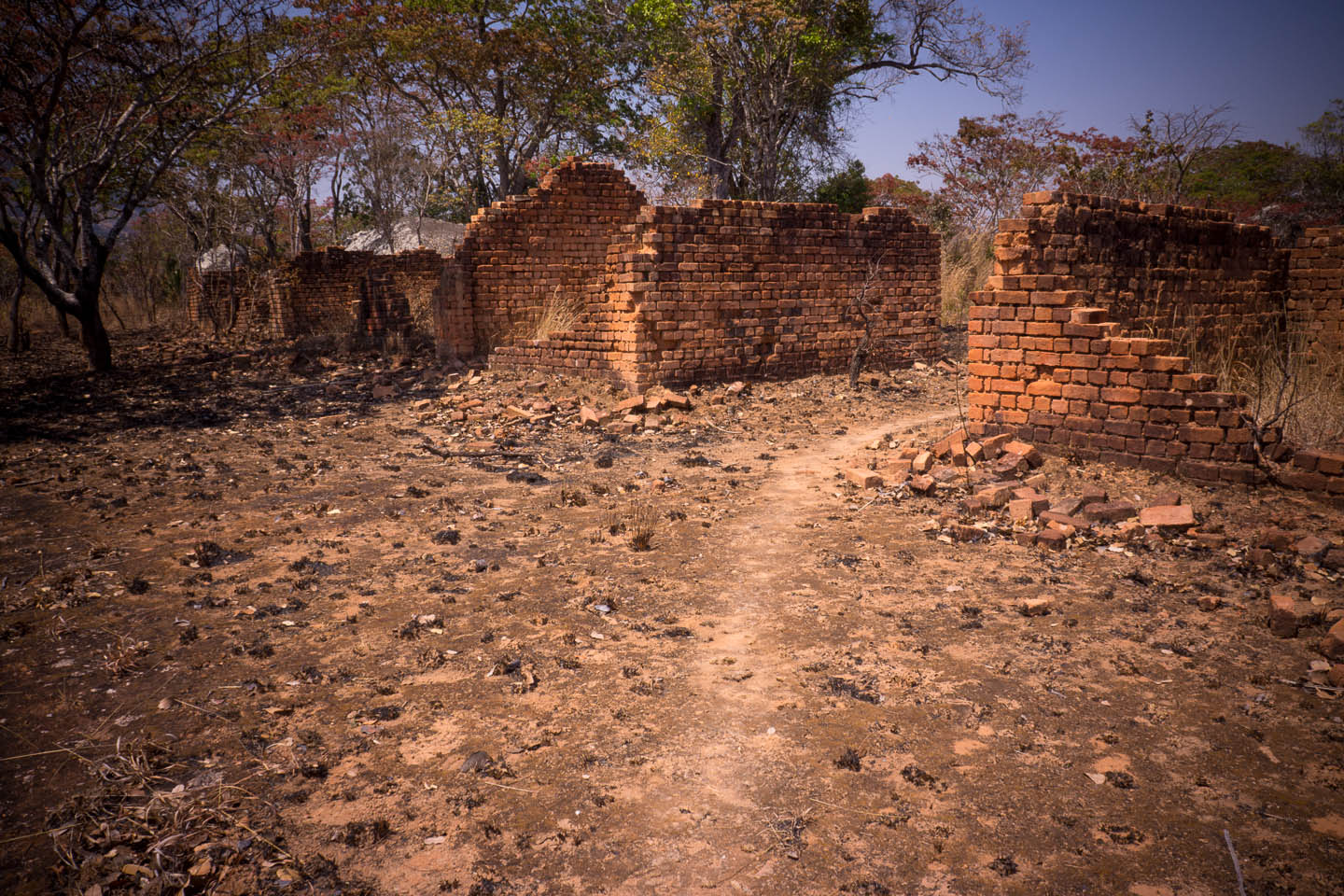
Towards the servants quarters outside the fort

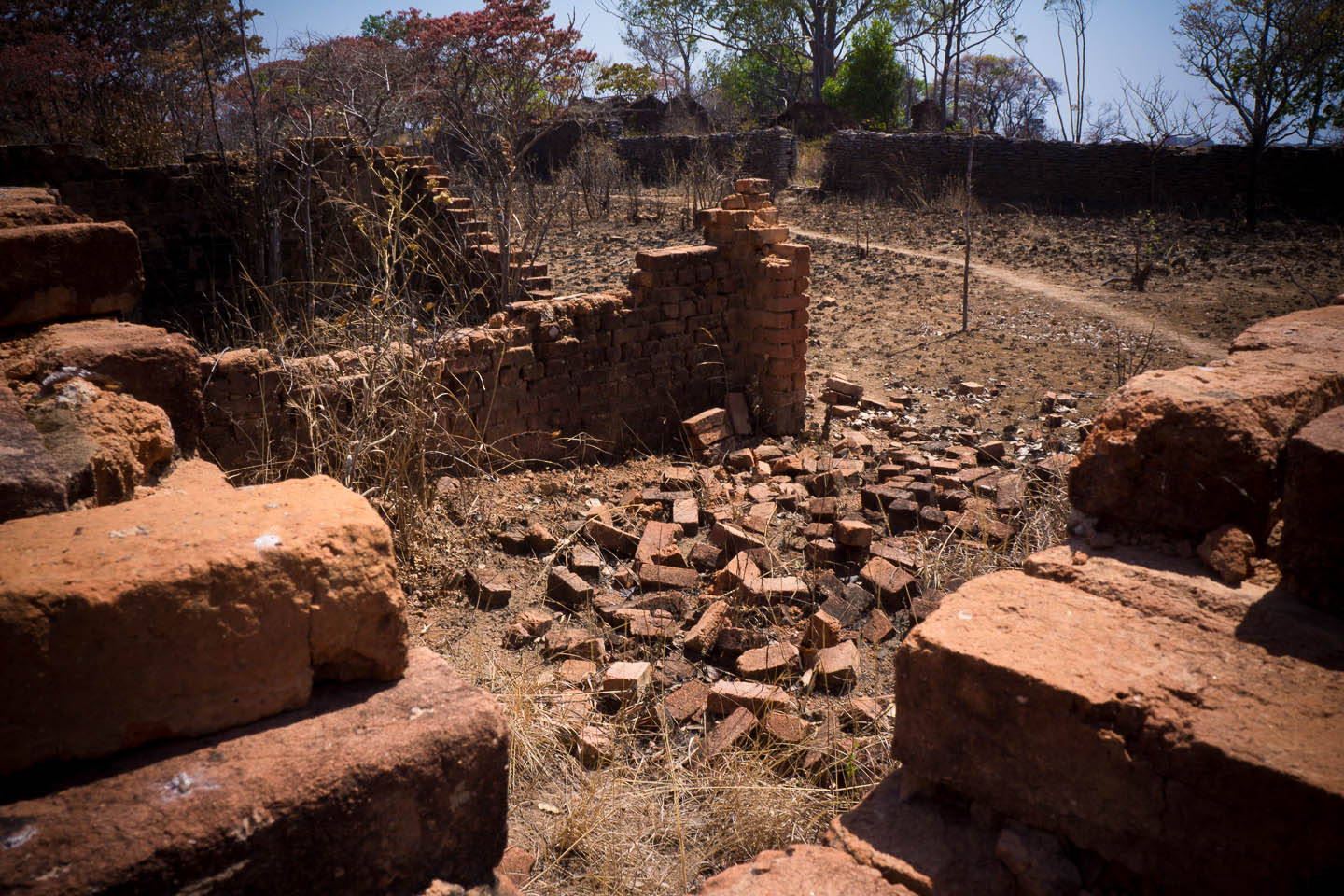
Servants quarters outside the fort

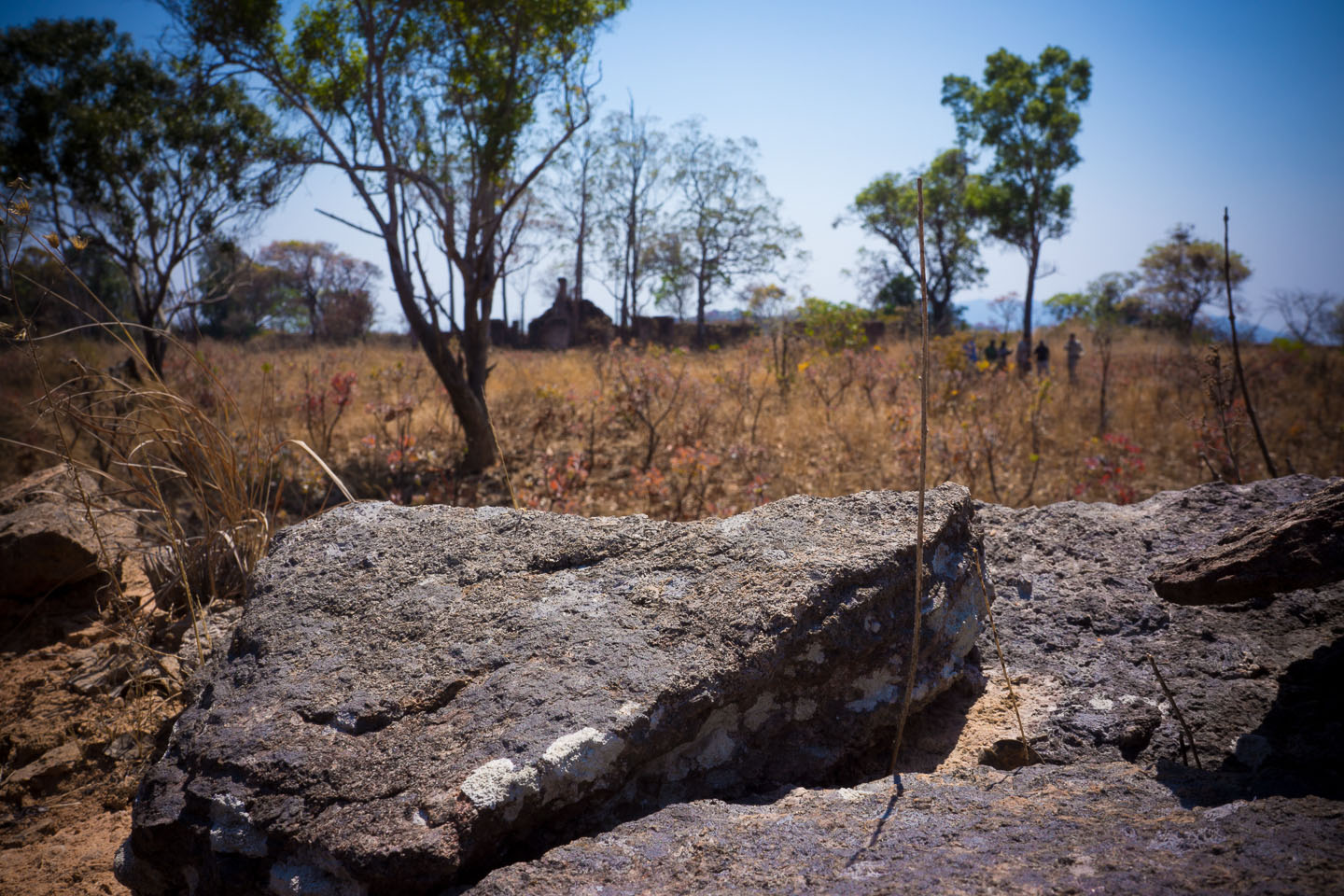
View inside the fort as it appears from near the Indian hospital

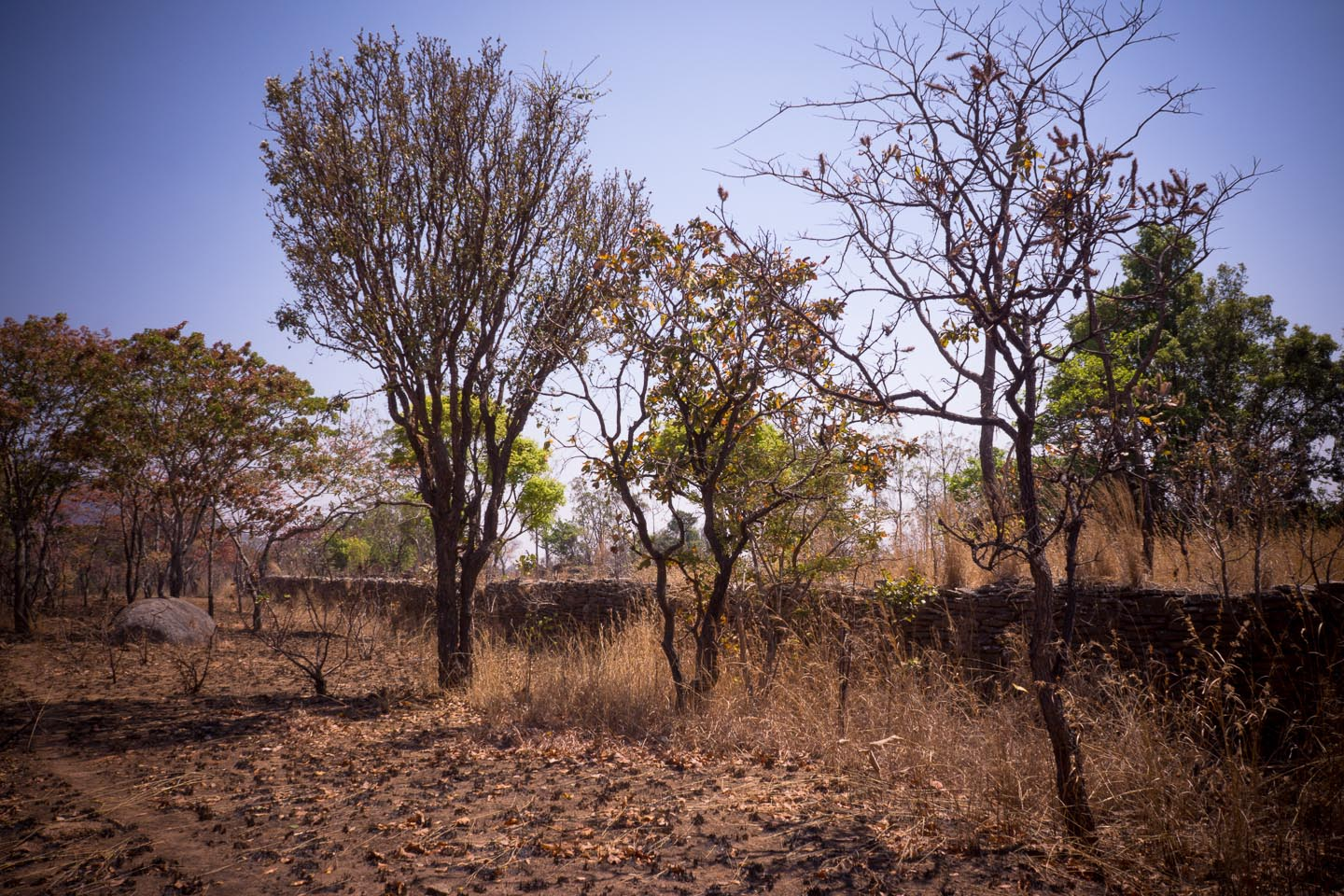
View of the wall at Fort Mangochi from the Indian hospital side

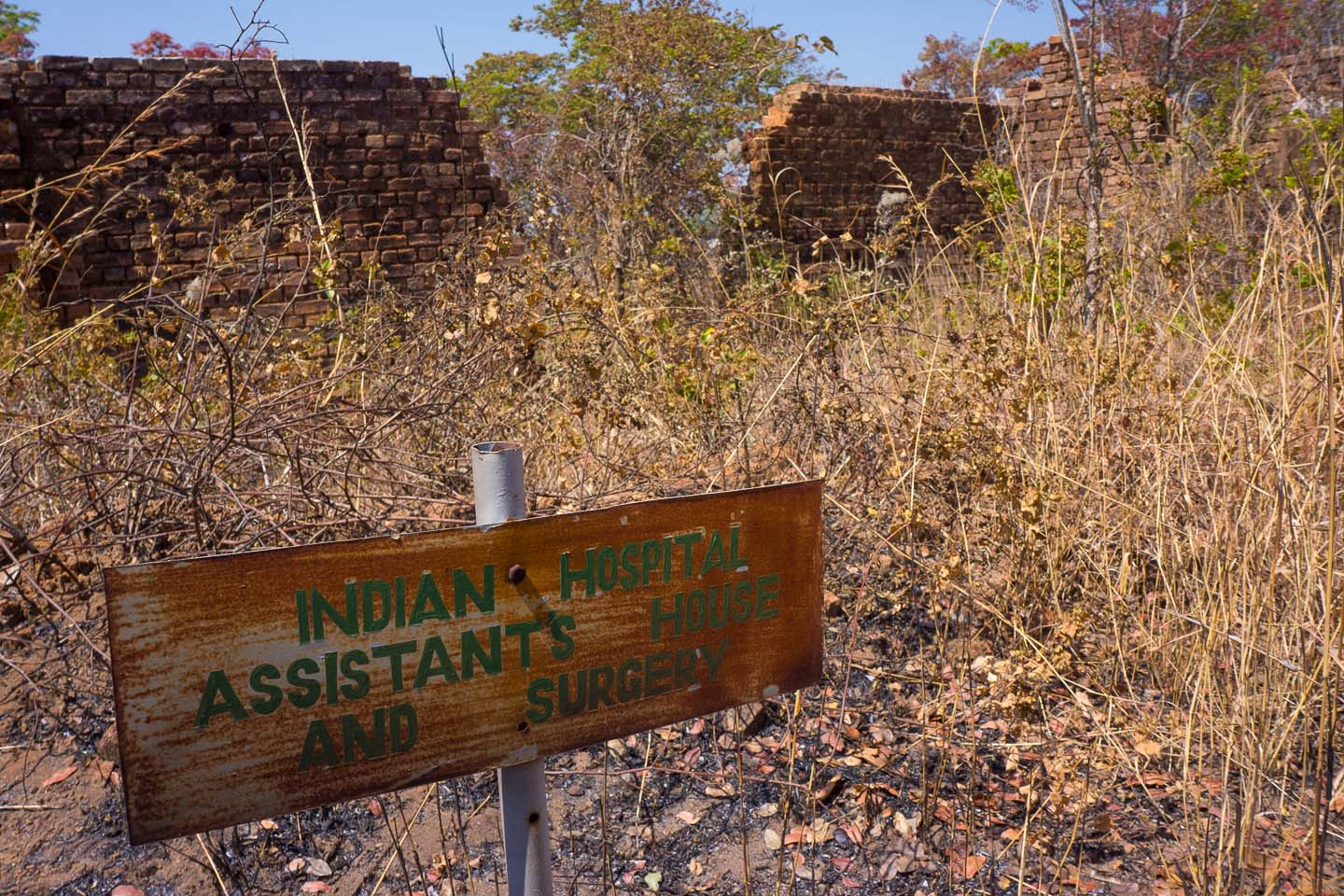
Indian hospital assistants house and surgery

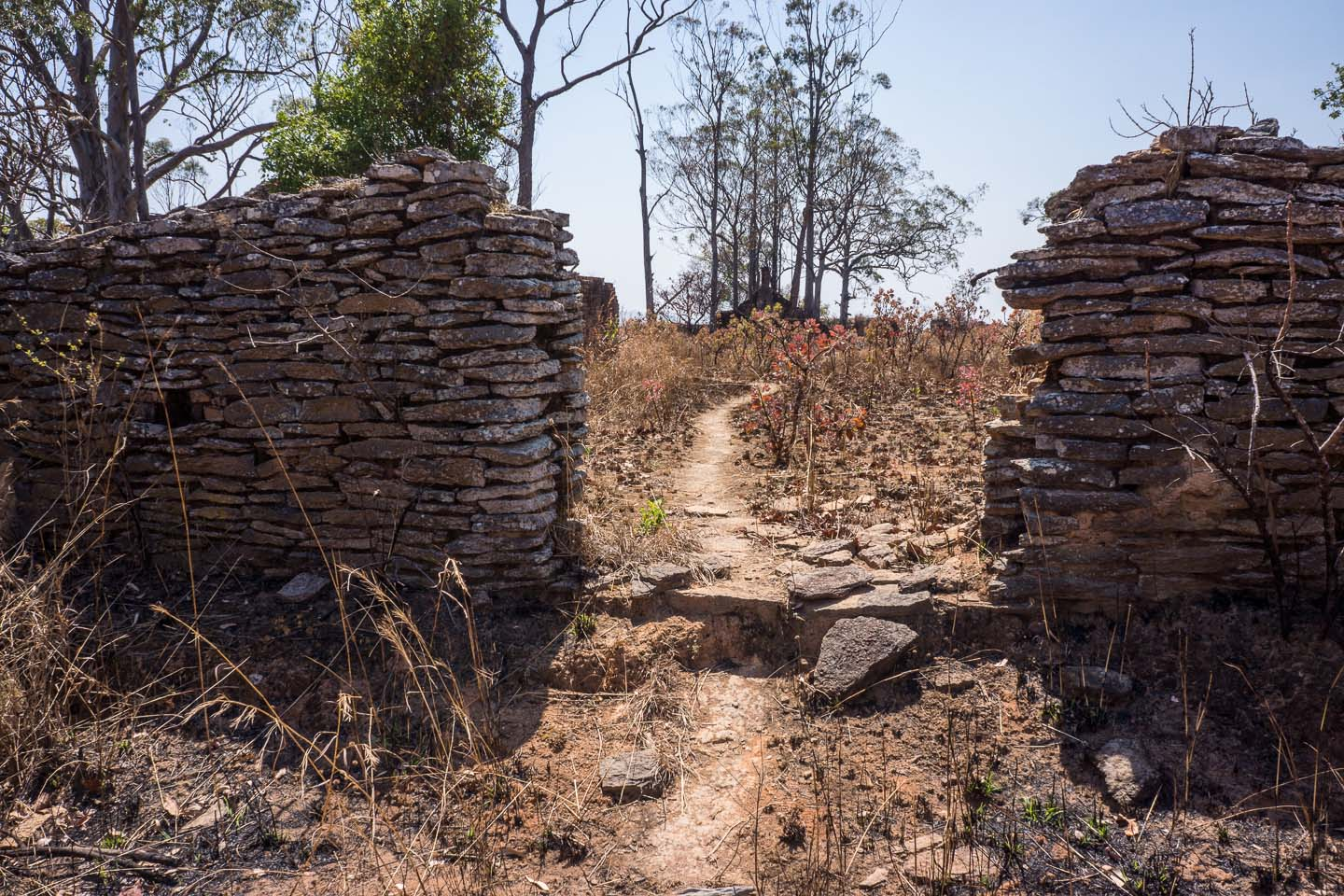
Other entrance/exit

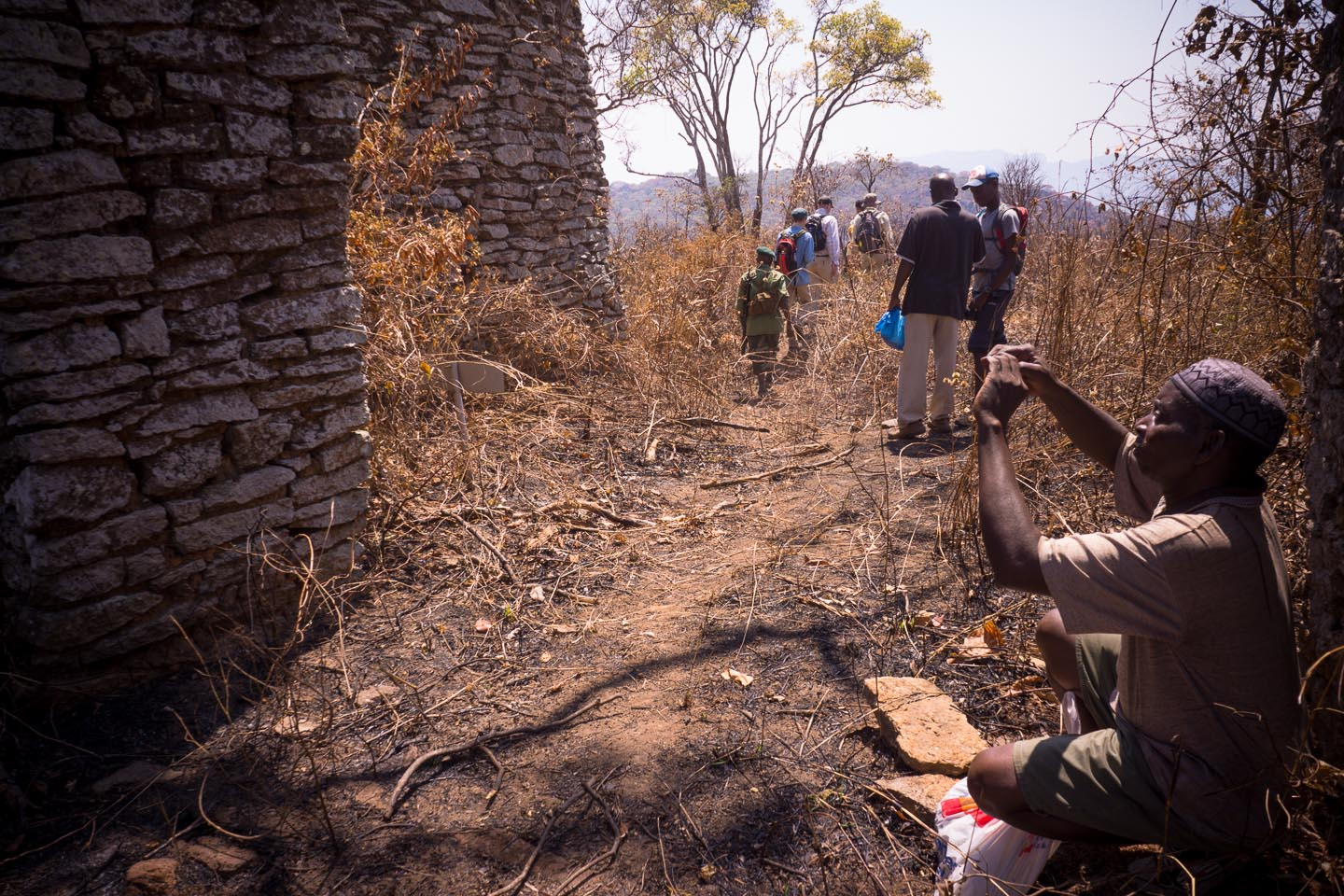
Leaving the fort, our Yao guide taking one last photo

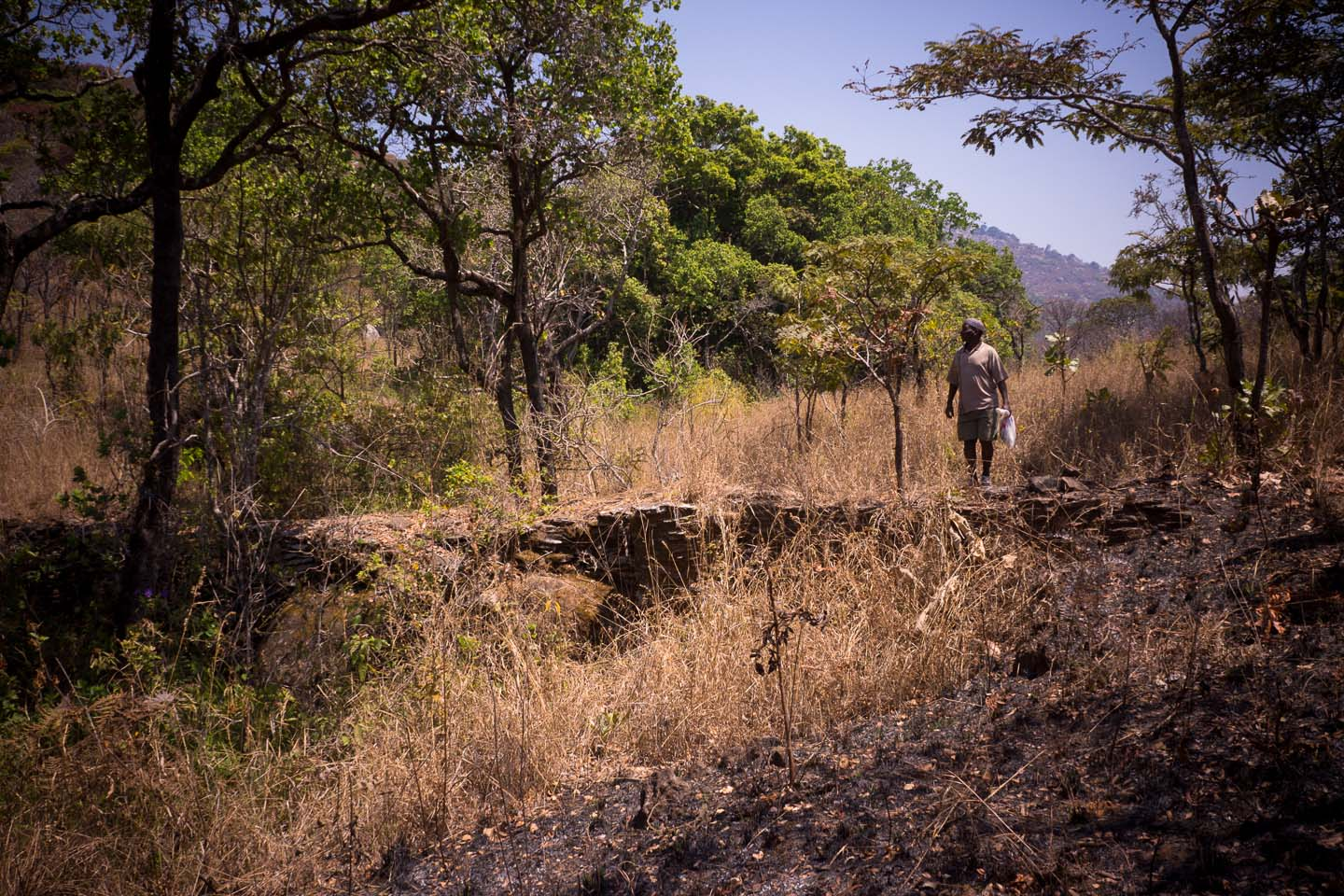
Dam outside of Fort Mangochi
