= M'Bengué =

- Town, sub-prefecture, and commune
- Location in Ivory Coast
- Coordinates: 10°0′N 5°54′W
- Country: Ivory Coast
- District: Savanes
- Region: Poro
- Department: M'Bengué

Area
  - Total: 1,590 km^{2} (610 sq mi)

Population (2021 census)
  - Total: 65,779
  - Density: 41.4/km^{2} (107/sq mi)
  - Town: 22,242
- (2014 census)
- Time zone: UTC+0 (GMT)

M'Bengué is a town in northern Ivory Coast. It is a sub-prefecture of and the seat of M'Bengué Department in Poro Region, Savanes District. M'Bengué is also a commune.

In 2021, the population of the sub-prefecture of M'Bengué was 65,779.

Within the sub-prefecture, the Mosque of Nambira, a small adobe mosque in the town, possibly built in the 18th and 19th centuries, was inscribed on the UNESCO World Heritage List in 2021 along with other mosques in the region for its outstanding representation of Sudano-Sahelian architecture.

== Villages ==
The 32 villages of the sub-prefecture of M'Bengué and their population in 2014 are:

1. Foundo 1 (584)
2. Foundo 2 (903)
3. M'bengue (22 242)
4. Sanhara (1 067)
5. Sindjougou (213)
6. Souhoua (1 187)
7. Boropekaha (187)
8. Bougounougo (502)
9. Kaloa (2 141)
10. Kanofa (234)
11. Kanofa 1 (200)
12. Kanonon (762)
13. Kassalgue (816)
14. Katala 1 (442)
15. Katala 2 (285)
16. Legoun (369)
17. Masseguere (1 406)
18. Nafoun (1 304)
19. Nambira (1 017)
20. N'diengbala (709)
21. Poungbe (1 830)
22. Sandregue (1 533)
23. Sekonkaha (869)
24. Soleya (898)
25. Tiebila (965)
26. Tietougou (654)
27. Tiolo 1 (486)
28. Tiolo 2 (464)
29. Tongon (3 929)
30. Vononloho (519)
31. Zangbanou (353)
32. Zeguere (858)
