= Palabek Kal =

Town council in Lamwo District, Northern Region, Uganda

- Town council
- Location within Uganda
- Coordinates: 3°26′09″N 32°34′58″E
- Country: Uganda
- Region: Northern Region
- Sub-region: Acholi sub-region
- District: Lamwo District
- County: Palabek County

Population (2024 census)
  - Total: 7,811
  - Male: 3,777
  - Female: 4,034
- Time zone: UTC+3 (EAT)

Palabek Kal is a town council in Palabek County, Lamwo District, in northern Uganda.

== Location ==
Palabek Kal lies in Lamwo District, the northernmost district in the Acholi sub-region of Uganda. Palabek Kal sits north-west of Kitgum, and north of Kampala (by road distance).

== Administration ==
Palabek Kal Town Council became a new administrative unit in financial year 2020/ 2021, with start-up funding intended for operational set-up and office needs.

== Demographics ==
In the 2024 national census, Palabek Kal Town Council recorded 7,811 people (3,777 male and 4,034 female). The same source reports 3,118 people aged 0–14, 4,390 aged 15–64, and 303 aged 65+.

Palabek-Kal Sub-county recorded 9,961 people and 2,354 households in the 2024 census.

== Health ==
Palabek Kal Health Centre IV, located in Palabek Town Council, transitioned from Health Centre III to Health Centre IV in July 2024, with commissioning reported in October 2024.

UNFPA reported investment of over US$100,000 to equip the operating theatre and support emergency obstetric and newborn care services, with an estimated service catchment of about 140,000 residents of Palabek County and nearby refugee communities.

A Daily Monitor report described staffing constraints at Palabek-kal Health Centre IV, citing 16 health workers serving a population of about 200,000 people (refugees and host community).

== Refugee settlement ==
Palabek Refugee Settlement was established in April 2017 in Lamwo District. A UNHCR data portal factsheet (June 2018, published November 2018) reported almost 38,000 South Sudanese refugees in the settlement at the time, and noted ongoing infrastructure development.

By October 2024, Daily Monitor reported Lamwo District hosting 84,723 South Sudanese refugees, with referrals linked to Palabek Refugee Settlement and nearby facilities. UNFPA reported refugee population in Palabek settlement exceeding 84,000 people in 2024.

Lamwo District local government planning documents described refugee settlement locations in Palabek Ogili, Palabek Kal, and Palabek Gem sub-counties, and noted pressure on education and other services in host sub-counties (data cited as of September 2019).

== Education ==
Lamwo District Development Plan III lists schools linked to Palabek Kal in district education mapping, including Palabek Kal Primary School and Palabek kal Community Secondary School, alongside other schools in Palabek Kal Sub-county and refugee settlement schools in Palabek Refugee Settlement.

== See also ==
- Lamwo District
- Acholi sub-region
- Palabek Refugee Settlement
