= Oldonyo Murwak hill =

Cultural heritage site in Kilimanjaro Region

Oldonyo Murwak is a site where the Maasai tribes of Kenya and Tanzania perform coming of age ceremonies. The hill, located in Hai District, Tanzania, in the Sanya Plains, has been put forward for consideration to listed as a World Heritage site of "outstanding universal value"

== World Heritage Status ==
This site was added to the UNESCO World Heritage Tentative List on May 27, 1997 in the Cultural category.
