= The Classified Forest, the Madarounfa Lake and the Tombs of the 99 saints =

The Classified Forest, the Madarounfa Lake and the Tombs of the 99 saints are located in the Madarounfa Department, Maradi Region, of Niger.

== Site description ==
The site consists of three primary features:

1. The Madarounfa Fores – Beginning 1 km north of the lake, it covers an area of 830 hectares and forms a unique landscape of trees and flowers.
2. The Madarounfa Lake – Covers 800 hectares and creates a home for many species of birds.
3. The Tombs of 99 Saints – Surround the lake and are the site of ritual by local people.

== World Heritage Status ==
This site was added to the UNESCO World Heritage Tentative List on May 26, 2006 in the Mixed (Cultural + Natural) category.
