= Gadabedji Reserve =

Nature reserve in Niger

Réserve total de faune & fôret classée du Gadabedji
- IUCN category IV (habitat/species management area)
- Interactive map of Réserve total de faune & fôret classée du Gadabedji
- Location: Maradi Region, Niger
- Nearest city: Dakoro, Bader, Niger
- Coordinates: 12°35′59″N 2°36′00″E
- Area: 76,000 ha (190,000 acres)
- Established: 1 January 1955
- Governing body: Parcs Nationaux & Reserves - Niger

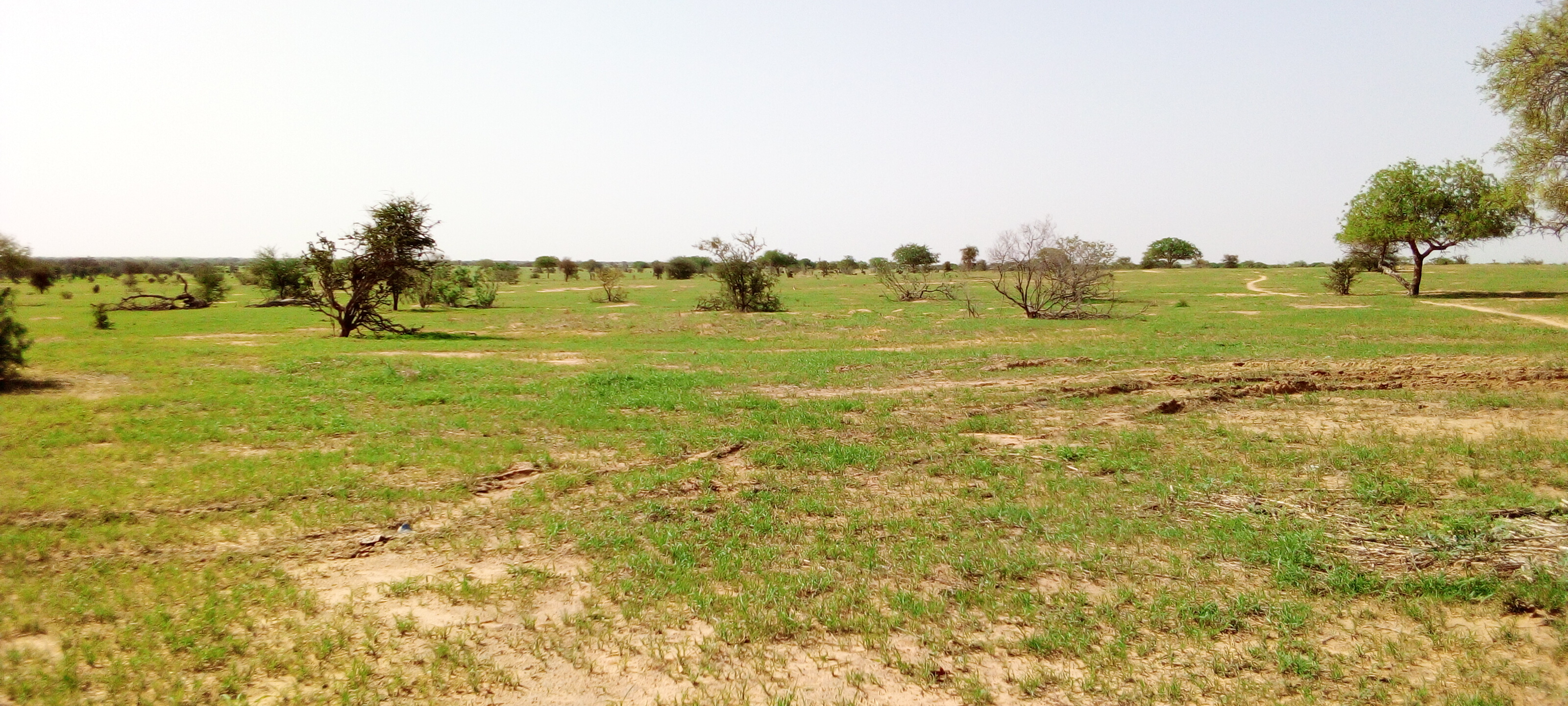
Gadabeji Reserve in 2023

The Gadabedji Total Reserve (Réserve totale de Faune du Gadabedji) is a nature reserve in the central region of Niger. It is a Total Faunal Reserve IUCN type IV, covering some 76,000 hectares within the northern tip of the Maradi Region, just north of the town of Dakoro, and south of the border with the Agadez Region. The reserve is also recognized biosphere reserve by the Unesco since 2017.

== Geography ==
The reserve, originally established 25 April 1955, by Law No. 3120/S.E. is also a 'fôret classée'. It covers a small area of Sahelian wooded steppe and grassland, south of the Aïr Mountains.

== Animal population ==
Gadabedji Total Reserve was planned to protect Sahelo-Saharan antelopes, mainly the Scimitar-horned oryx and Dama gazelle populations which have largely disappeared due to local population pressures. In the 1940s, the area was along an important migration route for the animals from the Tenere desert to the Adar in the south of the country. It remains a transhumance route for domesticated cattle and camels, as well as some wild Dorcas and Ménas Gazelles. The reserve is a proposed site of future Oryx reintroduction.
