= Sudanese style mosques in northern Côte d'Ivoire =

Group of World Heritage-listed mosques on the Ivory Coast

Sudanese style mosques in northern Côte d’Ivoire
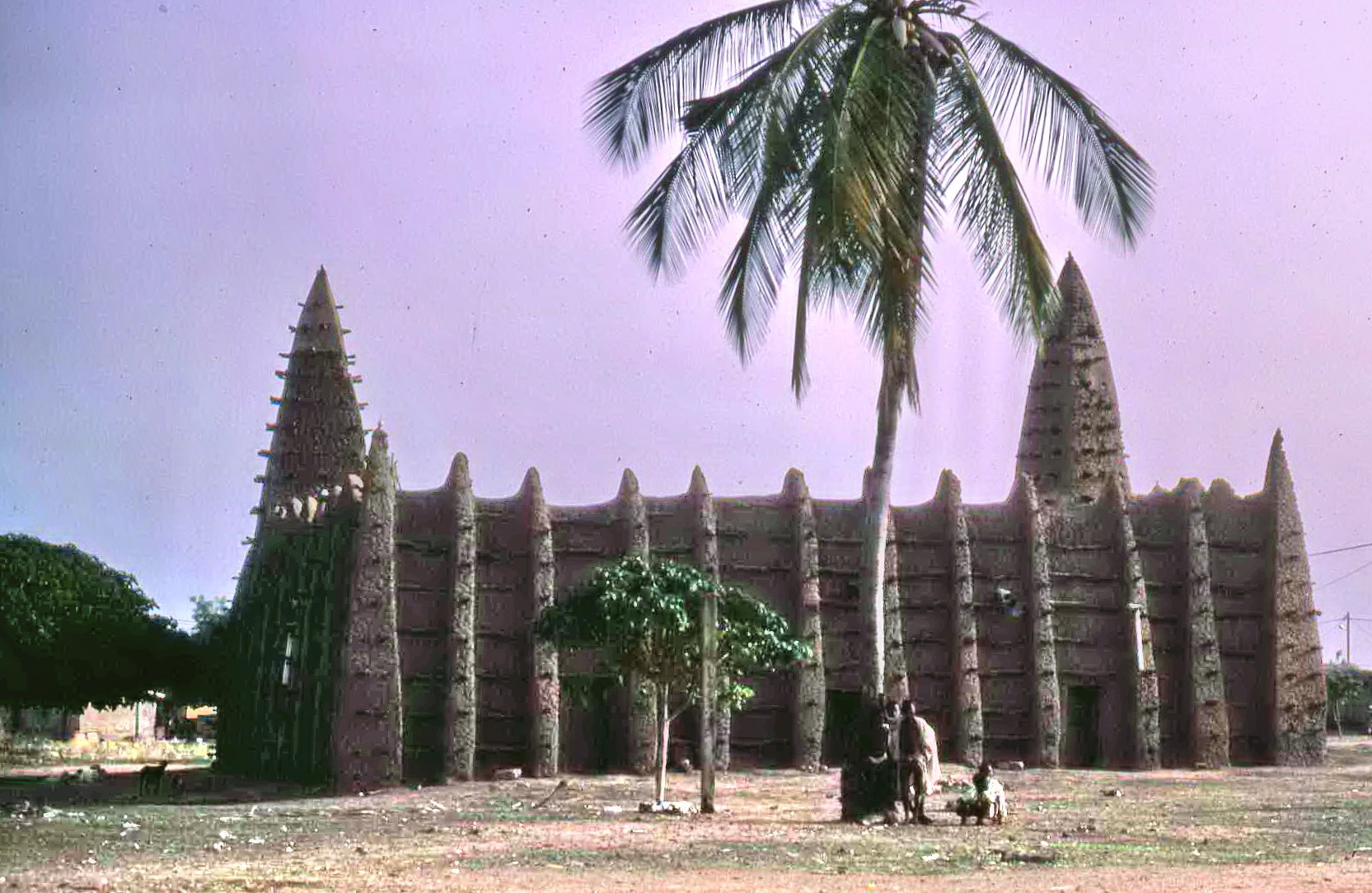

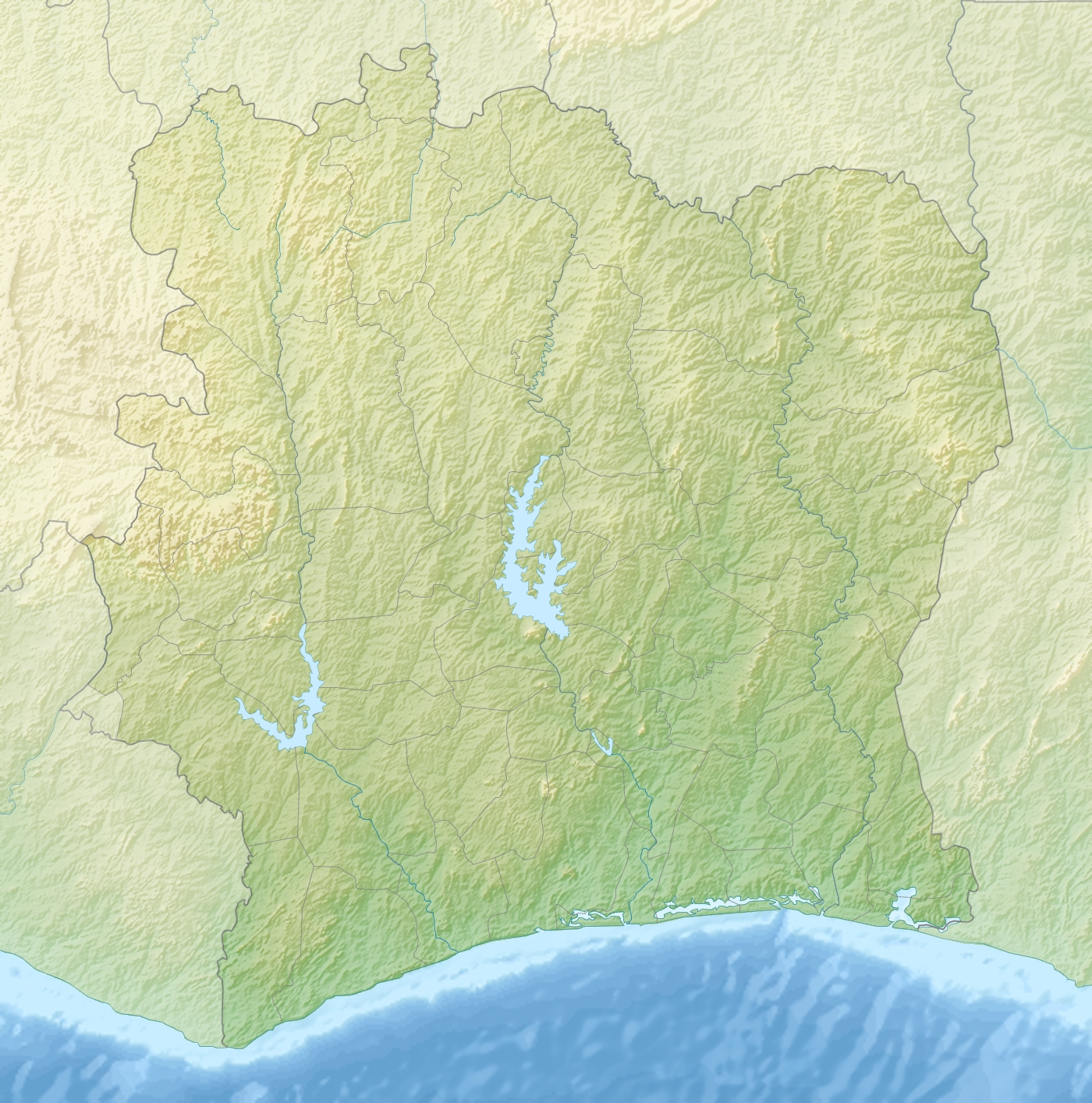
- Location of the mosque in Tengréla on the Côte d'Ivoire

Religion
- Affiliation: Islam
- Ecclesiastical or organizational status: Mosques

Location
- Location: Northern region: Ouangolodougou; Tengréla; Kouto; M’bengué; Kong
- Country: Côte d'Ivoire
- Interactive map of Sudanese style mosques in northern Côte d’Ivoire
- Coordinates: 10°29′25.14″N 6°24′36.6″W

Architecture
- Style: Sudano-Sahelian
- Completed: 17th–19th century
- Materials: Adobe

UNESCO World Heritage Site
- Location: Côte d'Ivoire
- Criteria: Cultural: ii, iv
- Reference: 1648
- Inscription: 2021 (44th Session)
- Area: 0.1298 ha (0.321 acres)
- Buffer zone: 2.3293 ha (5.756 acres)

The Sudanese style mosques in northern Côte d’Ivoire are a collection of eight mosques in northern Côte d'Ivoire (also known as Ivory Coast) that were built between the 17th and 19th centuries in a Sudanese style first brought to the Empire of Mali in the 14th century.

This collection of sites was added to the Tentative List of UNESCO World Heritage Sites on November 29, 2006, and inscribed on the List in the Cultural category in 2021.

== Mosque names and locations ==
- The Mosque of Kaouara, located in the Ouangolodougou Sub-Prefecture
- The Mosque of Tengréla, located in the Tengréla Sub-Prefecture
- The Mosque of Kouto, located in the Kouto Sub-Prefecture
- The Mosque of Nambira, located M’bengué Sub-Prefecture
- Two Mosques of Kong, located in the Kong Sub-Prefecture
