= Dinosaur deposits of Niger =

Coordinates: 16.5°N 8°E

The Dinosaur Deposits of Niger can be found in the Agadez Region, Tchirozérine Department, of Niger.

== Site description ==
The isolated area of dinosaur deposits in Agadez Region consists of well-preserved skeletons over a wide area.

== Vertebrates found ==
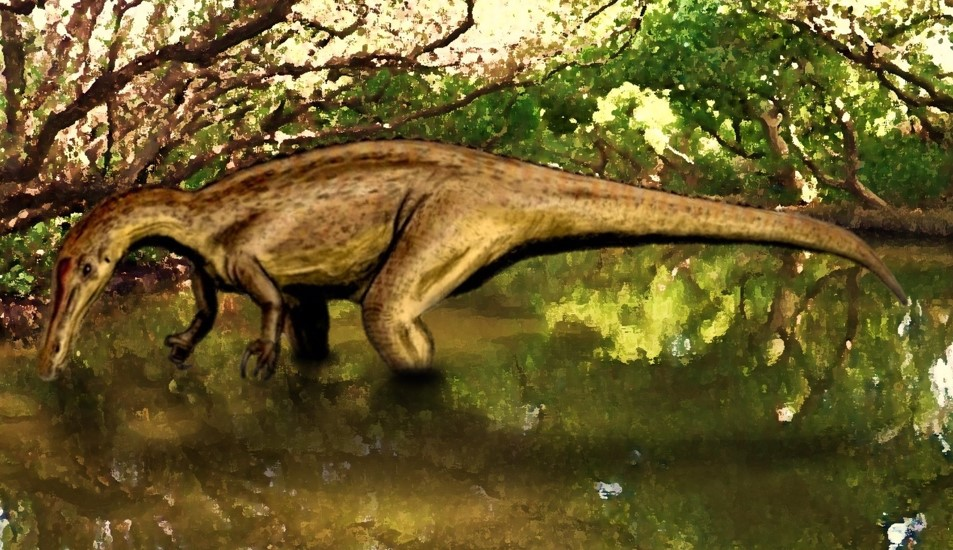
Suchomimus tenerensis

1. Sarcosuchus imperator
2. Ouranosaurus nigeriensis
3. Afrovenator abakensis
4. Suchomimus tenerensis
5. Jobaria tiguidensis
6. Spinostropheus gautieri

== World Heritage Status ==
This site was added to the UNESCO World Heritage Tentative List on May 26, 2006, in the Mixed (Cultural + Natural) category.
