= Ahouakro =

Archaeological park in Côte d'Ivoire

Coordinates: 6°08′N 4°50′W

The archaeological park of Ahouakro is located in northern Tiassalé Department, Ivory Coast.

== Site Description ==
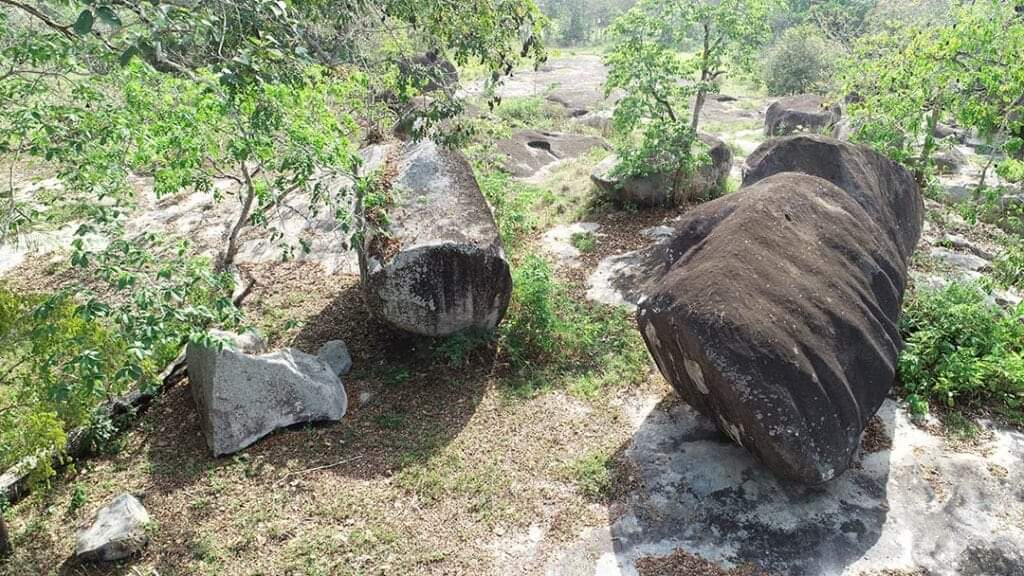
Ahouakro

The Archaeological Park houses many magmatic megaliths, or large rock formations, that the local people have personified with human characters. Archaeological finds in the park include stone sharpening tools and Neolithic period rock art.

== World Heritage Status ==
This site was added to the UNESCO World Heritage Tentative List on November 29, 2006, in the Mixed (Cultural & Natural) category.
