= Wildlife of Niger =

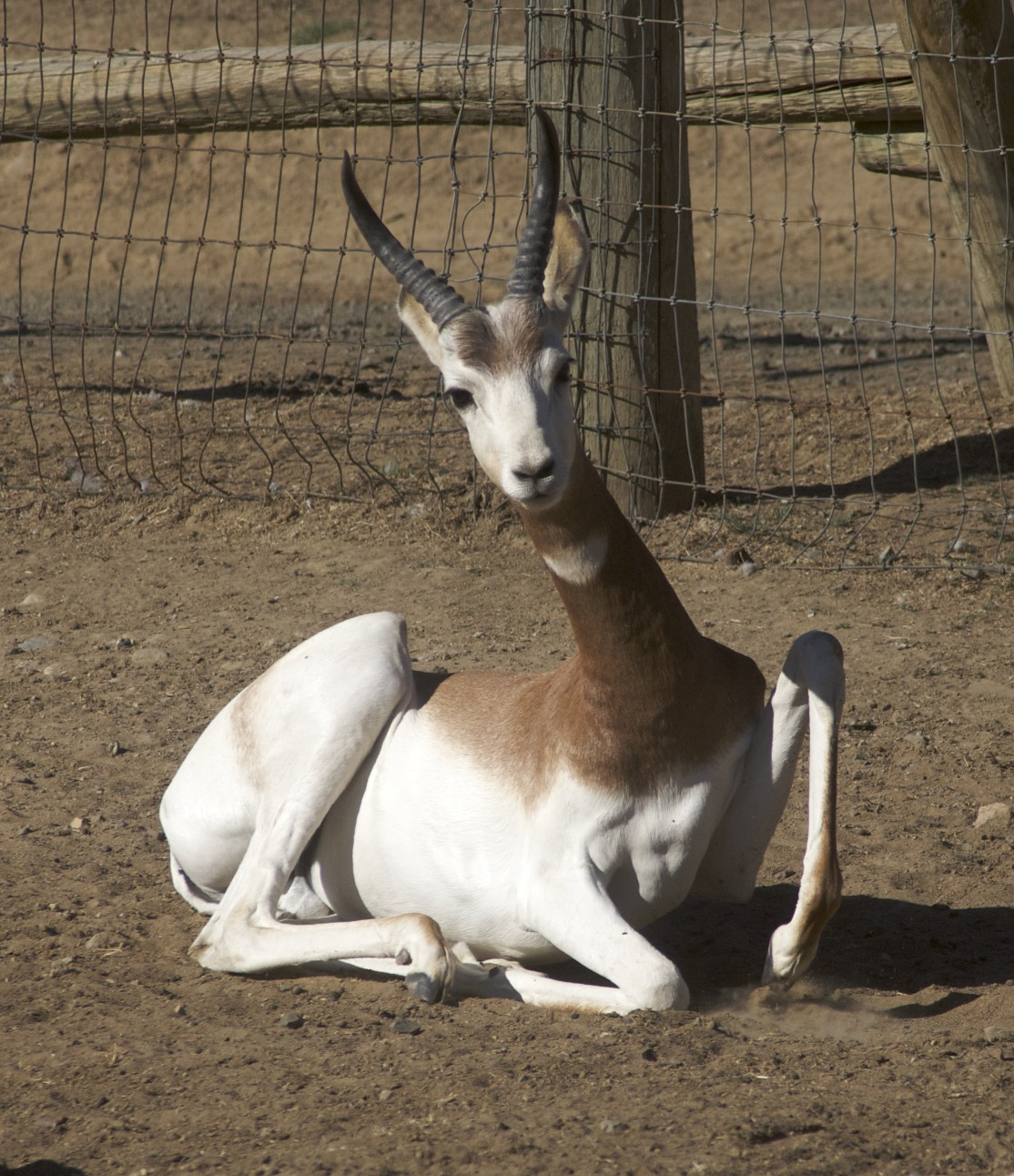
Gazella dama, national symbol of Niger

The wildlife of Niger is composed of its flora and fauna. The protected areas in the country total about 8.5 million hectares (21 million acres), which is 6.6 percent of the land area of the country, a figure which is expected to eventually reach the 11‑percent target fixed by the IUCN with the addition of more areas under the reserve category. Conservation of wildlife is ensured by laws and regulations enacted by the government of Niger, which has enforced a permanent ban on hunting so that animals such as lions, hippos and giraffes are safe in the wild.

There are 136 mammal species in Niger, of which two are critically endangered, two are endangered, nine are vulnerable, and one is near-threatened. One of the species listed for Niger can no longer be found in the wild. Bird Life International has reported 528 species of birds of which three are globally threatened and one is introduced; many species may yet be discovered in the rich avifauna here in spite of thin vegetation.

The Iullemeden, a rich underground aquifer, underlies Niger and its neighbors Mali and Nigeria. It is closely monitored and these countries are trying to stop overexploitation lowering round water levels and reducing storage in Lake Chad and perennial flows of the Niger River. The wildlife is largely dependent on those sources.

The dama gazelle (Nanger dama) has become a national symbol. Under the Hausa name meyna or ménas the dama appears on the badge of the Niger national football team, who are popularly called the Ménas.

== Legal provisions ==
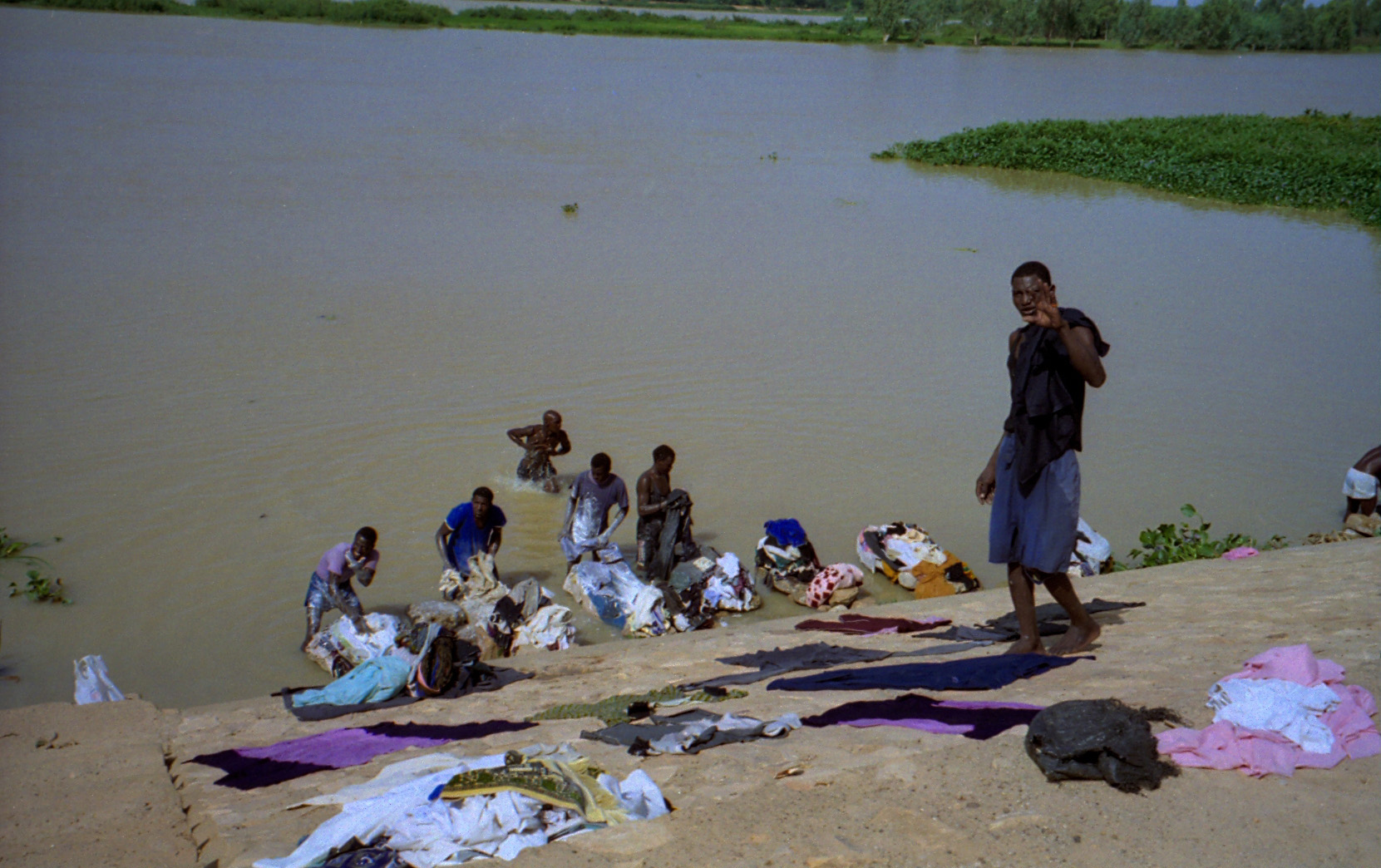
The Niger River in Niamey, the capital city

French colonial laws were the initial basis for environmental legislation. Hunting was officially banned in 1974. Since independence, laws have been enacted and a large number of wildlife reserves and national parks have been established by the government of Niger.

=== Local social attitudes towards the environment ===
While the country is not lacking laws about water, forests and trees on arable land, flora and fauna, the main issue is of establishing proper implementation mechanism. A general sense of lack of any utility of the wildlife persists.

However, some of the local people in some regions feel the need to preserve a few species of birds and sacred forests for posterity. In the Air Mountains near Tchirzorone, a local marabout (a religious leader)) prevents destruction of trees and animals. They are also preserved for their medicinal qualities. In fact, the arrival of Abdim's stork (Ciconia abdimii) is an indication of the arrival of monsoon season which farmers take as a signal to prepare their fields for the rains and new season crops.

Its dependence on international institutions and NGOs for assistance for wildlife conservation is quite large as the finances of the state are inadequate to meet the annual expenses.

== Geography ==
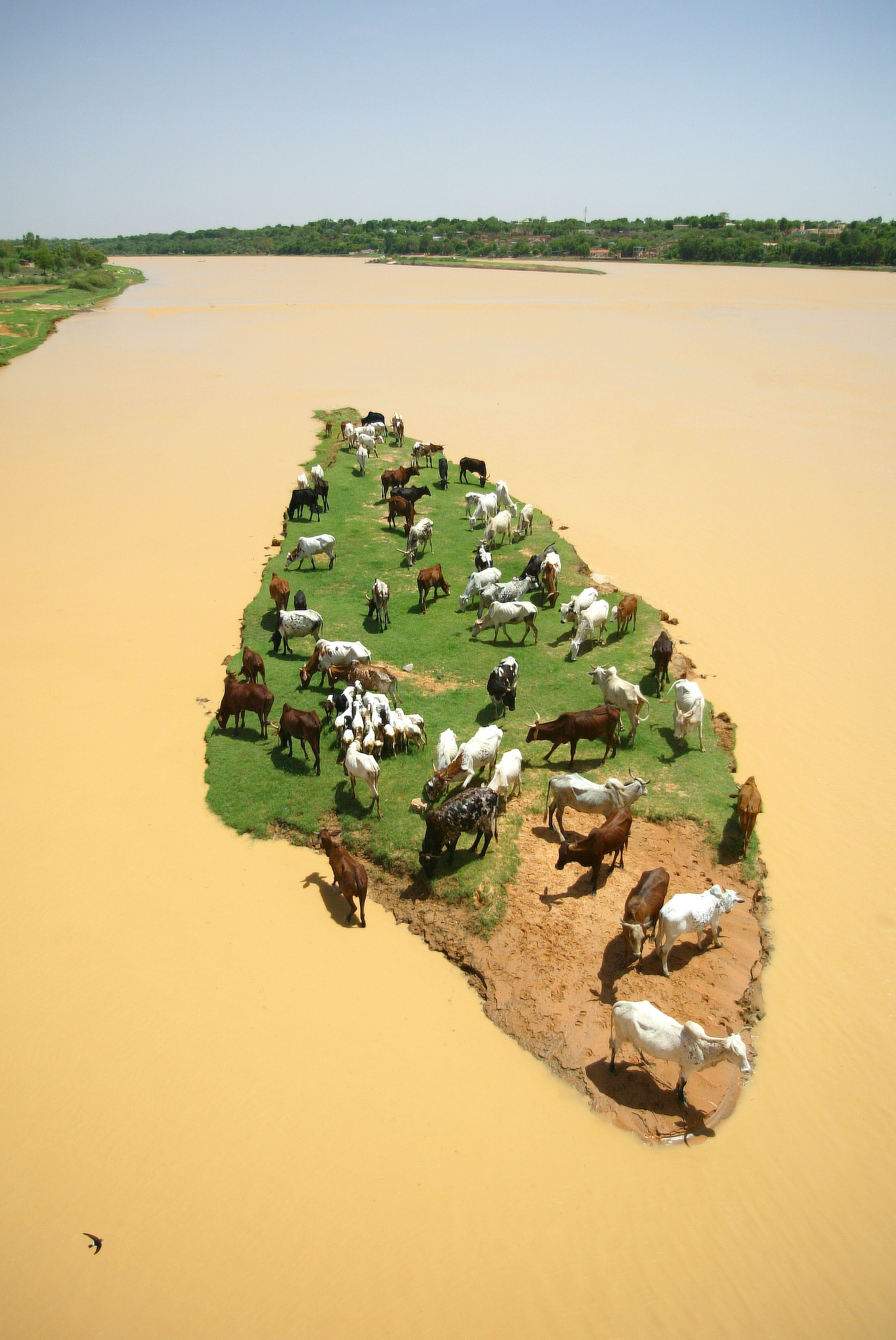
Grazing on an island in the Niger River

As a landlocked country of the sub-Saharan region, its topography is covered with sand dunes, deserts, uplands and so forth, spread over three broad regions: the northern desert zone; the middle zone comprising the semi-arid zone; and the southwest zone which has fertile terrain. It shares international borders with Nigeria, Chad, Algeria, Mali, Burkina Faso, Benin and Libya. Wildlife crosses the borders freely, so national parks and reserves are managed under joint cooperation programs where possible.

Niger is comparatively flat with the lowest point at 200 metres (660 ft) on the Niger River. Tertiary sediments in horizontal layers is the common geological formation in the lowlands. Plateaux created from the sediment deposits are superimposed by laterite formations not subject to erosion. Sand deposits are a common feature in low-lying areas. The upland areas have the scenic Aïr Mountains in the central north with Mount Greboun (2,310 metres (7,580 ft)), the Djado plateau in the north-east with elevation varying between 800 metres (2,600 ft) and 1,000 metres (3,300 ft), and the Termit Massif which forms the central east part of the country, the maximum elevation is 710 metres (2,330 ft).

In these hilly areas rainfall is heavy compared to the lowlands surrounding them. This condition also dictates the vegetation in the hilly areas, and even Mediterranean and Afromontane species are reported. Apart from the Niger River, the other sources of perennial surface water is the Yobe River. In the southern region of the country where rainfall is adequate and has fertile and wooded landscape, dry-land agriculture is practiced.

Drainage from this mountain ranges flows into the Niger River, the only perennial source in the country, which flows in the southwest. It is a crucial source of water for the wildlife of the country. Another source of surface water is Lake Chad, which is an ephemeral lake as it gets filled only during rains, and during the dry season (January to May) puddles of water are seen. Over the years its size has reduced.

Another source of water is ground water from a rich aquifer called the Iullemeden which extends into the neighboring countries of Mali and Nigeria and it is overexploited. Laws have been put in place by the three countries to prevent over extraction to avoid lowering of water table and also affecting flows into the Niger River. Oases is also a source of water in the desert region of the country.

=== Climate ===
Niger's climate, which dictates its wildlife distribution, is subtropical in the north and tropical in the south and data of Niamey is an indicator for the entire country. Drought conditions are quite common as the monsoon rainy season is short and its distribution in the three geographical regions vary.

While average rainfall for the country is reported as 600 millimetres (24 in)—May to September—its incidence is heavy to the extent of 50 millimetres (2.0 in) per day causing much of the flows draining out in quick time as surface flow without enriching the ground water aquifer. This condition coupled with high temperatures cause drought situation in many years affecting the vegetation.

Distribution of the rainfall varies across the country. In the northern Sahara desert region (covering about 50 percent of Niger) it is only 100 millimetres (3.9 in) or less annually, the Sahelian grasslands in the south receives 150–350 millimetres (5.9–13.8 in) during the monsoon months of June, July and August, and in the southern Sahelian zone, the annual rainfall varies between 350 millimetres (14 in) and 600 millimetres (24 in) during the monsoon months of June to September.

Temperatures average between 30 °C (86 °F) and 50 °C (122 °F). Milder cold temperatures are reported during December, January and February. It is for this that the vegetation in the wildlife of the country richness is very limited; the Savannah region recording herbaceous species of plants and trees. The annual temperature variation between northeast and the southwest is 16 °C (61 °F) and 9 °C (48 °F) respectively.

== National parks and reserves ==
IUCN protected area in Niger

Niger's protected areas comprise about 7.7 percent of the total land area. Six of the reserves are fully categorized under the IUCN.

The protected areas are:

- Aïr and Ténéré National Nature Reserve 7,736,000 hectares (19,120,000 acres)
  - including the Addax Sanctuary 1,280,500 hectares (3,164,000 acres)
- Tamou Reserve, a total faunal reserve; 75,000 hectares (190,000 acres)
- Gadabedji Reserve, a total reserve; 76,000 hectares (190,000 acres)
- Tadres Reserve
- Tamou Reserve
- Dosso Reserve, a partial faunal reserve; 306,000 hectares (760,000 acres)
- Dallol Bosso
- Kokorou Wetland
- Termit Massif Reserve, faunal reserve buffer zone
- W National Park 220,000 hectares (540,000 acres)

This is apart from 79 forest reserves covering 212,000 hectares (520,000 acres) and 51 restoration and land protection areas of 69,000 hectares (170,000 acres) encompassing three geographic regions; these are administered by the Direction de l'Environnement of the MHE. A few fishing reserves to conserve aquatic resources have been proposed. Four wetlands have been included under the Ramsar Convention on Wetlands.

=== W National Park ===
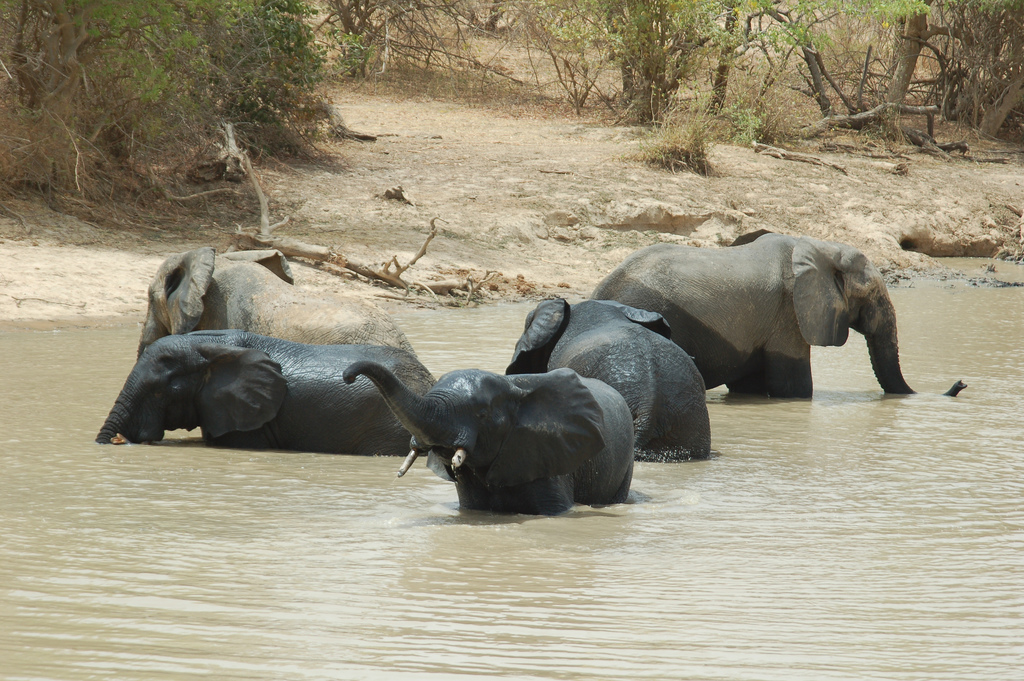
Elephants in the park

W National Park, encompassing an area of 220,000 hectares (540,000 acres), is located 125 kilometres (78 mi) south of the Niamey, the capital of Niger, in the southwestern corner of Niger. This trans-border park has the affix of letter "W", as it is located in a bend of the Niger River which meanders in this stretch of the park to form the figure "W". As it is a transborder park, its management is under the control of Benin, Burkina Faso, and Niger. It is home for four of the five big animal species – the elephant, lion, African buffalo and the leopard. Within the park, the savanna habitat extends over an area of 10,000 square kilometres (3,900 sq mi).

The park is very rich in birds, with 450 species reported, which is said to be "one of the largest varieties anywhere on earth". Hippos, jackals and many types of monkeys, snakes and reptiles are commonly reported. It is a World Heritage Site and also a Regional Biosphere Reserve. It is reported to be last surviving population of the West African giraffe (Giraffa peralta).

=== Aïr and Ténéré Reserve ===
The Aïr and Ténéré Reserves of 80,000 square kilometres (31,000 sq mi) (Aïr is a massif and Ténéré is a desert area) have been a UNESCO World Heritage Site since 1991, and were declared endangered in 1998. It encloses both the eastern half of the Aïr Mountains and the western sections of the Ténéré desert. It is the second largest nature reserve in Africa, and the fourth largest in the world.

The reserve is rich in fauna and flora. Home to a dwindling population of ostriches, the Sahara conservation efforts are put in place to increase the number of this species in the reserve. It encloses the Addax Sanctuary Strict Nature Reserve, established in 1988, as a core area, specifically to protect the addax (Addax nasomaculatus). It is also identified by BirdLife International as an Important Bird Area.

=== Termit Massif reserve ===
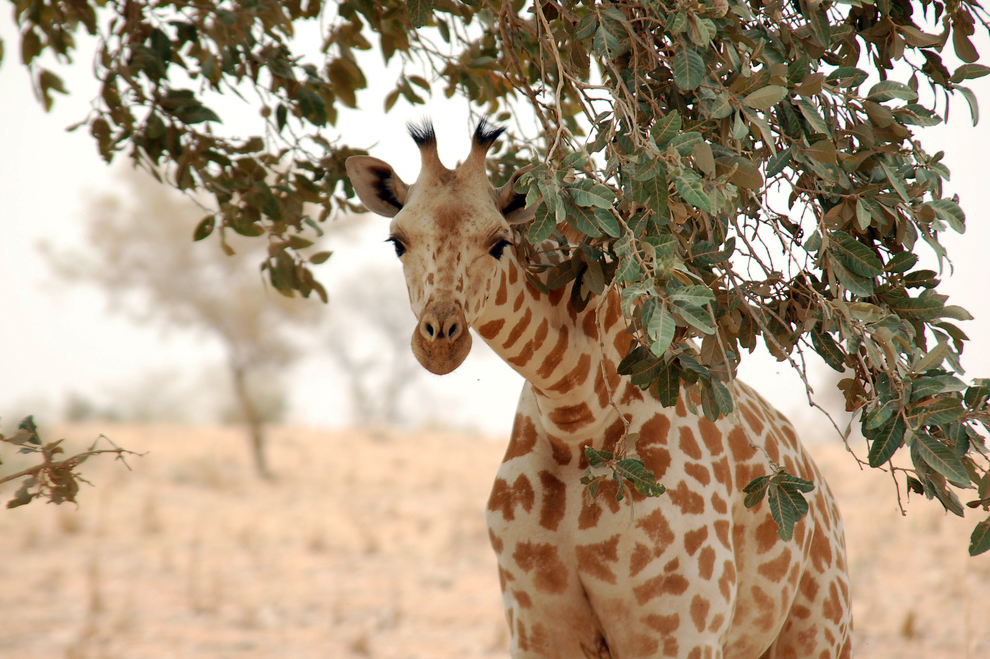
A West African giraffe, also called the Niger giraffe, peeks from under an acacia tree in the tiger bush near Kouré, Niger.

The Termit Massif reserve has been under a decree since 2012. It encloses an area of 100,000 square kilometres (39,000 sq mi) area, which is the largest single reserve in Africa. It has been a Saharan antelope conservation area since 1998 as it has a combination of desert and mountain habitats covering Saharan and Sahelian zones. The whole area of Termit Massif and Tin Toumma desert is considered a biodiversity hotspot. Its arid land fauna consists of addax and dorcas gazelles, cheetah, Barbary sheep and striped hyena, bustards (Nubian and Sudan) and spurred tortoises. It is also the habitat for the critically endangered dama gazelle.

== Wildlife ==
There are 136 mammal species in Niger, of which two are critically endangered, two are endangered, nine are vulnerable, and one is near threatened. One of the species listed for Niger can no longer be found in the wild. Bird Life International has reported 528 species of birds of which three are globally threatened and one is an introduced species; many species may be yet to be discovered in the rich avifauna seen here in spite of thin vegetation.

=== Flora ===
The desert ecosystems dominates the land topography of Niger. In spite of this arid climate, it has 2,124 plant species of which 210 have nutritive value (particularly important during famine). Floral vegetation in the wildlife of Niger is very limited due to the climatic conditions. The floral species reported in the Savannah region consist generally of Bombax costatum, one of the kapok trees; Adansonia digitata, one of the baobabs; West African mahogany (Khaya spp.) or African mahogany (Afzelia africana); shea tree species; the prickly grass, Cenchrus biflorus; and acacia trees. The total forest area reported at 11.2 million ha is 8 percent of the land area of the country including 0.65 of classified forests.

=== Fauna ===
==== Mammals ====
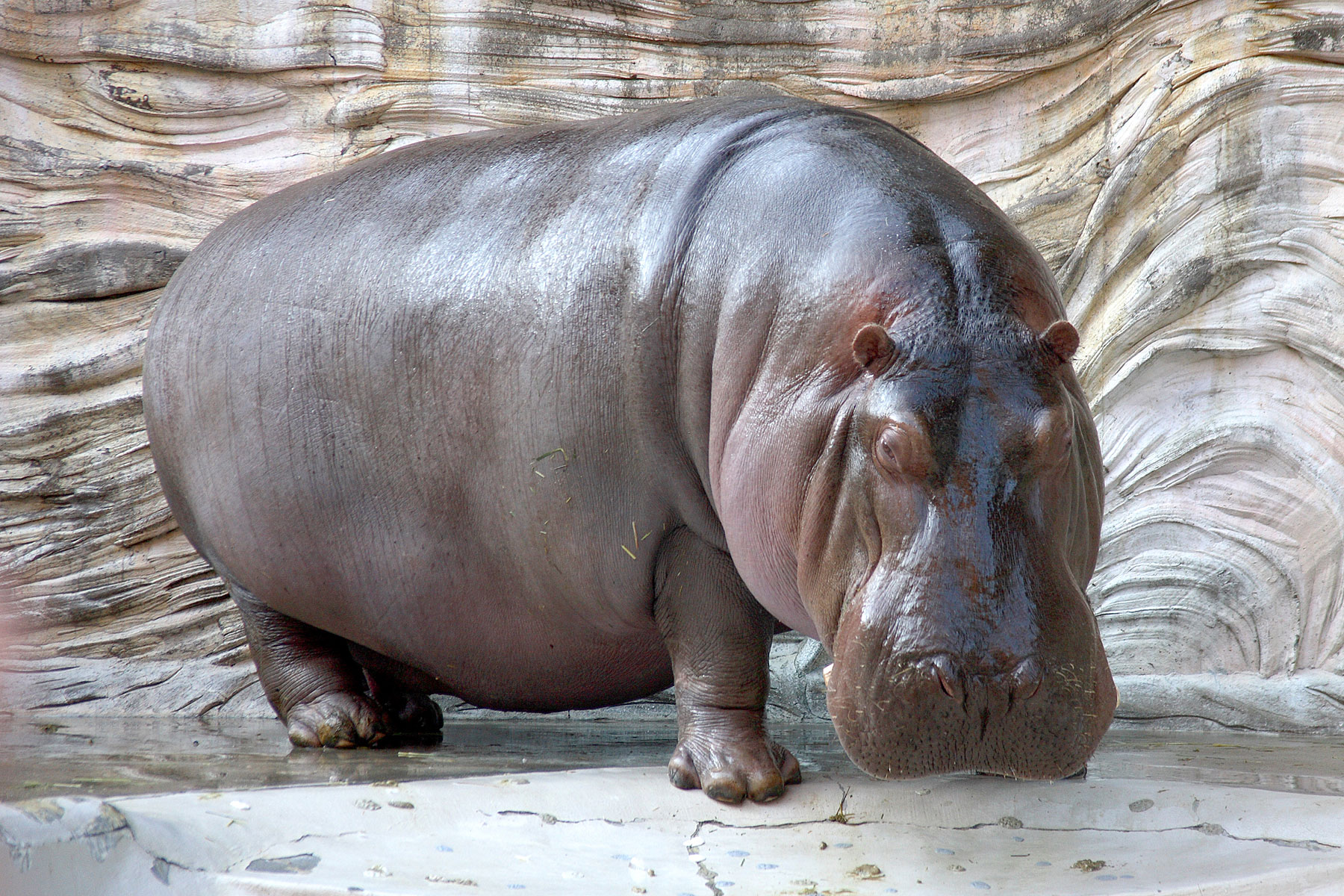
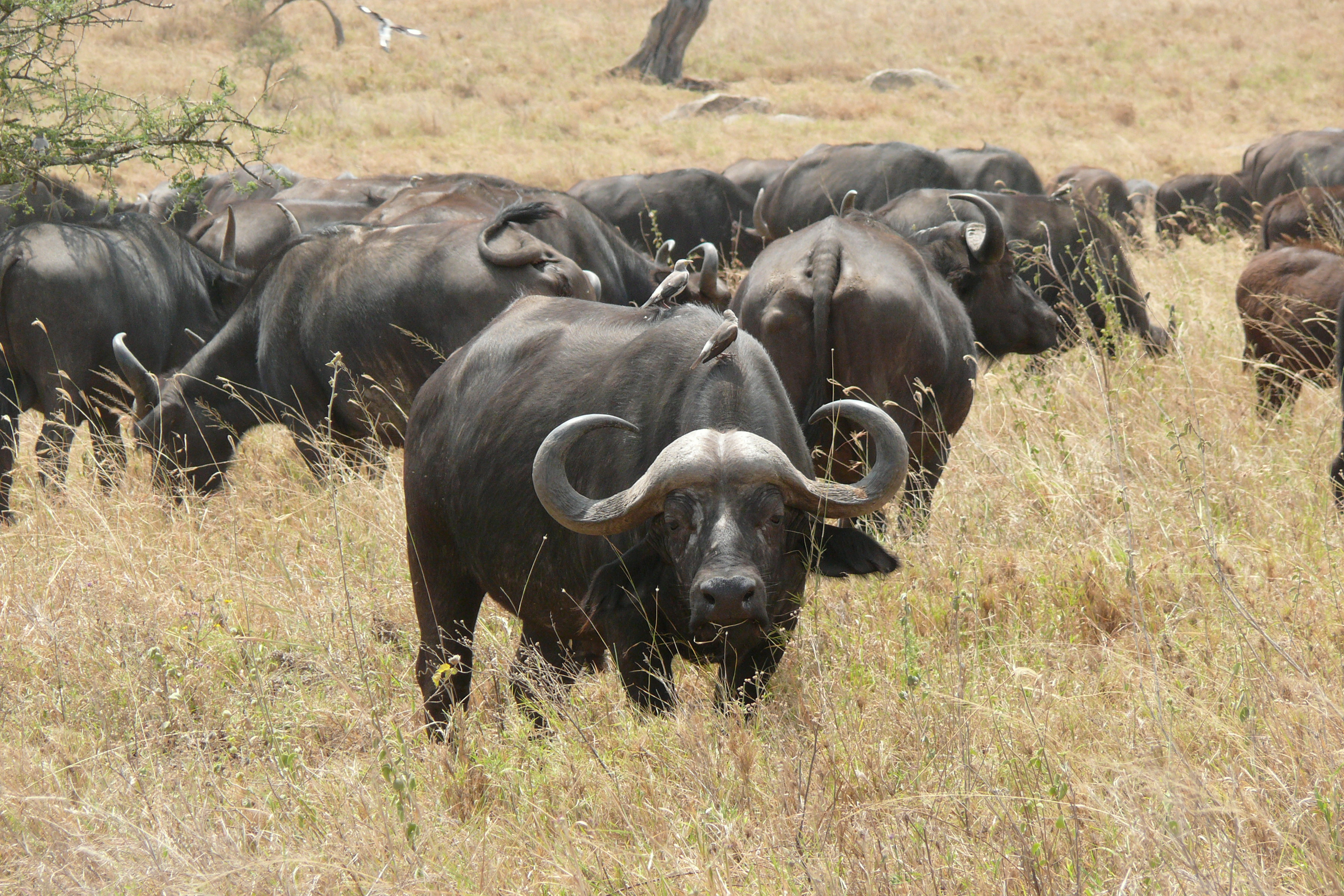
Left: hippopotamus (Hippopotamus amphibius); right: African buffalo (Syncerus caffer)

There are 3200 faunal species which includes 2021 insects. The topographic and climatic conditions of the country has resulted in faunal species dominated by rare species such as African bush elephant (Loxodonta africana), striped hyena, Northwest African cheetah (Acinonyx jubatus hecki), waterbuck, African leopard (Panthera pardus pardus), West African lion (Panthera leo senegalensis), antelope, common warthog (Phacochoerus africanus), scimitar oryx (Oryx dammah), hippopotamuses (Hippopotamus amphibius) in the Niger River, crocodiles, horned vipers, lizards, pythons, manatee, the endemic Nigerian giraffe (Giraffa camelopardalis peralta) which is endangered, the Critically Endangered dama gazelle, which is the national symbol of Niger (named meyna or ménas in the Hausa language) as well as Soemmerring's gazelle (Nanger soemmerringii), Grant's gazelle (Nanger granti) and slender-horned gazelle (Gazella leptoceros).

The population of the dama species, according to IUCN, declined from the stage of Vulnerable in 1986, Endangered in 1990 to Critically Endangered in 2006. Its numbers are low in the eastern Aïr and Ténéré National Nature Reserve in Niger, and in the border region of Mali and Niger; this decline is attributed to loss of habitat and mostly to indiscriminate hunting.

Four species of sympatric canids, the Egyptian wolf, Rüppell's fox, pale fox and fennec, two small cats species of Saharan sand cat and African wildcat, caracal, Striped hyena and Northeast African cheetah are also particularly reported from the Termit and Tin Toumma Reserves. To preserve the wildlife of this area, the Termit Reserve has been extended to include Tin Toumma region to cover an area of 100,000 km^{2}, the largest single reserve in Africa.

==== Avifauna ====
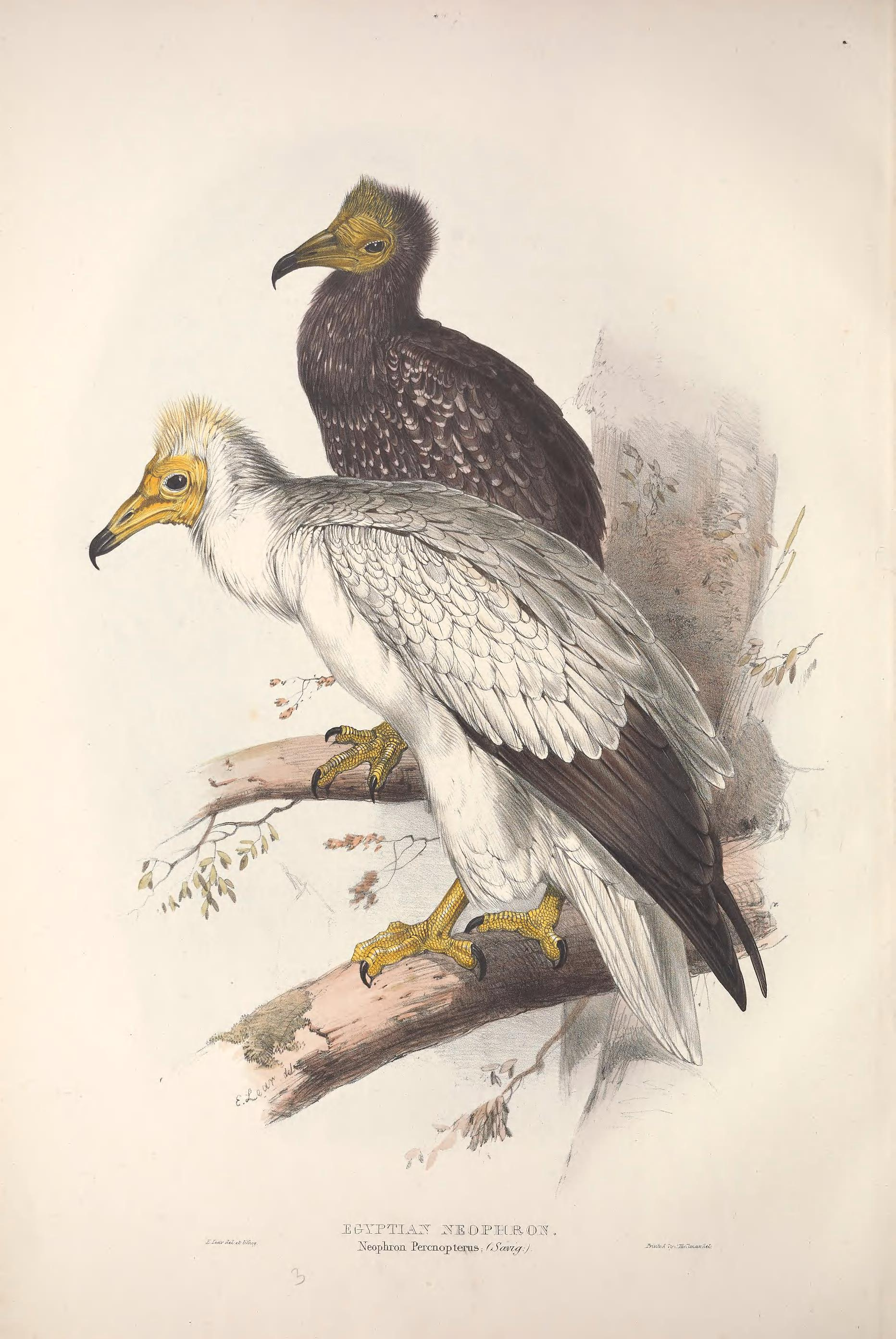
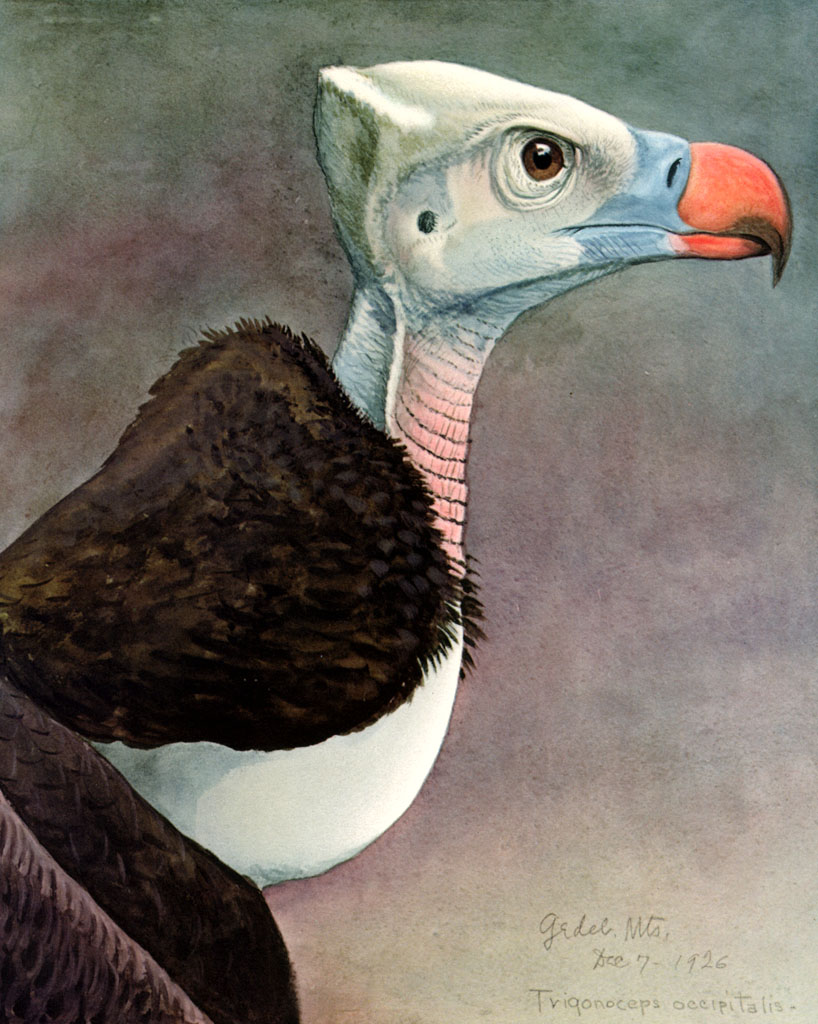
Left: Egyptian vulture (Neophron percnopterus); right: white-headed vulture (Trigonoceps occipitalis)

The number of avifaunal species reported is 528 to 530. Species of birds with the IUCN designations of Least Concern (LC), Near-threatened (NT), Vulnerable (VU) or Endangered (EN) are:

- North African ostrich (Struthio camelus camelus, LC);
- ferruginous duck (Aythya nyroca, NT)
- lesser flamingo (Phoenicopterus minor, NT)
- white-backed vulture (Gyps africanus, NT)
- Rueppell's griffon (Gyps rueppellii, NT)
- pallid harrier (Circus macrourus, NT)
- red kite (Milvus milvus, NT)
- Stanley bustard (Neotis denhami, NT)
- Nubian bustard (Neotis nuba, NT)
- corn crake (Crex crex, NT)
- black crowned crane (Balearica pavonina, NT)
- Eurasian curlew (Numenius arquata, NT)
- black-tailed godwit (Limosa limosa, NT)
- great snipe (Gallinago media, NT)
- African skimmer (Rynchops flavirostris, NT)
- European roller (Coracias garrulus, NT)
- red-footed falcon (Falco vespertinus, NT)
- sooty falcon (Falco concolor, NT)
- white-headed vulture (Trigonoceps occipitalis, VU)
- Beaudouin's snake-eagle (Circaetus beaudouini, VU)
- lesser kestrel (Falco naumanni, VU)
- Egyptian vulture (Neophron percnopterus, EN)

Six raptor species are known. There are 41 migrant birds which visit Niger from Europe. Migrant birds are a common sight during the rainy season when the arid area turns into temporary wetland. The species types found are water birds and raptors. It is also noted that a few bird species such as nightingales and whinchats migrate during summer season to gardens in Europe. The country does not have any endemic or near endemic species of birds.

==== Reptiles ====
The notable reptiles are the Nile crocodile (Crocodylus niloticus) and lizard species such as Varanus griseus and Varanus niloticus. Also reported are the python species Python sebae and Python regius. Tortoise species include the African spurred tortoise (Testudo sulcata); aquatic turtle species include Trionyx triunguis and Pelomedusa subrufa.

==== Aquafauna ====
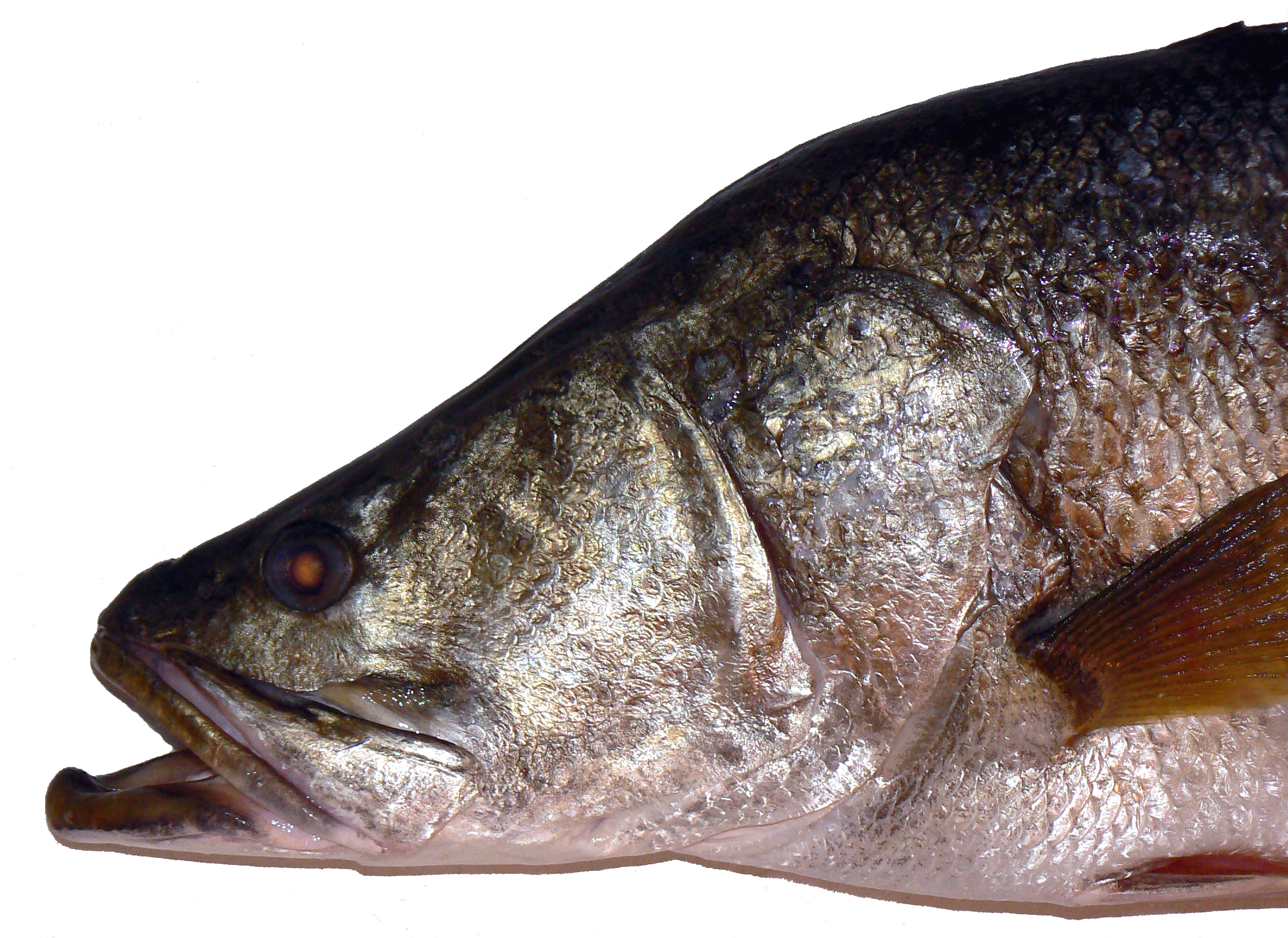
A Nile perch (Lates niloticus)

The Niger River and Lake Chad are fish habitats. Lake Chad holds 85 fish species. The notable species is Nile perch (Lates niloticus), which has a rich economic potential. In the dry season, when the lake and water holes dry up, the fishes survive buried in the sands with a mucous protection membrane. Species of amphibians also survive in dry conditions by burying themselves in moist soil layers.

== Threats ==
Environmental issues in Niger include destructive farming practices as a result of population pressure. Illegal hunting, bush fires in some areas, human encroachment upon the flood plains of the Niger River for paddy cultivation are environmental issues. Dams constructed on the Niger River in the neighboring countries of Mali and Guinea and also within Niger itself are also cited as a reason for a reduction of water flow in the Niger River – which has a direct effect upon the environment. A lack of adequate staff to guard wildlife in the parks and reserves is another factor cited for loss of wildlife.
