= List of national parks of Niger =

Niger is home to a number of national parks and protected areas, including two UNESCO-MAB Biosphere Reserves. The protected areas of Niger normally have a designation and status determined by the Government of Niger. Further, fourteen sites also have international designations, applied by UNESCO and the Ramsar Convention on wetlands' protection. Protected lands in Niger are managed by a number of authorities, and the areas of authority and structure have changed a number of times since independence. Some of the first reserves, parks, and protected areas were designated under French Colonial rule, and much of the legal regime is based on these colonial laws. Niger is also party to a number of international agreements and participates in international ecological, conservation, and resource management programs with its neighbors, region, and worldwide.

== Type and number of protected areas ==
Protected lands in Niger fall under both national and international regulation, and are managed by elements of the Nigerien government, as well as regional bodies and international designation oversight bodies. Initial classification of lands as legally protected for conservation of flora, fauna, landscape, and resource protection was done under French Colonial rule beginning in 1936. Much of the legal framework of land management and protection is based on these original regulations. As of the late 1990s, most land management was the area of the Nigerien Natural Resource Management Unit (Cellule de Gestion des Resources Naturelles) of the Inter-ministerial Sub-committee for Rural Development (Sous-Comité Interministériel chargé de la politique de Développement Rural au Niger), which includes ministries focused on environmental issues, industrial resource extraction, economic growth, and farming. Nigerien designated protected areas were administered by the Direction of Fauna, Fisheries and Aquaculture (Direction de la Faune, de la Pêche et de la Pisciculture - DFPP) of the Ministry of Hydrology and the Environment (Ministère de l'Hydraulique et de l'Environnement - MHE). Actual protection is the responsibility of the DFPP's Fauna and Apiculture Management Service (Service d'Aménagement de la Faune et de l'Apiculture - SAFA) which in 1987 had only 40 staff actually managing or guarding sites.

Note: most sites have at least two overlapping designations.

=== National designations ===
Various Nigerien government designations, administered by the "Direction de l'Environnement" office of the Ministry of Hydrology and Environment

- 4 Total Faunal Reserves, the equivalent of the World Commission on Protected Areas/IUCN Category IV - Habitat/Species Management Area
- 1 Partial Faunal Reserve, the equivalent of the World Commission on Protected Areas/IUCN Category IV
- 1 Faunal Reserve Buffer Zone
- 1 National Nature Reserve, the equivalent of the World Commission on Protected Areas/IUCN Category IV
- 1 Strict Nature Reserve, the equivalent of the World Commission on Protected Areas/IUCN Category Ia (Nature Reserve)
- 1 National Park, the equivalent of the World Commission on Protected Areas/IUCN Category II (National Park)

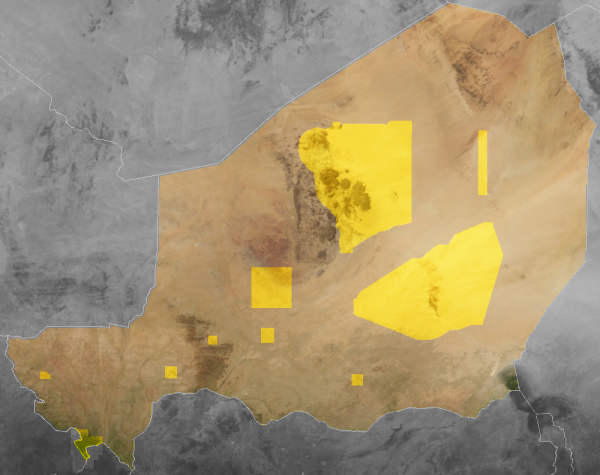
Niger's national parks and protected areas (yellow)

- 79 Forest Reserves (Forêts Classées) totaling 212,000 ha
- 51 restoration and land protection areas totaling 69,000 ha

=== International conventions and programmes ===
Additionally, several sites have international designations as protected areas. As signatories of the below conventions, the Government of Niger places restrictions on use of these lands.

- 12 Wetlands of International Importance (Ramsar). As a Convention signatory, Niger has agreed to establish wetlands protective areas, which may restrict use and promote "the wise use of wetlands in their territory".
- 2 UNESCO World Heritage Convention sites, which are also the
- 2 UNESCO-MAB Biosphere Reserves. Both are listed under Natural criteria vii, ix, x. These are:

VII. "to contain superlative natural phenomena or areas of exceptional natural beauty and aesthetic importance";
IX. "to be outstanding examples representing significant ongoing ecological and biological processes in the evolution and development of terrestrial, fresh water, coastal and marine ecosystems and communities of plants and animals";
X. "to contain the most important and significant natural habitats for in-site conservation of biological diversity, including those containing threatened species of outstanding universal value from the point of view of science or conservation."

- 1 UNESCO World Heritage Convention site is also on the UNESCO List of World Heritage in Danger.

Other international conventions ratified by the Nigerien government include the Convention on Biological Diversity, the Convention on Migratory Species, CITES, the Convention to Combat Desertification, the Convention on Climate Change, the African - Eurasian Waterfowl Agreement, the African Convention on the Conservation of Nature and Natural Resources, the Convention on Game Hunting and the Convention on Plant Protection.

==== Nongovernmental ====
A number of Nigerien sites are recognised by conservation programmes as conservation areas of special importance, even where there is no formal government convention. Notable among these are 15 BirdLife International designated Important Bird Areas (IBA). Many of these are additional designations given to existing Nigerien government, IUCN, or Ramsar designated sites.

== List of sites ==
=== Parks and reserves ===
- Air and Ténéré Natural Reserves: This includes several overlapping designations.

UNESCO World Heritage Site 573 criteria vii, ix, x

World Heritage established 1991, endangered 1993
7,736,000 hectares

Aïr and Ténéré National Nature Reserve, IUCN type IV

Established 1 January 1988
6,456,000 hectares

Aïr and Ténéré Addax Sanctuary

Strict Nature Reserve IUCN type Ia
Established 1 January 1988
1,280,000 hectares

- Gadabedji Total Reserve

Total Faunal Reserve IUCN type IV
Establishment 25 April 1955, by Law No. 3120/S.E. Also a 'fôret classée'
76,000 hectares

- Tadres Total Reserve

Total Faunal Reserve IUCN type IV
788,928 hectares

- Tamou Total Reserve

Total Faunal Reserve IUCN type IV
75,600 hectares

- Termit Massif Total Reserve

Total Faunal Reserve
700,000 hectares

- Termit Massif Faunal Reserve Buffer Zone: This forms a half ring around the southern border of the larger Termit Massif Total Reserve.

Faunal Reserve Buffer Zone

- W du Niger

National Park - IUCN type II
UNESCO World Heritage Site 749 criteria vii, ix, x
World Heritage established 1996
220,000 hectares

- Dosso Partial Faunal Reserve

Partial Faunal Reserve IUCN type IV
Established 1 January 1962
306,500 hectares

=== Ramsar wetland sites ===
- Complexe Kokorou-Namga

Wetlands of International Importance (Ramsar), Inland Wetlands
Established 1981
66,829 hectares

- Dallol Bosso Wetlands

Wetlands of International Importance (Ramsar)
376,162 hectares

- Dallol Maouri Wetlands

Wetlands of International Importance (Ramsar)
318,966 hectares

- La Mare de Dan Doutchi Wetlands

Wetlands of International Importance (Ramsar)
25,366 hectares

- Gueltas et Oasis de l'Aïr Wetlands sites

Wetlands of International Importance (Ramsar)

- La Mare de Lassouri Wetlands

Wetlands of International Importance (Ramsar)

- La Mare de Tabalak Wetlands

Wetlands of International Importance (Ramsar)

- Lac Tchad Wetlands - Niger

Wetlands of International Importance (Ramsar)

- Oasis du Kawar Wetlands

Wetlands of International Importance (Ramsar)

- Parc national du "W" Wetlands - Niger

Wetlands of International Importance (Ramsar)

- Zone humide du moyen Niger Wetlands - Niger

Wetlands of International Importance (Ramsar)

- Zone humide du moyen Niger II Wetlands - Niger

Wetlands of International Importance (Ramsar)

== See also ==
- Geography of Niger
