= Blue Mountains (Niger) =

Mountain range in Niger

Coordinates: 19°34′43″N 9°12′28″E

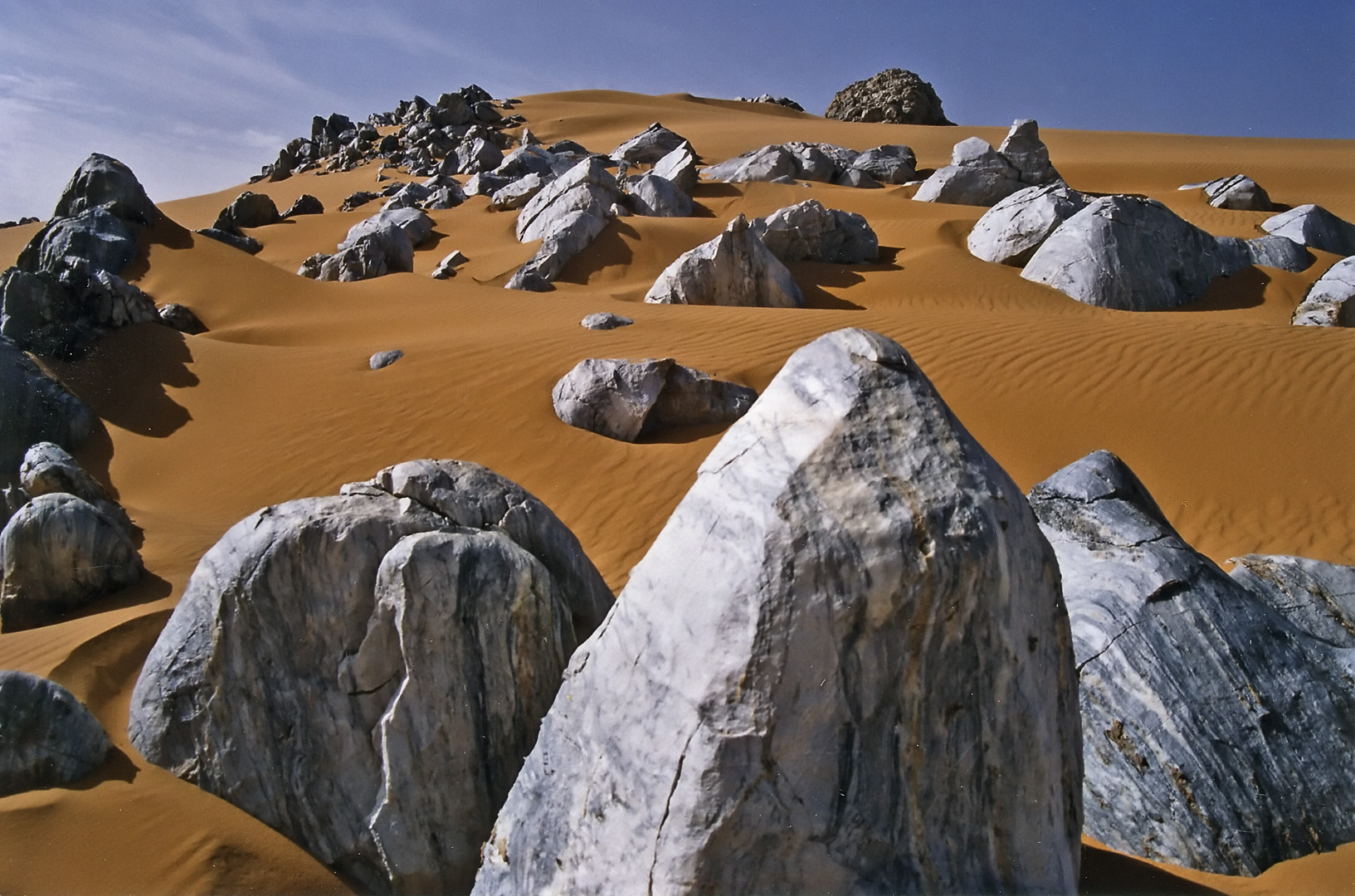
The Montagnes Bleus in the Aïr Massif.

The Blue Mountains (French: Montagnes Bleus, Tamasheq: Izouzaouene, Izouzaoenehe) are an outcrop off the northeastern section of the Aïr Massif in Niger, about 100 km ENE of the town of Iférouane and 30 km NE of the Tezerik oasis. Isolated from the main massif by dunes of the Erg Temet and a flat gravelly desert pavement plain, the rocky outcrop from the desert rises to a height of 924m, almost 300m over the surrounding topography. The area is in Aïr and Ténéré National Nature Reserve, which is a UNESCO World Heritage Site. The mountains themselves are also within the smaller Aïr and Ténéré Addax Sanctuary. They are characterised by cipollino marble outcroppings, which give the hills a bluish tint. Despite their relative remoteness, they became a tourist destination during the upsurge of desert tourism in the late 1990s and early 2000s.
