= Tamou =

- Commune and village
- Location within Niger
- Coordinates: 12°45′N 2°11′E
- Country: Niger
- Region: Tillabéri Region
- Department: Say Department
- Rural Commune: Tamou Commune

Area
  - Total: 1,887 sq mi (4,887 km^{2})

Population (2012 census)
  - Total: 89,782
  - Density: 47.58/sq mi (18.37/km^{2})
- Time zone: UTC+1 (WAT)

Tamou is a village and "Rural commune" in Niger. The town is capital of its Rural Commune in the Say Department of Tillabéri Region, in the far southwest of the nation. It is southwest of Niamey, on the right (western) bank of the Niger River, between the departmental capital Say and the border of Burkina Faso. Tamou Commune is home to the Tamou Total Reserve, a wildlife reserve which is part of the larger W National Park and Transborder Reserve. The Tamou Reserve, in which local people also live, is primarily dedicated to the protection of African Elephant populations which migrate through the region.

As of 2012, it had a population of 89,782.

== Notable people ==
- Diouldé Laya, sociologist
