= Say Department =

Coordinates: 13°07′09″N 1°47′58″E

Say
- Department
- Département de Say
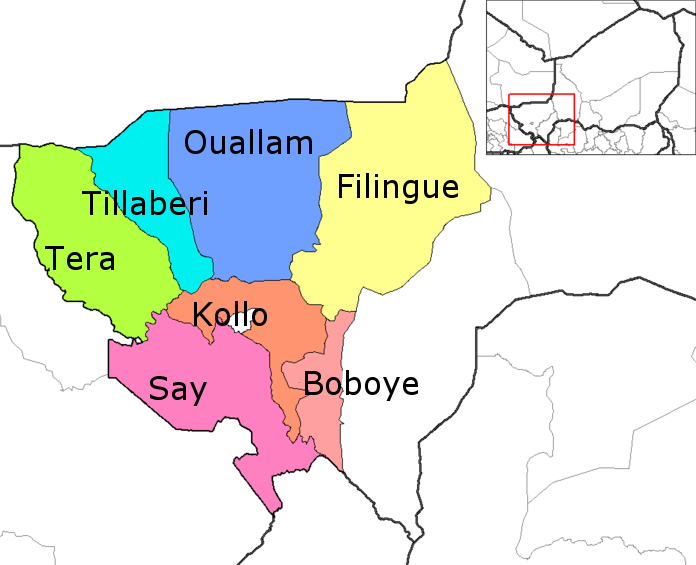
- Say Department
- Country: Niger
- Region: Tillabéri Region
- Departmental: Say

Area
  - Total: 14,430 km^{2} (5,570 sq mi)

Population (2011)
  - Total: 316,439
- Time zone: UTC+1 (GMT 1)

Say is a department of the Tillabéri Region in Niger. Its capital city is Say, and includes the towns of Guéladjo, Tamou, Alambaré and Torodi. It abuts the urban Region of Niamey, and lies across the Niger River to the southwest of the capital. It extends to the Burkina Faso border over 60 km to the west, and the northernmost border with Benin in the south. The Say area is today divided between the riverine valley in the east of the Department, and the more sparsely populated areas to the west, which are intercut with a series of eastward flowing tributaries. The Niger river, a broad shallow channel at Niamey and at Say, passes through a series of gorges and cataracts, called the "W" bend for the shape the river takes, in the south of the Say Department. To the west of these rapids lies what is now the W Regional Park, a sparsely populated area historically plagued by insect-borne diseases of both humans and cattle. Now a park and tourist attraction, its history as a "no mans land" has made it a refuge for remaining wild animals, as well as several undisturbed archeological sites. From at least the 16th century CE, the Songhai proper moved south into this area from the north around what is now Tera. The inhabitants at the time were related to the Gourma people, who form most of the population of the northwestern part of the Department today. In the 18th and 19th centuries, the town of Say was founded by Fulani migrants from the Gao region of modern Mali, with others expanding from what is now northeast Burkina Faso. Between 1810 and the arrival of European writer Heinrich Barth in 1854, Fulani Muslims led by Alfa Mohamed Diobo of Djenné had established the Emirate of Say. The reputation for piety and learning of Mohamed Diobo and his followers helped turn Say from a small river village into a town of 30,000, famed across West Africa as a center of learning.

Say was important during the colonial period, as it formed the point of access for French forces, via Dahomey Colony, to the lower Niger and their attempt to cut off British expansion to the north. This would provide French colonial conquest of regions they hoped would connect their Atlantic colonies with the upper Nile River and French Somaliland. As of 2011, the department had a total population of 316,439 people.
