= Alambaré, Niger =

Alambaré
- Location within Niger
- Coordinates: 12°39′49″N 2°13′58″E
- Country: Niger
- Region: Tillaberi Region
- Department: Say Department
- Commune: Tamou

Alambaré (also: Allambéré, Alembaré) is a village in Tamou Parish, Say Department, Tillaberi Region.

== Geography ==
The village is about 11 kilometres southeast of the main town of Tamou in the rural municipality of the same name, which belongs to the Say department in the Tillabéri region. Other settlements in the vicinity of Alambaré include Boulel in the northwest and Moli Haoussa in the southeast.

Its coordinates are 12°40'0" N and 2°13'52" E in DMS (Degrees Minutes Seconds) or 12.6667 and 2.23111 (in decimal degrees). Its UTM position is DQ10 and its Joint Operation Graphics reference is ND31-14.

== Biology ==
Alambaré is in the middle of the 777.4 km^{2} Tamou Game Reserve. There are many snake species in the village, such as: The African House Snake (Boaedon fuliginosus), White-lipped Snake (Crotaphopeltis hotamboeia), Dasypeltis gansi, West African Sand Snake (Echis ocellatus), Saharan Sand Boa (Eryx muelleri), and the ball python (Python regius).

== Weather ==
The climate is hot and humid. The average temperature is 28 °C. The hottest month is May, at 32 °C, and the coldest is January, at 24 °C. The average rainfall is 750 millimeters per year. The wettest month is August, with 254 millimeters of rain, and the driest is March, with 1 millimeter.

== History ==
Allambaré was founded at the beginning of the 20th century by a farmer named Yéliga Tchintaga. The name of the place comes from the Gourmanchéma sentence for: "place where you can have a good time".

According to research in the 1960s, the area between the Goroubi and Mékrou Rivers was the main centre of the neglected tropical disease onchocerciasis in Niger. The village of Allambaré was also affected. The Armed Conflict Location and Event Data Project recorded a total of 122 violent conflict cases with 394 deaths in the Tillabéri region for the first quarter of 2024 and named Allambaré among the affected places.

== Population ==
As of the census of 2012, there were 1465 people living in 169 households. At the 2001 census, the population was 1189 in 124 households and at the 1988 census, the population was 807 out of 96 households.

== Economy and infrastructure ==
A regionally important weekly market is held in Allambaré. Market day is Saturday. It attracts traders from the main town of Tamou, from the Nigerien capital Niamey and from surrounding villages. It has a cattle market. The National Supply Center for Agricultural Inputs and Materials (CAIMA) maintains a sales outlet in Allambaré.

A Centre de Santé Intégré (CSI) is a health centre. There is a school.

The 158.3-kilometre-long National Road 27 between Niamey and La Tapoa runs through Allambaré. In the village, the easy road of Route 677 to Guiémé branches off from the national road 27.
