= Diouldé Laya =

Diouldé Laya (aka Juulde Layya; 1937 - 27 July 2014) was a noted Nigerien sociologist and from 1977 to 1997 was director of the Centre d'Etudes Linguistiques et Historiques par Tradition Orale (CELHTO) in Niamey. He published widely.

== Background and academic activities ==
Laya was born in Tamou, Say Department, Niger, around the time of Tabaski in 1937.

Prior to being named director of CELHTO, he was director of the Institut de Recherches en Sciences Humaines at Abdou Moumouni University in Niamey (1970–1977).

=== Selected publications ===
His publications include:

- La Voie peule : solidarité pastorale et bienséances sahéliennes, Paris: Nubia, 1984.
- La Tradition orale; problématique et méthodologie des sources de l'histoire africaine, Niamey: CRDTO, 1972.
