= Say, Niger =

Say
- Location in Niger
- Coordinates: 13°06′N 2°22′E
- Country: Niger
- Region: Tillabéri Region
- Department: Say Department
- Established: 15th Century
- Elevation: 180 m (590 ft)

Population (2012 census)
  - City: 58,290
  - Urban: 13,546
  - Metro: 175,625 (Say Department)
  - Summer (DST): UTC+1 (WAT)

Say (Saayi) is a town in southwest Niger, situated on the Niger River. It is the capital of the Say Department in the Tillabéri Region. Say was a small Songhai town prior to the arrival of the Fulani marabout Alfa Mohamed Diobo in the nineteenth century who converted the town to a center for Islamic learning and established the Emirate of Say. The municipality has 58,290 inhabitants, and its economy is dominated by agriculture, herding and small trade. Today, the inhabitants of Say are mostly Peulh, Songhai and Zarma.

== Overview ==
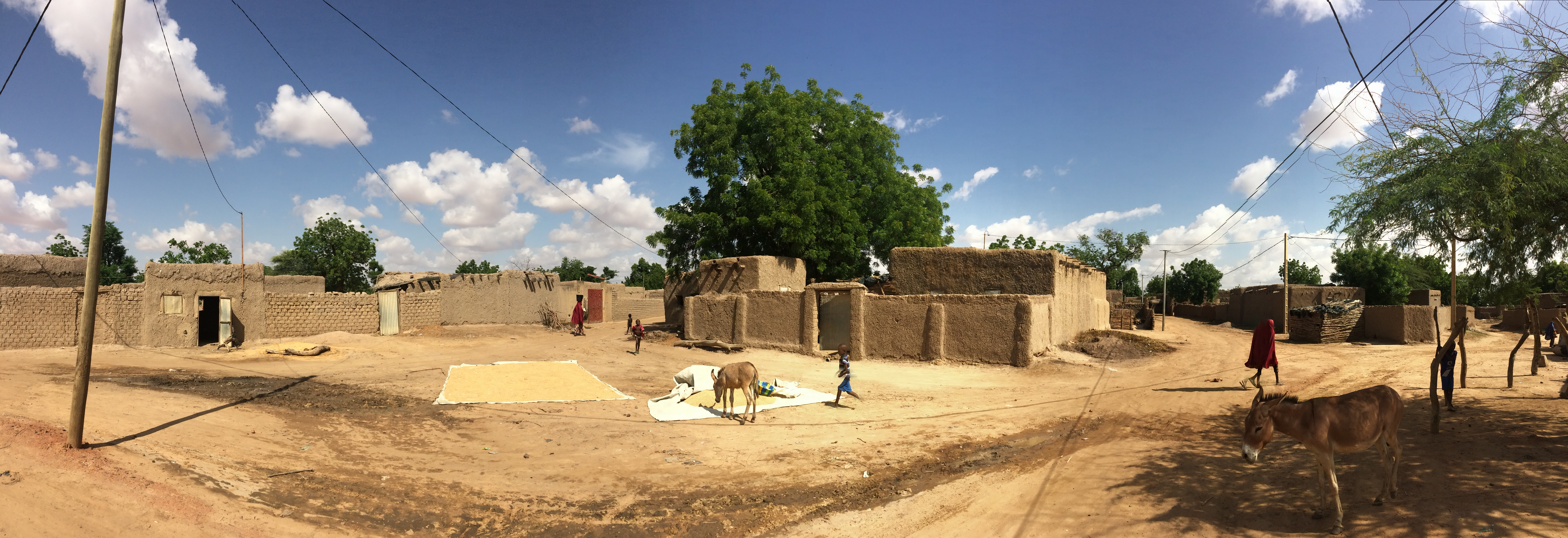
Street scene (2018)

The town houses the Islamic University of Niger (Université Islamique de Say), an institute of international scope, whose founding was decided following a meeting of the Organisation of the Islamic Conference in 1974, but that opened only in 1986. In 1996, it had 400 students, who paid fees much lower than those of the University of Niamey. In Say there is also a forty-year-old College of Secondary Education (Collège d'enseignement secondaire), with nine teachers and 675 students.

== History ==
Say was part of the Songhay Empire, which peaked in the 16th century. When the Songhay collapsed after the 1591 Battle of Tondibi, some of the refugees sheltered in the Say area.

In the nineteenth century, Say became an Emirate under the leadership of the Marabout Alfa Mohamed Diobo. The town was occupied by France on 9 May 1897 and administered from Dahomey until 1907. In 1928, it became part of the cercle of Niamey. Located 57 km from Niamey, not far from the W National Park. The town (now an urban commune) has today 70,000 people but bears little resemblance to the ancient center of Islamic learning. In recognition of its former role, however, Niger's first Madrasa (Islamic School) was set up here in 1957, and in 1974 the Organization of the Islamic Conference designated Say as the site for an Islamic university for West Africa, The new university, the Islamic University of Say, opened its doors in October 1986, with Dr. Abdallah Ben Abdel Mohsen At-Turki as its rector. Say is connected to the capital Niamey by an all-weather road and has a colorful Friday market to which many tourists flock.

== Mining ==
Say is the location of some potential iron ore mines with reserves of about 650MT. An extension of the railway from Benin to Niamey is proposed which would serve the iron ore mines at Say.

== Gallery ==
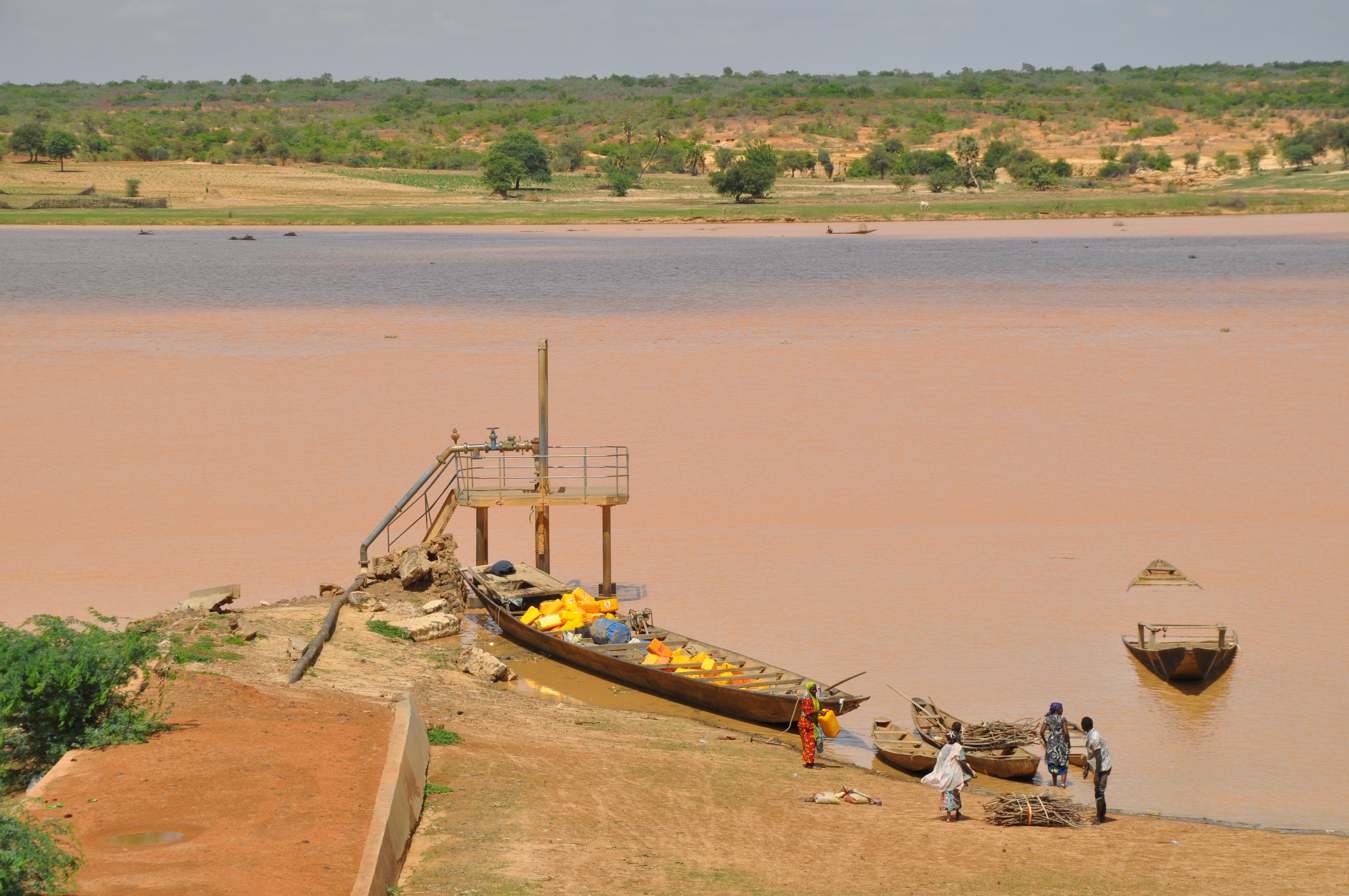
River front, harbor pier

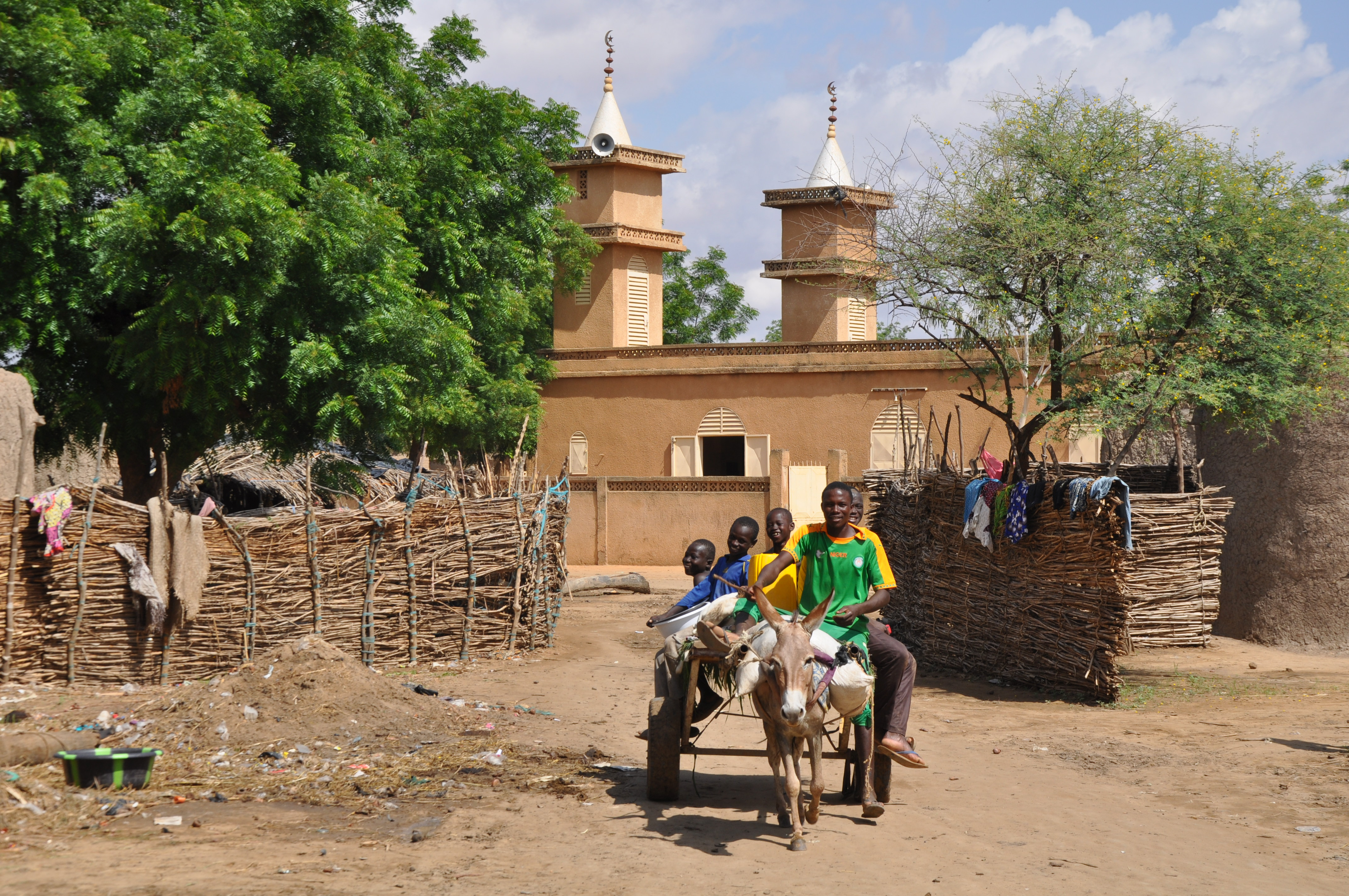
Mosque and donkey cart

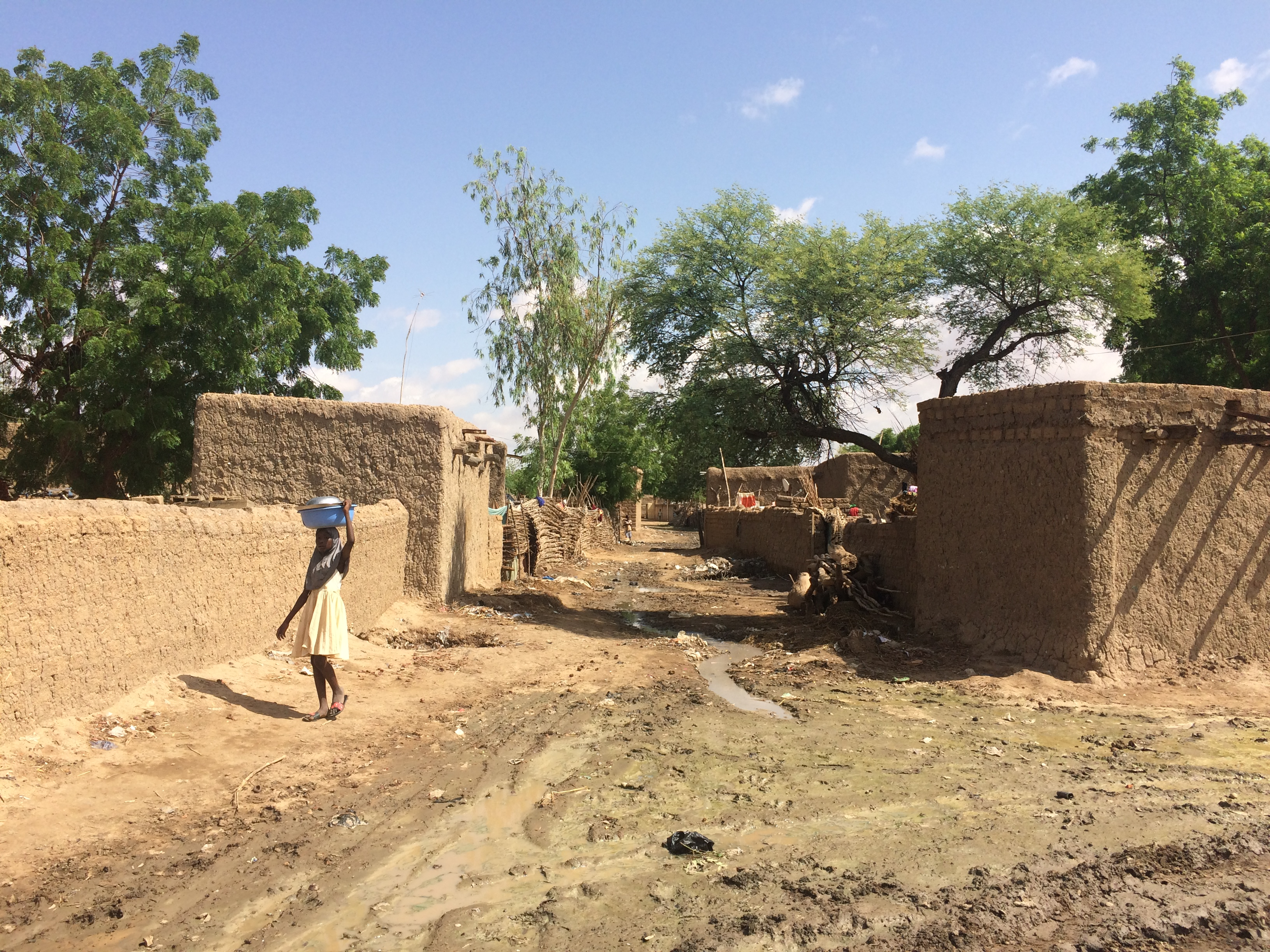
Mud-brick houses

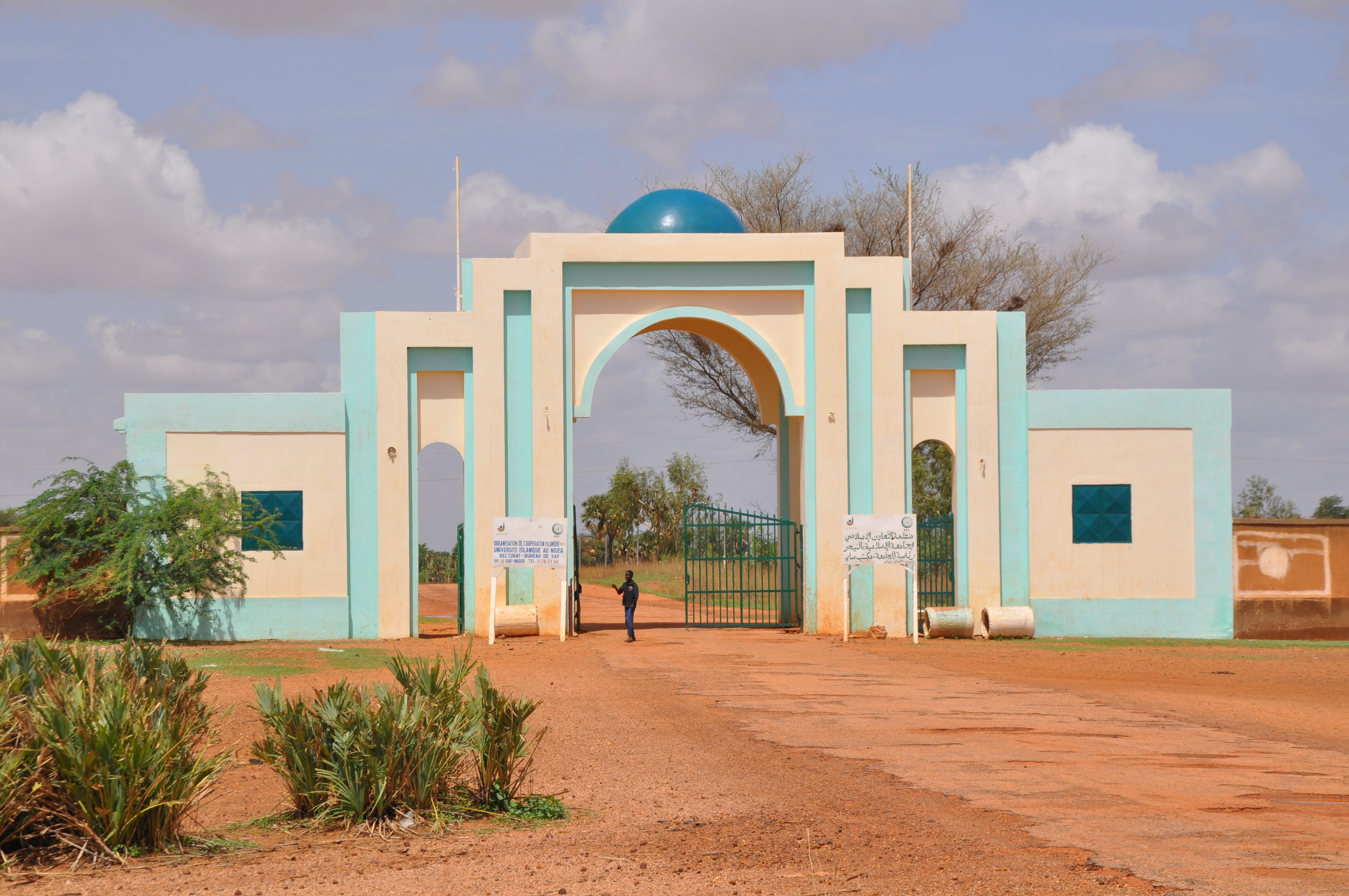
Islamic University, main gate

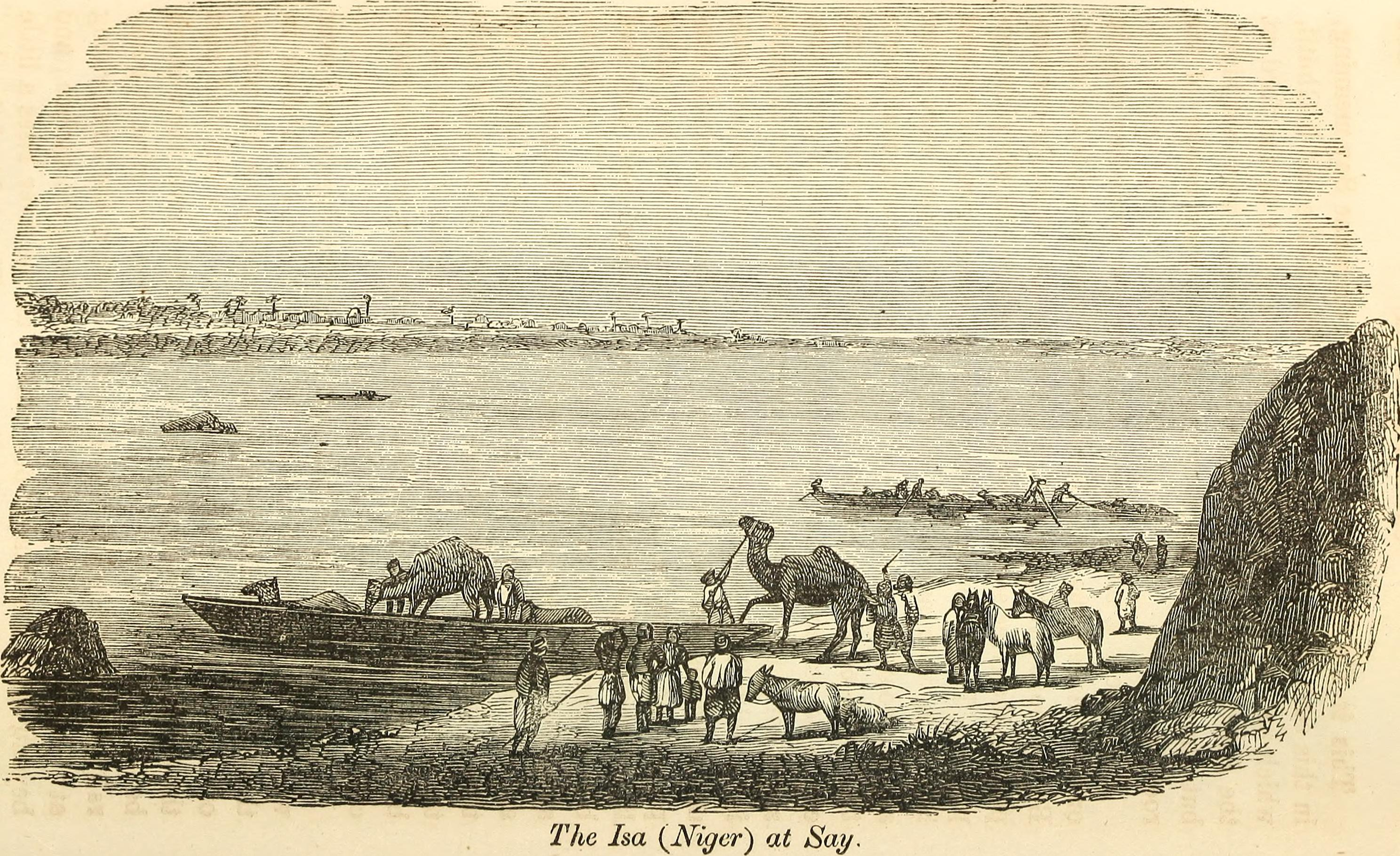
The Niger River at Say in the 1850s

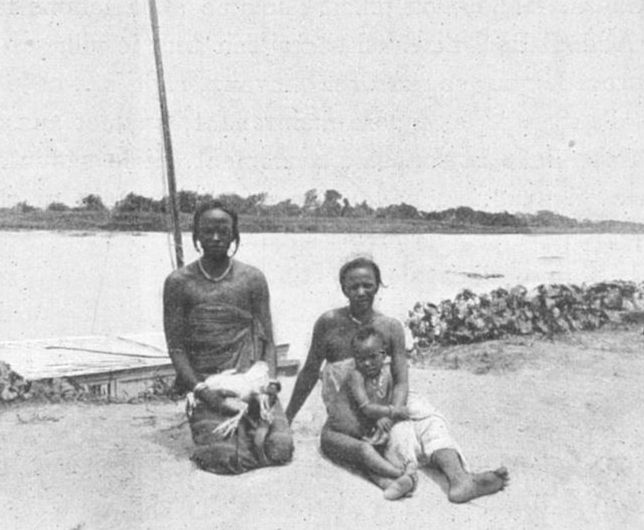
People of Say, 1898

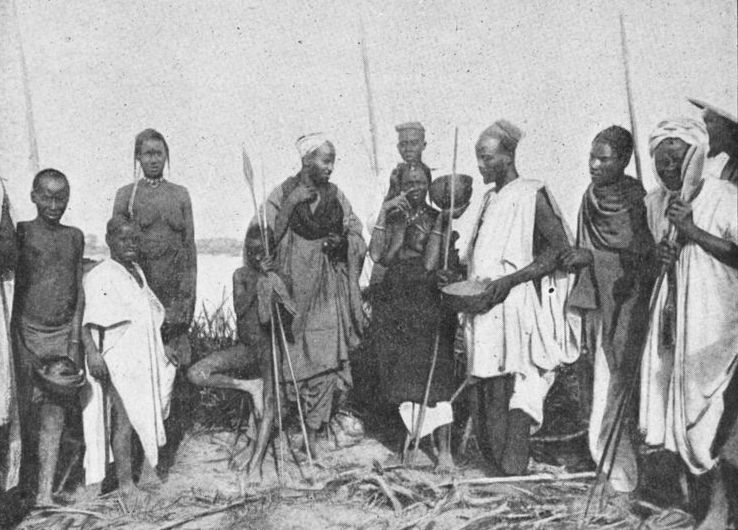
People of Say, 1898

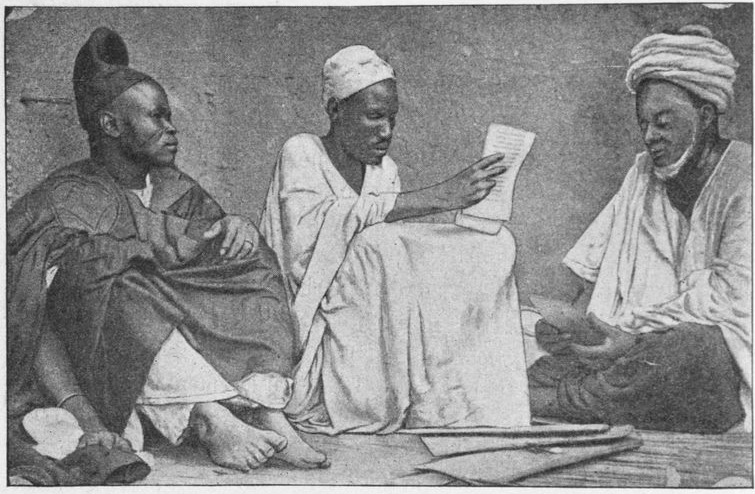
Marabouts of Say, 1912

== See also ==
- Iron ore in Africa
