= Emirate of Say =

- 1825
- Capital: Say
- Common languages: Arabic, Fulani, Songhay, Zarma
- Religion: Islam
- List of rulers of Say
  - 1825—1834: Alfa Mohamed Diobo
  - 1834-1860: Boubacar Modibo
- History
  - Established: 1825
- Today part of: Niger

The Emirate of Say was an Islamic state founded in 1825 by Alfa Mohamed Diobo, a Qadiriyya Sufi leader who came to Say from Djenné (Mali) in 1810. Though Diobo was no conqueror, his control over Say was ensured by both his clerical renown and the diplomatic protection of the Sokoto Empire, also founded by a Fulani Qadiriyya Sufi cleric, Usman Dan Fodio.

In its heyday, the emirate of Say was widely known from Gao to Gaya as a center for Islamic learning and piety. It is reputed to have had at one time 30,000 inhabitants and to have launched its own trans-Saharan caravans. The city of Say has retained from those days a traditional government held by the descendants Of Diobo in the office of "al/aize" (literally, son of the cleric, in zarma). They are as follows; Alfa Mohamed Diobo (1825–1834), Boubacar Modibo (1834–1860), Abdourahman (1860–1872), Moulaye (1872–1874), Abdoulwahidou (1874–1878), Saliha Alfa Baba (1878–1885), Amadou Satourou Modibo (1885–1893), Halirou Abdoulwahabi (1893–1894).
