= Tourism in Niger =

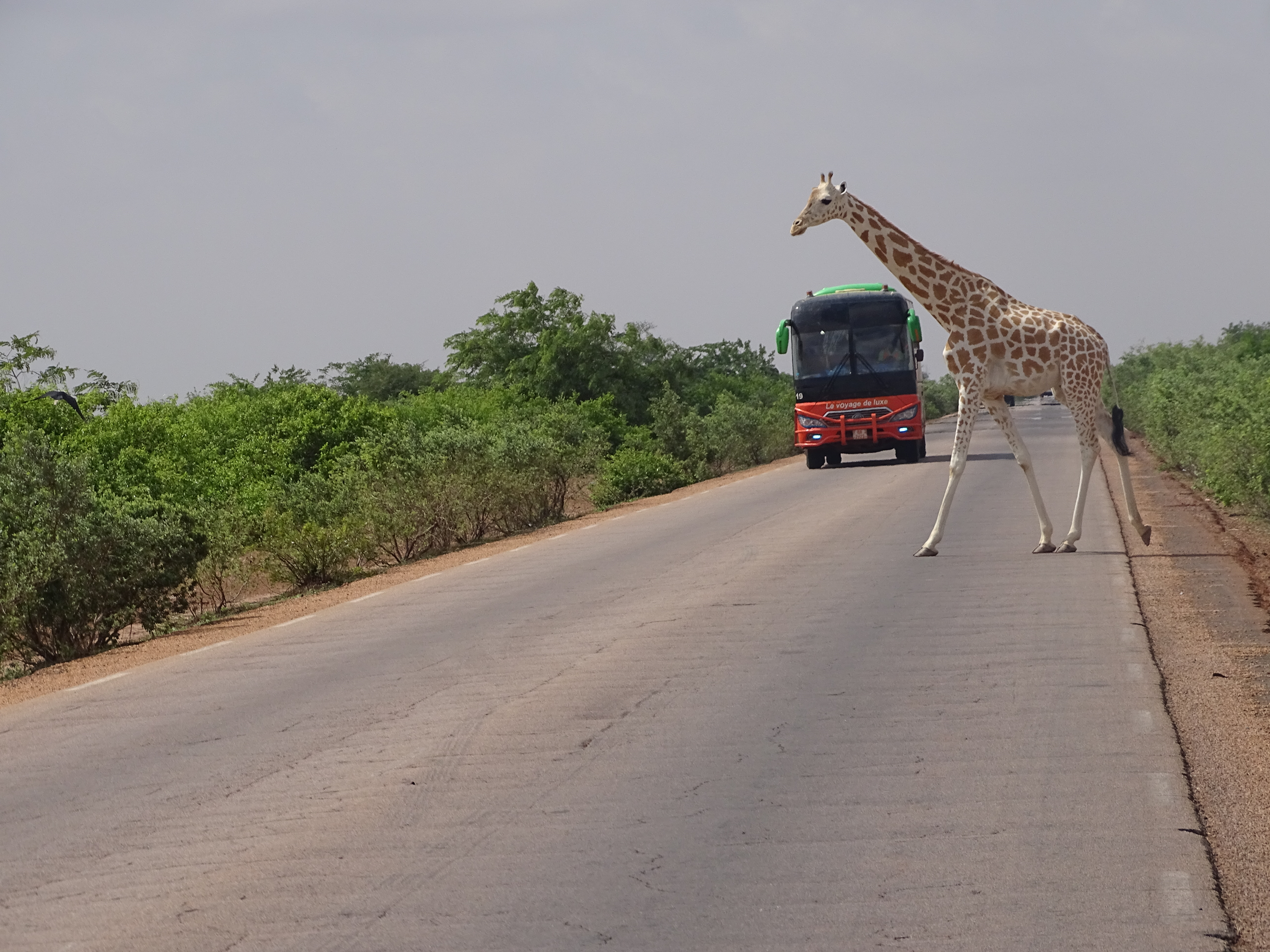

There is relatively limited tourism in Niger. Tourism in Niger is also centered on its natural features and historical sites, although the industry itself is relatively underdeveloped. Most of the tourism industry is in the north, where the city of Agadez allows access to the desert. Other places that see tourism are the capital city, Niamey, areas around the Niger River, and reserves such as Kouré which is known for West African giraffes.

Tourism in Northern Niger started to develop in the 1970s. Tourism dropped during the Tuareg rebellion in the early 90s.

There is an ongoing travel warning to Niger because of terrorism as a result of the Insurgency in the Maghreb (2002–present) and the Boko Haram insurgency. The 2020 Toumour attacks happened on the 12th of December 2020, when Boko Haram militants attacked the village of Toumour, killing 28 people and wounding around 100 people.
