= Alfa Mohamed Diobo =

Islamic scholar

Alfa Mahaman Diobbo
- Marabout of Say
- Reign: 18th Century
- Successor: Alfaizé Boubacar
- Born: Bamba
- Died: Say, Niger
- Burial: Say, Niger
- Father: Alfa Boubacar Salihou
- Religion: Islam

Alfa Mahaman Diobbo was an Islamic preacher, leader and the founder of the Emirate of Say in Say, Niger. In many books, Diobbo is generally presented as the son of a Fulani marabout from Macina (Present-day Mali). Born in Bamba, a town located in the Niger loop, between Gao and Timbuktu. Having become a marabout, he commenced the propagation of the Islam religion in that region.

== Origin ==
The origin of his family and his route are still the subject of controversy. According to Moulaye Hassane, researcher at the Institute for Research in Human Sciences (IRSH) of the Abdou Moumouni University of Niamey, Alfa Mahaman Diobbo is the grandson of the great scholar Alfa Boubacar Salihou. His parents lived in Macina . The principality of Say had very close relations with Sokoto. During the reign of Alphaizé Boubacar (the successor to Mahaman Diobbo), Say acquired real political power and represented Sokoto's authority in the region. Under Say's moral and religious authority, many chiefdoms in the Nigerien region on both banks of the river adopted the title Amirou.
