= Tadres Reserve =

Nature reserve in Niger

Réserve totale de faune du Tadres
- IUCN category IV (habitat/species management area)
- Interactive map of Réserve totale de faune du Tadres
- Location: Agadez Region, Niger
- Nearest city: Agadez
- Coordinates: 15°42′0″N 7°59′0″E
- Area: 788,928 ha (1,949,480 acres)
- Governing body: Parcs Nationaux & Reserves - Niger

The Tadrès Total Reserve (T'adéras/Tadress) (Réserve totale de Faune du Tadrès) is a nature reserve in the central north of Niger, southwest the city of Agadez. It is a Total Faunal Reserve IUCN category IV, covering some 788,928 hectares within the Agadez Region. The reserve follows the northeast - southwest flow of the Tadrès valley, a wadi (Hausa: kori) or seasonal wash and ancient river bed south of the Aïr Mountains. It was originally dedicated to the protection of oryx populations which have largely disappeared from the region. In the 1940s, the valley was an important migration route for the animals from the Tenere desert to the Adar in the south of the country. It remains a transhumance route for domesticated cattle and camels, as well as wild dorcas and dama (Hausa: ménas) gazelles.
