= Tamou Reserve =

Nature reserve in Niger

Réserve totale de faune du Tamou
- IUCN category IV (habitat/species management area)
- Tamou Reserve on a map of WAP complex
- Interactive map of Réserve totale de faune du Tamou
- Location: Tillaberi Region, Niger
- Nearest city: Say, Niger
- Coordinates: 12°35′44″N 2°17′57″E
- Area: 756 km^{2} (292 sq mi)
- Established: 1 January 1962
- Governing body: Parcs Nationaux & Reserves - Niger

The Tamou Total Reserve is a nature reserve in the southwest of Niger. It is a Total Faunal Reserve IUCN type IV, covering some 756 km^{2} (292 sq mi) within the Tillaberi Region. The reserve abuts W du Niger, and is primarily dedicated to the protection of African elephant populations which migrate through the region.
