= Aïr and Ténéré Addax Sanctuary =

Nature reserve in Niger

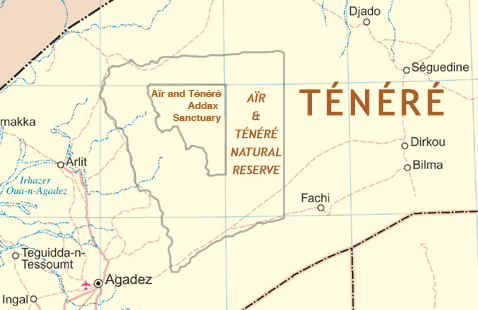
- 300
- Interactive map of Aïr and Ténéré Addax Sanctuary
- Location: Agadez Region, Niger
- Nearest city: Fachi, Agadez
- Coordinates: 19°29′4″N 9°30′13″E
- Area: 12,800 km^{2} (4,900 sq mi)
- Established: 1 January 1988
- Governing body: Parcs Nationaux & Reserves - Niger, UNESCO
- World Heritage site: 573

The Aïr and Ténéré Addax Sanctuary is a nature reserve in the north center of the nation of Niger. The reserve forms part of the larger Aïr and Ténéré National Nature Reserve, which is a UNESCO World Heritage Site. The Aïr and Ténéré National Nature Reserve covers 77,360 square kilometres (29,870 sq mi), of which 12,800 square kilometres (4,900 sq mi) form the Aïr and Ténéré Addax Sanctuary.

The Sanctuary exists to protect the critically endangered Addax, which once roamed much of the Aïr Mountains and Ténéré desert. Established 1 January 1988, the sanctuary IUCN type Ia Strict Nature Reserve, the most restricted faunal reserve in Niger.

Plans in the early 1990s to reintroduce captive bred Addax into the sanctuary were derailed by the advent of the 1990s Tuareg insurgency, while reimplementation has been stopped by fighting which erupted in 2007. As of 2006, it was feared that whatever Addax population remained in the sanctuary was no longer self-sustaining.

== See also ==
- Addax nasomaculatus
- Aïr and Ténéré National Nature Reserve
