= Aïr and Ténéré National Nature Reserve =

National nature reserve in Niger

Aïr and Ténéré Natural Reserves
UNESCO World Heritage Site
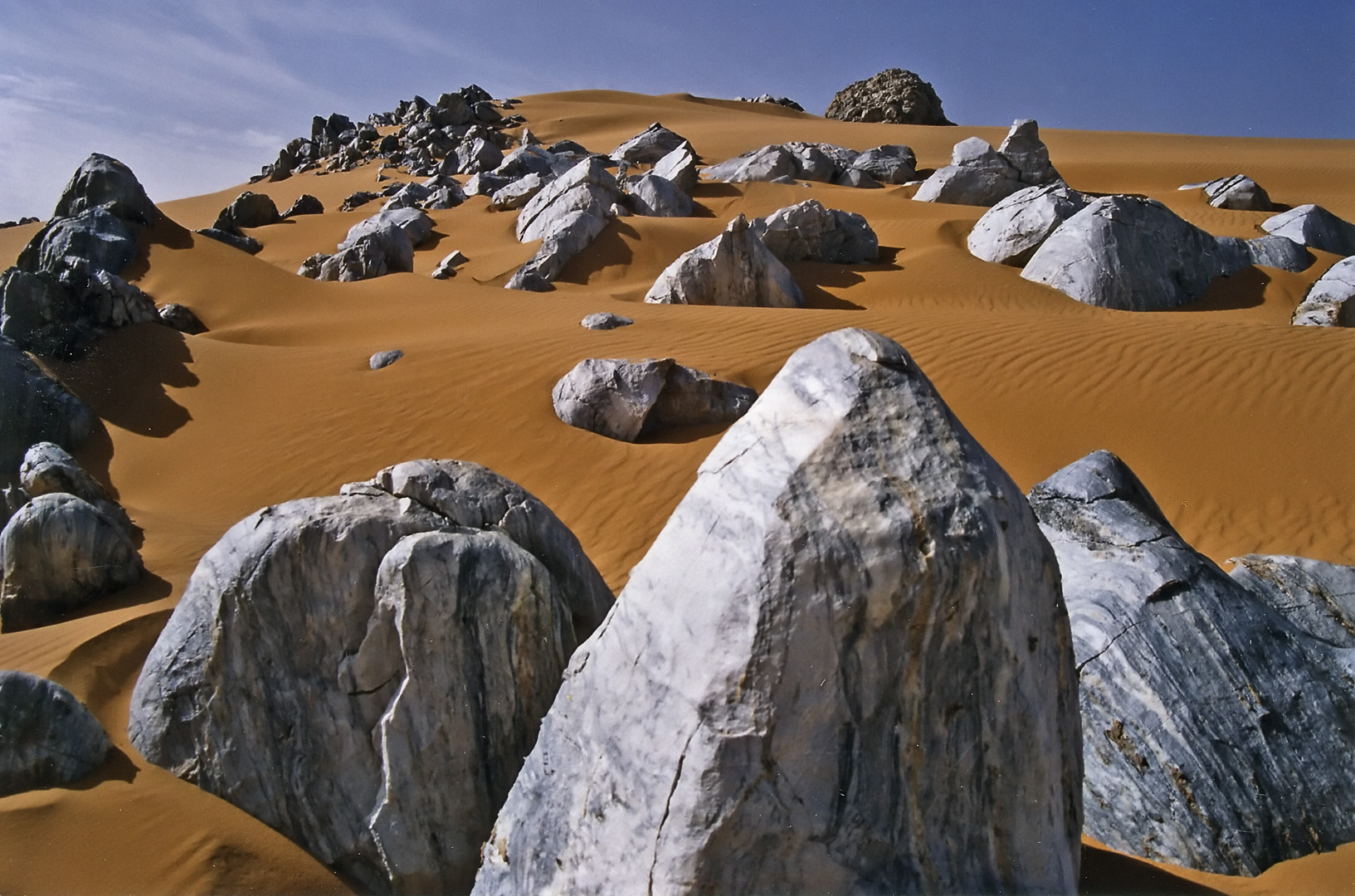
- 'Montagnes bleus' in Aïr

- Location within Niger
- Location: Aïr Mountains, Ténéré, Arlit Department, Niger
- Includes: Aïr and Ténéré National Nature Reserve; Aïr and Ténéré Addax Sanctuary
- Criteria: Natural: (vii), (ix), (x)
- Reference: 573
- Inscription: 1991 (15th Session)
- Endangered: 1992 –
- Area: 7,736,000 ha (29,870 sq mi)
- Website: http://www.cons-dev.org/consdev/niger/PARCAIR/ParcAir.html
- Coordinates: 18°N 9°E

The Aïr and Ténéré National Nature Reserve (French: Réserves naturelles de l'Aïr et du Ténéré) is a national nature reserve in Niger. It includes several overlapping reserve designations, and is designated a UNESCO World Heritage Site. It covers both the eastern half of the Aïr Mountains and the western sections of the Ténéré desert.

It has been identified by BirdLife International as an Important Bird Area. The mountains are an important spot for afrotropical and palaearctic migratory birds.

The Aïr and Ténéré Natural Reserves UNESCO World Heritage Site was established in 1991, and designated as a site in danger in 1992. It was designated under criteria vii, ix, x, and is designated #573. The entire reserve covers 77,360 square kilometres (29,870 sq mi), which made it the second largest nature reserve in Africa, and the fourth largest in the world.

UNESCO's Aïr and Ténéré Natural Reserves include two parts:

Aïr and Ténéré National Nature Reserve
IUCN type IV
Established 1 January 1988
64,560 km²
Aïr and Ténéré Addax Sanctuary
Strict Nature Reserve IUCN type Ia
Established 1 January 1988
12,800 km²

In 2023, UNESCO reported that the reserve was under threat due to civil unrest and mining. Though illegal activities continue to threaten the reserve, local involvement has helped control gold panning.

The 2023 UNESCO report told of four ecological missions. These missions confirmed Dama and Dorcas gazelles and Barbary sheep were still present on the reserve. The addax has not been sighted in 20 years. As for birds, 50 species have been observed with the number of Nubian bustards showing a sharp descrease. In contrast, 165 species of birds were observed in the initial UNESCO listing. The declining biodiversity in the reserve is one of the reasons it is listed on the World Heritage in Danger list due to the flagship species significance in the "outstanding universal value" of the site.

== Geography ==
Aïr is, geographically speaking, an island of Sahelian-type fauna and flora, isolated in a Saharan desert environment. It therefore constitutes a set of exceptional relict ecosystems combined with mountain and plain landscapes of exceptional interest and aesthetic value, justifying its inclusion on the UNESCO world heritage list.

The living dunes of the Ténéré quickly modify the landscape by displacement and deposition of sand. The region contains mountains of blue marble presenting a unique aesthetic interest in this environment.

== Fauna ==
The reserve includes natural habitats important for the survival of three threatened species: the dorcas gazelle, the rhim gazelle, and the addax.

In total, 40 species of mammals, 165 species of birds, 18 species of reptiles and one amphibian species have been identified in the reserve.
