= W National Park =

National park in West Africa

W Transborder Park
- IUCN category II (national park)
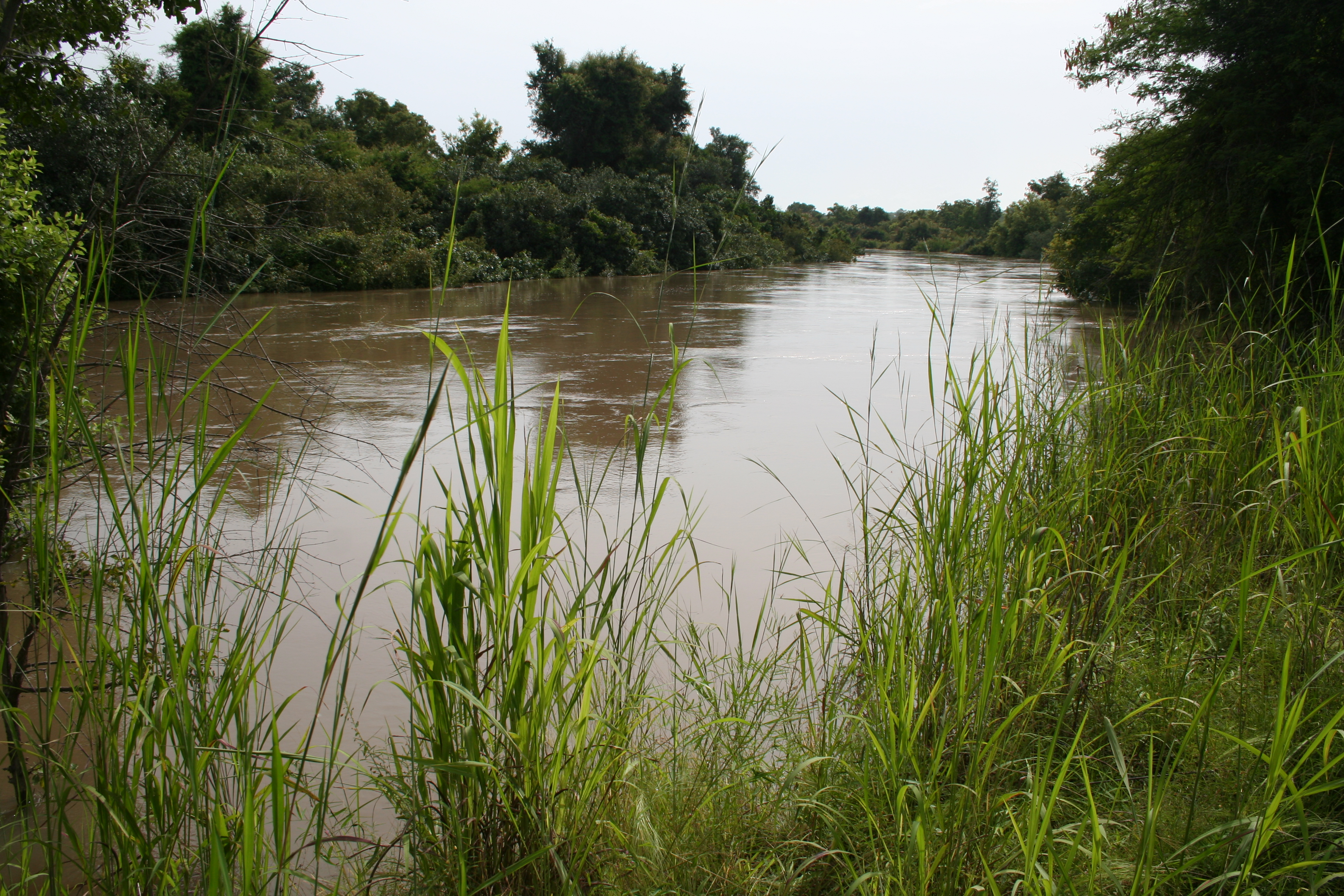
- Mékrou River in the W-National Park

- IUCN Protected Areas of the WAP complex
- Location: Niger-Burkina Faso-Benin
- Nearest city: Kandi (Benin), Diapaga (Burkina Faso), Tapoa (Niger)
- Coordinates: 12°31′31″N 2°39′48″E
- Area: 10,000 km^{2} (3,900 sq mi)
- Established: August 4, 1954
- Governing body: ECOPAS, Governments of Niger, Burkina Faso, and Benin

UNESCO World Heritage Site
- Official name: W Regional Park
- Type: Natural
- Criteria: vii, ix, x
- Designated: 1996 (20th session)
- Reference no.: 749bis
- Region: Africa

Ramsar Wetland
- Official name: Parc national du W
- Designated: 30 April 1987
- Reference no.: 355

Ramsar Wetland
- Official name: Parc National du W
- Designated: 27 June 1990
- Reference no.: 492

Ramsar Wetland
- Official name: Site Ramsar du Complexe W
- Designated: 2 February 2007
- Reference no.: 1668

The W National Park (French: Parc national du W) or W Regional Park (French: W du Niger) is a major national park in West Africa around a meander in the Niger River shaped like the letter W (French: double v). The park includes areas of the three countries Niger, Benin and Burkina Faso, and is governed by the three governments. Until 2008, the implementation of a regional management was supported by the EU-funded project ECOPAS (Protected Ecosystems in Sudano-Sahelian Africa, French: Écosystèmes protégés en Afrique soudano-sahélienne). The three national parks operate under the name W Transborder Park (French: Parc régional W). The section of W National Park lying in Benin, measuring over 8,000 km^{2} (3,100 sq mi), came under the full management of African Parks in June 2020. In Benin, W National Park is contiguous with Pendjari National Park which is also under the management of African Parks.

== History ==
The W National Park of Niger was created by decree on 4 August 1954, and since 1996 has been listed as a UNESCO World Heritage Site. Within Niger, the Park is listed as a National Park, IUCN Type II, and is part of a larger complex of Reserves and protected areas. These include the adjacent Dallol Bosso (Wetlands of International Importance (Ramsar) on the eastern bank of the Niger River and the partial overlap of the smaller "Parc national du W" (Wetlands of International Importance (Ramsar)). The three parks are BirdLife International Important Bird Areas (IBAs) of types A1 and A3 (IBA codes IBA NE001, IBA BF008, and IBA BJ001).

=== Violence ===
On 8 February 2022, two African Parks patrol vehicles in Benin's portion of the W National Park ran over land mines suspected to be planted by Islamic terrorists, killing eight people.

On 25–26 July 2024, five Beninese park rangers and seven soldiers were killed in a gun attack inside the park.

On 17 April 2025, 54 Beninese soldiers were killed in an attack inside the park that was claimed by Jama'at Nasr al-Islam wal-Muslimin.

== Geography ==
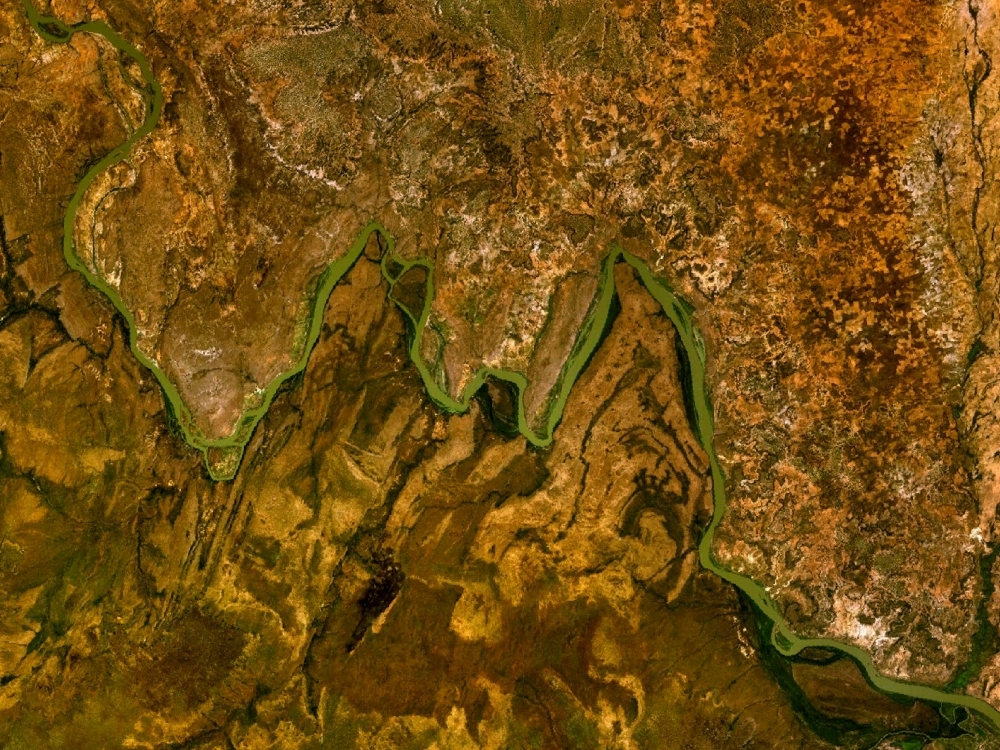
Bends in the River Niger which give W National Park its distinctive name

In the three nations, the regional park covers some 10,000 km^{2} (3,900 sq mi) largely uninhabited by humans, having been until the 1970s a malarial zone of wetlands formed by the delta of the Mékrou River with the Niger, broken by rocky hills. Historically, the area has been at one time a major area of human habitation, judged by the important archaeological sites (mostly tombs) found in the area.

== Flora ==
A total of 454 species of plants were recorded in the park, including two orchids found only in Niger. The park also constitutes the southern limit of tiger bush plateaus distribution in Niger.

== Fauna ==
The park is known for its large mammals, including aardvark, baboon, African buffalo, caracal, cheetah, African bush elephant, hippopotamus, African leopard, West African lion, serval and warthog. The park provides a home for some of West Africa's last wild African elephants. However, the rare West African giraffe, today restricted to small parts of the Niger, is absent from the area. The W park is also known for historic occurrence of packs of the endangered West African wild dog, although this canid may now be locally extinct.

The park is one of the last strongholds for the Northwest African cheetah. A small population of 25 individuals is estimated to be resident across the W–Arli–Pendjari protected area complex.

The W National Park is also known for its bird populations, especially transitory migrating species, with over 350 species identified in the park. The park has been identified by BirdLife International as an Important Bird Area.

== Gallery ==
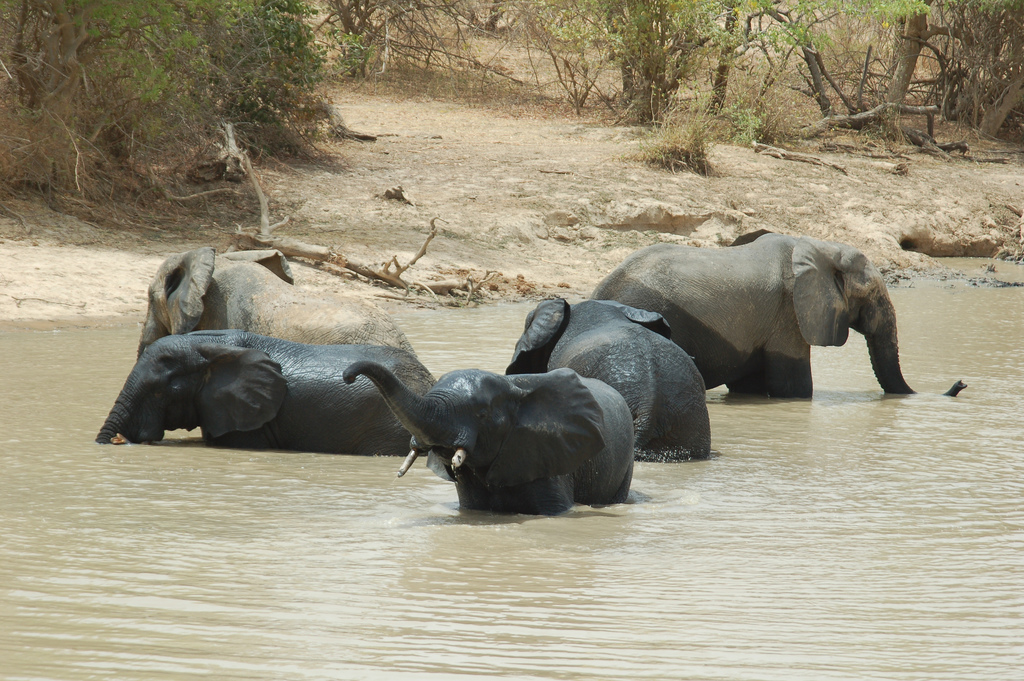
Bush elephants

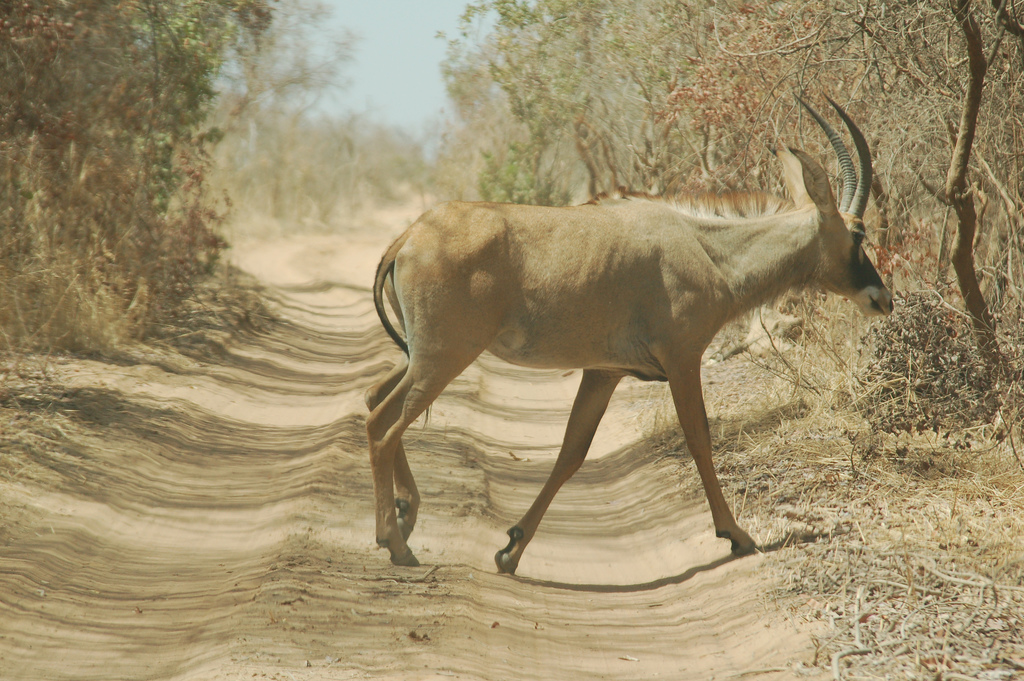
Roan antelope

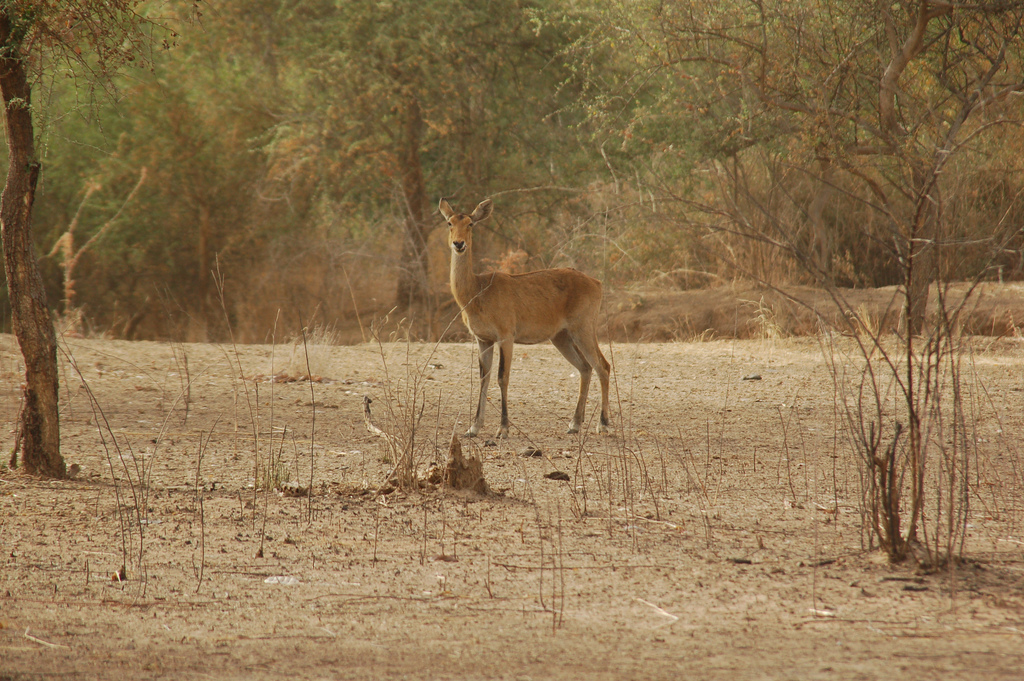
Kob antelope

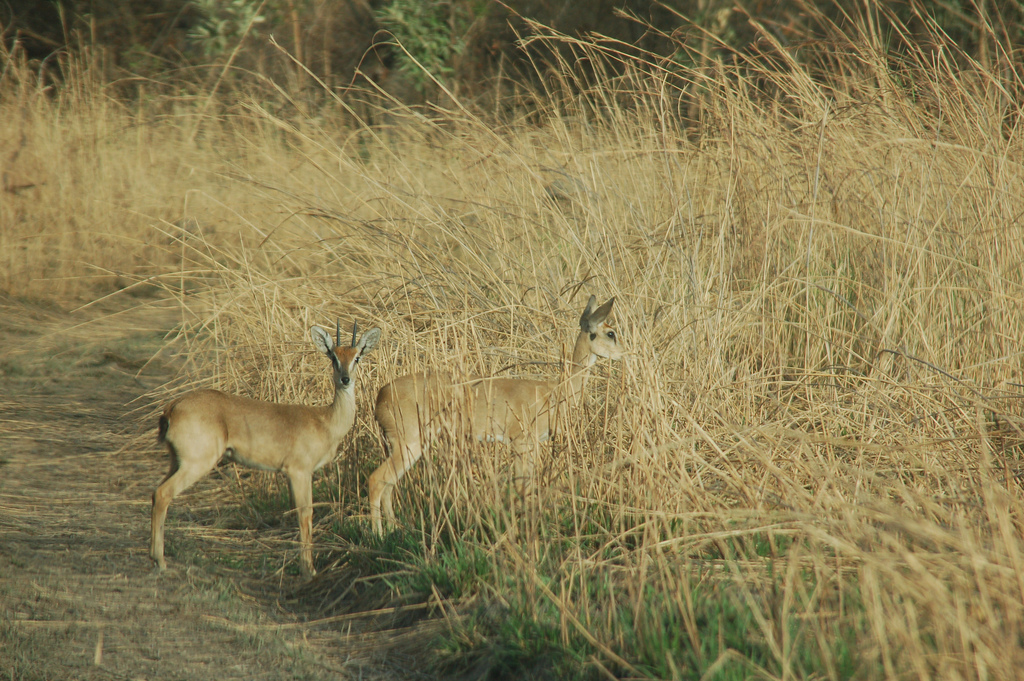
Oribis

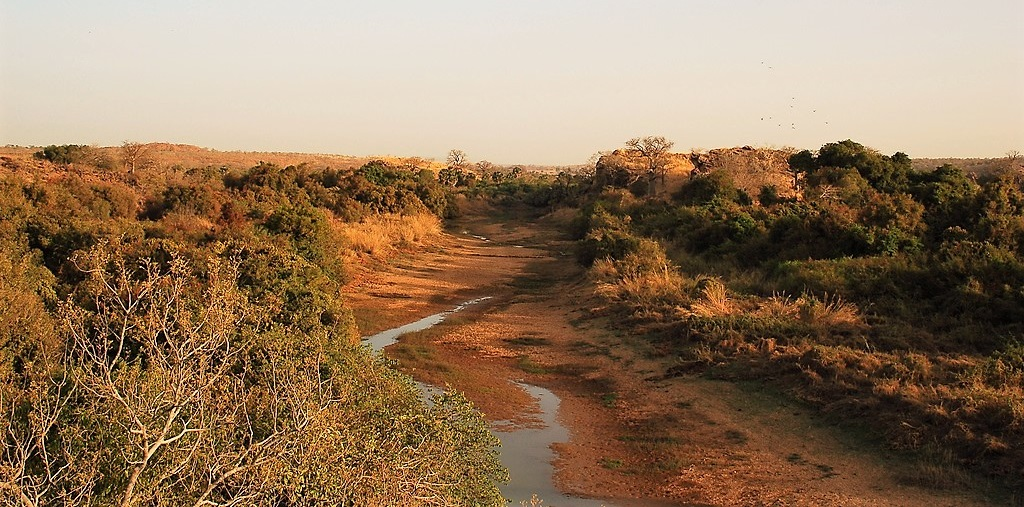
Landscape

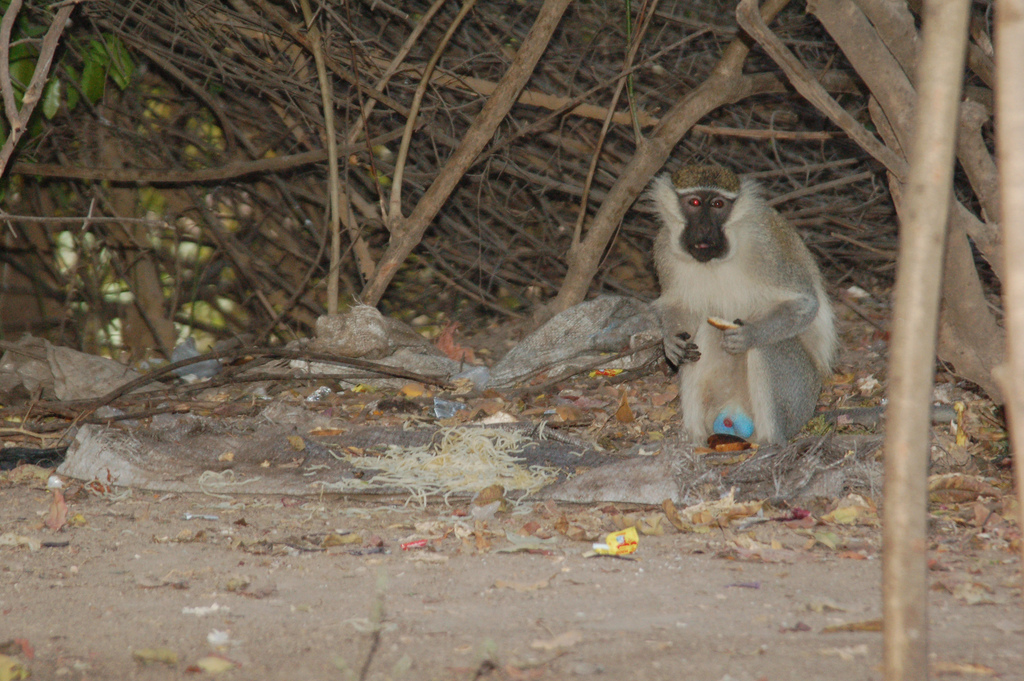
Tantalus monkey

== See also ==
- Pendjari National Park

== Literature ==
- Convers Arnaud, Chaibou Issa, Binot Aurélie, Dulieu Dominique (2007) La gestion de la transhumance dans la zone d’influence du parc régional du w par le programme ecopas: une « approche projet » pour l’aménagement de la périphérie du parc. Vertigo Hors Série 4. URL : http://vertigo.revues.org/761; DOI : 10.4000/vertigo.761
- Benoit M (1998) Statut et usage du sol en périphérie du parc national du "W" du Niger. Tome 1 : Contribution à l’étude du milieu naturel et des ressources végétales du canton de Tamou et du Parc du "W". ORSTOM, Niamey, Niger, 41 p.
- Doussa S (2004) Les impacts de la culture cotonnière sur la gestion des ressources naturelles du Parc W. Maitrise, Université de Ouagadougou.
- Grégoire JM, Fournier A, Eva H & Sawadogo L (2003) Caractérisation de la dynamique des feux et de l’évolution du couvert dans le Parc du W: Burkina Faso, Bénin et Niger. 64 S.
- Hogan C.Michael (2009) Painted Hunting Dog: Lycaon pictus, GlobalTwitcher.com, ed. N. Stromberg
- Koster S, Grettenberger J (1983). "A preliminary survey of birds in Park W Niger". Malimbus. 5: 62–72.
- Nacoulma, B.M.I. (2012): Dynamique et stratégies de conservation de la végétation et de la phytodiversité du complexe écologique du Parc National du W du Burkina Faso. PhD thesis, Université de Ouagadougou.
- Nacoulma, B.M.I., Schmidt, M., Hahn, K., Thiombiano, A. (2020): A checklist of vascular plants of the W National Park in Burkina Faso, including the adjacent hunting zones of Tapoa-Djerma and Kondio. Biodiversity Data Journal 8: e54205.
- Poche R (1976). "A checklist of National Park W, Niger". Africa Mig. Field. 41 (3): 113–115.
- Poche R (1973). "Niger's threatened park 'W'". Oryx. 12 (2): 216–222. doi:10.1017/s003060530001156x.
- Rabeil T (2003) Distribution potentielles des grands mammifères dans le Parc du W au Niger. Doctoral Thesis, Univ. Paris VII. 463 S.
- Price et al. (2003) The “W” Regional Park of Benin, Burkina Faso and Niger - Building on a Process of Regional Integration to Address both Local Interests and Transboundary Challenges. World Parks Congress 2003, Durban, RSA. In: Pansky, Diane (ed.). 2005. Governance Stream of the Vth World Parks Congress. Ottawa, Canada: Parks Canada and IUCN/WCPA. ISBN R62-375/2003E-MRC 0-662-40433-5.
- W National Park of Niger. 2009.
- Zwarg A, Schmidt M, Janßen T, Hahn K, Zizka G (2012) Plant diversity, functional traits and soil conditions of grass savannas on lateritic crusts (bowé) in south eastern Burkina Faso. Flora et Vegetatio Sudano-Sambesica 15: 15–24.
