= African Wildlife Foundation =

International conservation organization

- Formation: 1961
- Type: INGO
- Purpose: Wildlife conservation
- Headquarters: Nairobi, Kenya
- Region served: Africa
- Chief Executive Officer: Kaddu Sebunya
- Budget: US$27,709,524 (2016)
- Staff: 132
- Website: www.awf.org
- Formerly called: African Wildlife Leadership Foundation

The African Wildlife Foundation (AWF) is an international conservation organization created with the intent of preserving Africa's wildlife, wild lands, and natural resources. Founded in 1961, the organization helped establish conservation programs at the College of African Wildlife Management, Mweka in Tanzania, and the Ecole de Faune de Garoua in Cameroon. The Foundation works with governments and businesses to develop conservation efforts as a source of revenue.

== Early years ==
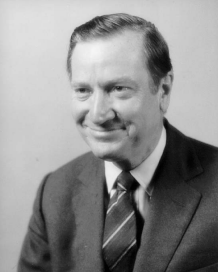
Russell Train, founder of the AWF

The African Wildlife Leadership Foundation (AWLF) was founded in 1961 by Russell E. Train, a wealthy judge, hunter, and member of the Washington Safari Club. Other founding members of the Safari Club were Nick Arundel, a former United States Marine Corps combat officer and journalist; Kermit Roosevelt Jr. of the Central Intelligence Agency; James S. Bugg, a businessman; and Maurice Stans, an accountant who would later serve as finance chairman of the Richard Nixon administration.

Train was worried that European park managers would be replaced by unqualified Africans in conservation works as African countries gained their independence. Twenty African countries became independent in 1960 and 1961. Train wrote, "In Tanganyika alone, the government recently ordered Hundred percent (100%) Africanization of the game service by 1966! The replacement of European staff by untrained, unqualified men spells disaster for the game."

The first major grant of the AWLF was $47,000 to help found the College of African Wildlife Management at Mweka, Tanzania, in 1963. The college was organized by Bruce Kinloch, Chief Game Warden of Tanganyika, as a pioneer institution for the training of African wildlife managers. Funding for Mweka was also provided by the U.S. Agency for International Development and the Frankfurt Zoological Society, with facilities donated by the government of Tanganyika. By 2010, the college had trained over 4,500 wildlife managers from 28 African countries and 18 non-African countries.

In 1963, AWLF started a scholarship program to bring young Africans to American universities where they could study biology and wildlife management. Later that year, AWLF built a conservation education center at the entrance to Nairobi National Park. In 1967, the AWLF provided $50,000 to finance the construction of a research institute in Tanzania. In 1970, the AWF established a school for wildlife management in Garoua, Cameroon; giving instruction in French. During the 1970s and 1980s, the AWLF continued to finance students, and also assisted conservation projects, often giving supplies such as tents, vehicle spare parts, water pumps, and photographic equipment, rather than cash.

In 1969, the AWLF took the lead in a campaign supported by other conservation groups to protect rhinoceroses. In 1974, the foundation began a program to study cheetahs. In 1983, the AWF dropped "Leadership" from its name. Train was disappointed with the change, believing that the organization had lost sight of its original mandate. In his view, it had become just another conservation organization, giving funding to westerners to conduct research on animals. There is research such as Dian Fossey's work on gorillas and Cynthia Moss's work on elephants, which were both supported by the AWF.

In 1968, the annual budget was less than US$250,000. In 1988, the year of the AWF's campaign launch against elephant poaching, the foundation had a staff of six and an annual budget of $2 million. When the AWF turned 30 in 1991, the board of trustees remained dominated by prominent and wealthy Americans, many of whom served on other non-profit boards.

== Recent initiatives ==
The AWF have said their recent programs are modelled around three central objectives: empowering people, conserving wildlife, and protecting land. Empowering people involves conservation enterprises.

The AWF's primary goal is to protect land. Starting in 1998, land protection efforts focused on landscape-level conservation approaches.

Foundation finances include a reported income of US$19,333,998 in the 2009 fiscal year. Of this, $8,582,555 came from public sector support, $5,815,839 from corporate and foundation support, $5,224,931 from gifts from individuals, and $1,360,424 from legacy gifts. $17,395,456 was spent on programs, $1,524,764 on fund raising, and $1,262,056 in administration. Program funding broke down as $14,174,224 on conservation programs, $2,392,989 on public education, and $828,243 on membership programs.

== Priority landscapes ==
The AWF formerly referred to its protected landscapes as its "heartlands"; currently, the organization employs a "priority landscape" approach. These priority landscapes include:

Countries	Priority landscape	Start	Notes
Democratic Republic of the Congo (DRC)	Congo	2003	Moist tropical forest between the Lopori and Maringa Rivers. Home of the endangered bonobo
Botswana, Zambia, and Zimbabwe	Kazungula	2001	Woodland-grassland mosaic with important wildlife migration corridors around the Zambezi River
Kenya & Tanzania	Kilimanjaro	1999	Wetlands and savanna surrounding Mount Kilimanjaro
Mozambique, South Africa, and Zimbabwe	Limpopo	2002	Savannahs, woodlands, rivers and floodplains around the Limpopo River
Tanzania	Maasai Steppe	1999	Savannah including Lake Manyara and Tarangire National Park
Niger, Burkina Faso, and Benin	Parc W	2010	Protected savanna in West Africa.
Kenya	Samburu	1999	Acacia grassland near to Mount Kenya
Congo, Rwanda and Uganda	Virunga	1999	Volcanic highland mountains, home of the last 700 mountain gorillas in the world
Mozambique, Zambia and Zimbabwe	Zambezi	2000	Zambezi River, tributaries, acacia floodplain and interconnecting wetlands
Democratic Republic of the Congo (DRC)	Bili Uele	2013	Savanna mosaic north of the Uele River and lowland primary forest to the south. Home of the chimpanzee and forest elephant
Namibia	Etosha-Skeleton Coast	2013	Vast salt pan, woodland, and savanna ecosystems
South Africa	Great Fish River	2013	A 45,000-hectare reserve in the Great Fish River valley, home to increasingly vulnerable population of critically endangered black rhino
Zimbabwe	Save Valley		Save Valley Conservancy, home to endangered rhinos
Cameroon	Faro	2012	In addition to hosting the largest population of hippos in Cameroon, Faro National Park is home to elephants, black rhinos, cheetahs, hyenas, and other wildlife
Kenya	Mau Forest	2011	The Mau Forest Complex sits within Kenya's Rift Valley and is the largest indigenous montane forest in East Africa
Tanzania	Ruaha	2012	The Ruaha area will intersect with an agriculture corridor that the Tanzanian government wants to develop in southern Tanzania

=== Bili-Uele ===
The Bili-Uele Protected Area Complex is found in the remote north of the Democratic Republic of the Congo, along the border of the Central African Republic. The region consists of savanna mosaic north of the Uele River and lowland primary forest to the south. Both regions support the remaining undisturbed population of the eastern chimpanzee. An estimated 35,000–65,000 eastern chimpanzees are found in this complex. Few organizations are working there.

=== Congo ===
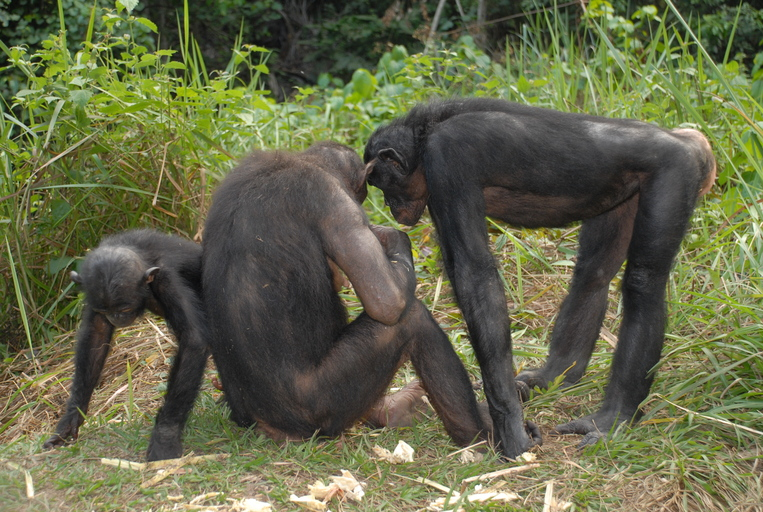
Group of bonobos

The Maringa-Lopori-Wamba Landscape in the Democratic Republic of the Congo is one of the least developed and most remote parts of the Congo Basin. The inhabitants are among the poorest in Africa. Most people live by slash-and-burn agriculture and rely on bushmeat protein. Cash crops include maize, cassava and groundnuts. The growing population risks a revival of logging.

Since 1973, a Japanese team has been researching the bonobo population near the village of Wamba in 1973. However, research was discontinued after political disorders started in 1991, followed by the civil war in 1997, resuming only in the mid-2000s. The IUCN Red List classifies bonobos as an endangered species, with conservative population estimates ranging from 29,500 to 50,000 individuals. The AWF has partnered with local and international groups to develop a sustainable land use plan for the MLW Landscape. The plan aims to ensure that the economic and cultural needs of the inhabitants are met while conserving the environment. The approach combines AWF's Landscape Conservation Process and the Central African Regional Program for the Environment (CARPE) Program Monitoring Plan. A variety of tools are used, including surveys, interviews with local people, and satellite image interpretation.

=== Etosha-Skeleton Coast ===
The Etosha-Skeleton Coast landscape, in the northern part of Namibia, is home to Etosha National Park and its vast salt pan, woodland, and savanna ecosystems. The landscape is home to the black-faced impala and the oryx. To the west of the park lies the Skeleton Coast, where herds of elephants live. The African Wildlife Foundation is scaling up social venture capital investments through its subsidiary, African Wildlife Capital (AWC), which invests in the Grootberg Lodge in the Khoadi-Hoas community conservancy.

=== Faro ===
At the core of the Faro landscape in northern Cameroon is Faro National Park, located close to the Nigerian border. This park hosts the largest population of hippos in Cameroon. AWF is lending support to counter-poaching park rangers in Faro and building a contingent of community scouts on the park's borders to provide a buffer between outsiders and the park.

=== Great Fish River ===
The Great Fish River Nature Reserve is located in South Africa's Eastern Cape province. The 45,000-hectare reserve, which lies in the Great Fish River valley, is home to critically endangered black rhinos.

=== Kazungula ===
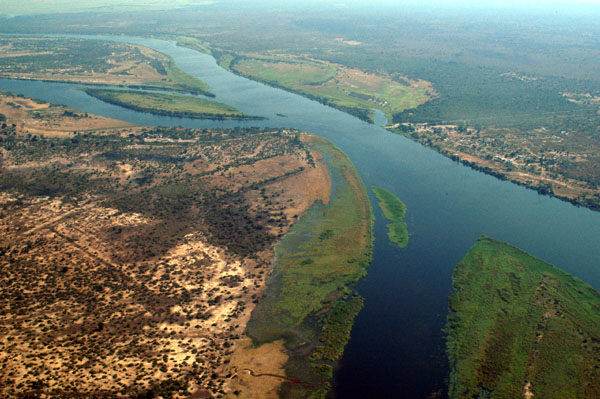
Aerial photo of Kazungula (centre right) on the Zambezi River

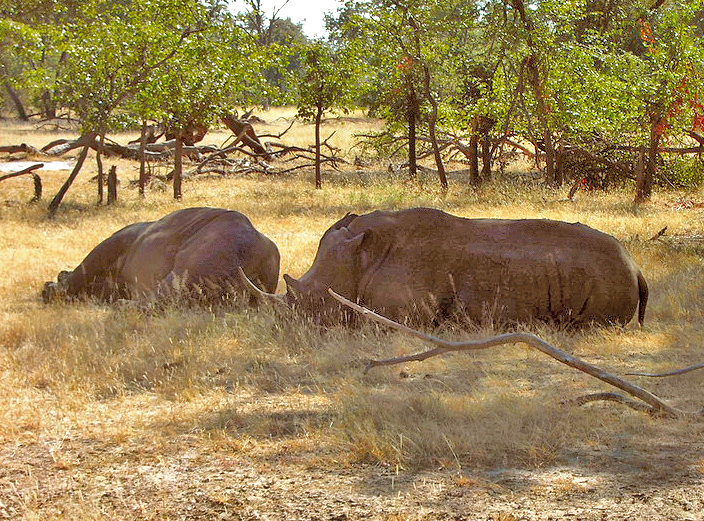
The two white rhinos at Mosi-oa-Tunya National Park in May 2005

The floodplains of the Zambezi River are surrounded by a mosaic of miombo and mopane woodlands and grasslands that include important wildlife migration corridors. Victoria Falls, the largest in the world, are between Mosi-oa-Tunya National Park in Zambia and Victoria Falls National Park in Zimbabwe. The Falls and surrounding area are designated a World Heritage Site. However, the environment is threatened by the development of tourism and a lack of funding.

The AWF has established the 160,000 acres (65,000 ha) Sekute Conservation Area in this region in partnership with the Sekute Chiefdom, holding two elephant corridors' helped wildlife authorities settle four new white rhinos in Mosi-oa-Tunya National Park in Zambia, joining the last surviving white rhino in the country, a bull. On 17 January 2011, it was reported that two of the females white rhinos had given birth to calves, which seemed healthy. The area is also home to endangered black rhinos. In 2011, a cluster of modern new buildings for the Lupani community school were opened in Kazungula, built by the AWF at a cost of US$250,000. The new school has six classrooms, offices and five teachers' houses with three bedrooms each.

=== Kilimanjaro ===
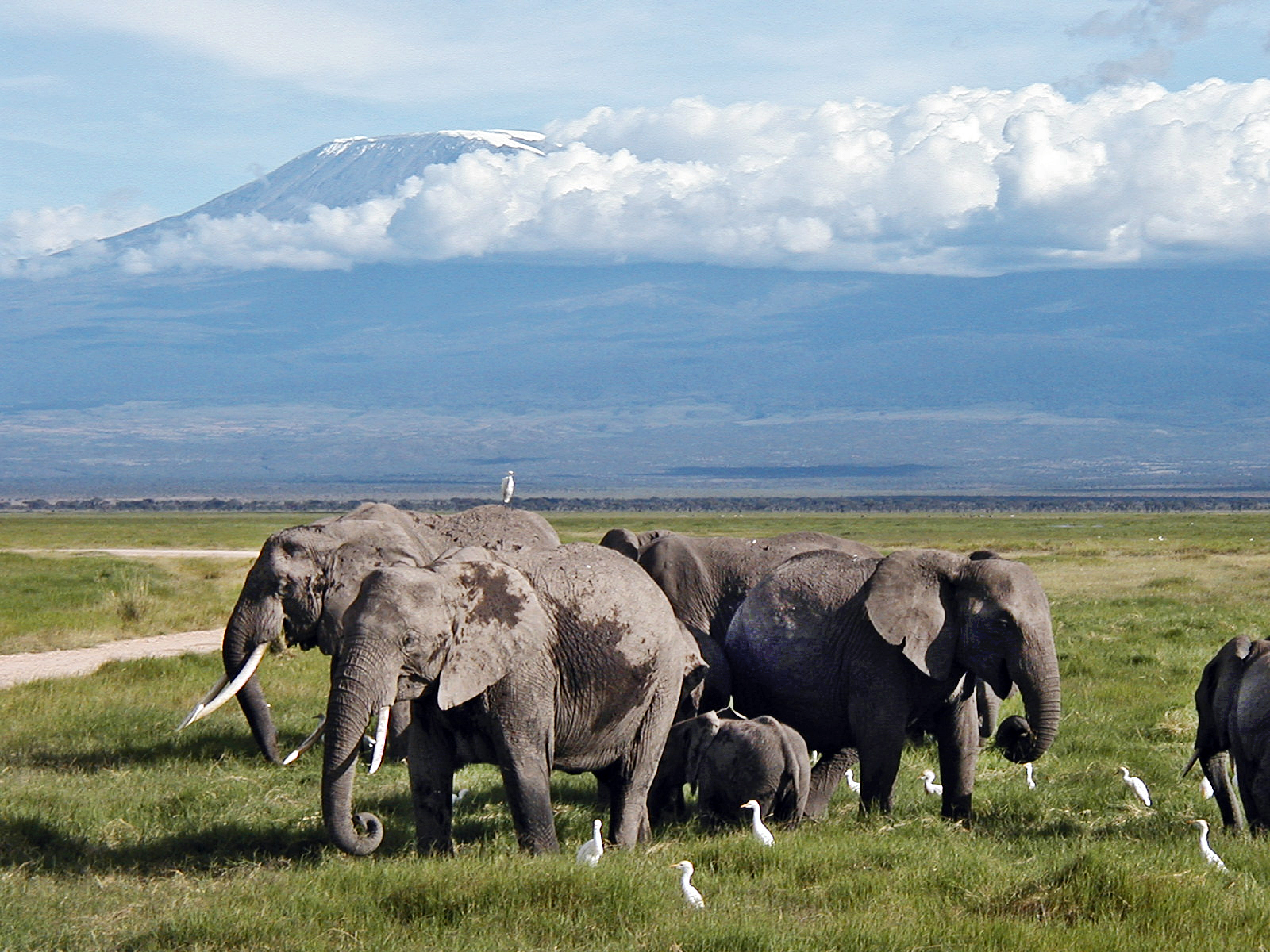
Elephants grazing in the Amboseli swamps, north of Kilimanjaro

Disney released the movie African Cats in April 2011. The Disney Worldwide Conservation Fund gave AWF a portion of the proceeds from the first week's ticket sales for use in protecting the Amboseli Wildlife Corridor. Their "See 'African Cats,' Save the Savanna" program served both to promote the movie and to raise money for conservation.

=== Limpopo ===
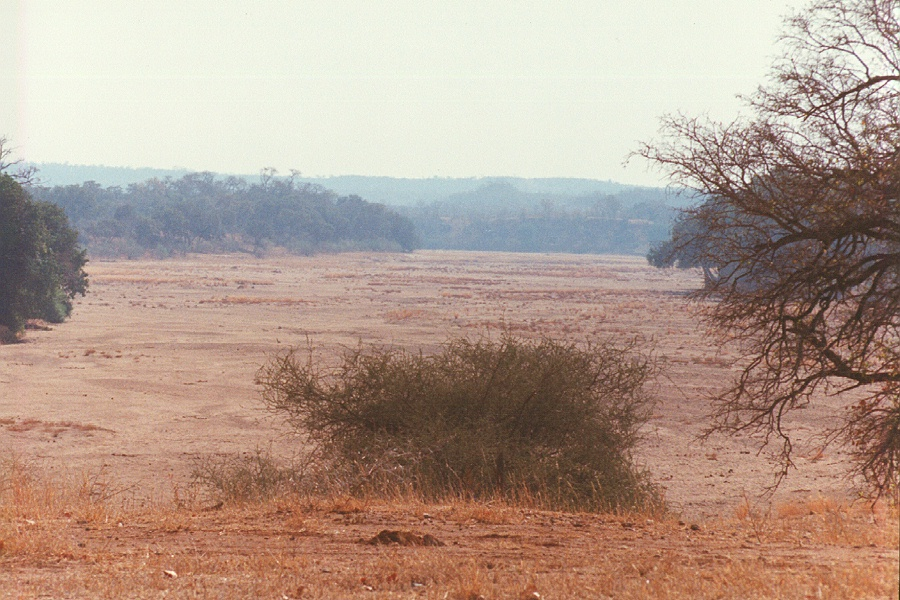
Buffalo Bend on the Mwenezi River, Gonarezhou National Park, Zimbabwe

The Limpopo Landscape includes areas of Mozambique, South Africa and Zimbabwe. It includes savannas, woodlands, rivers and floodplains. Fauna include sable antelope, rhinos, hippos, and many species of birds, insects and aquatic life. The AWF has started the Leopard Conservation Science Project in this landscape. The AWF is particularly involved in the Banhine National Park in Mozambique, which covers 7,000 square kilometres (2,700 sq mi). Until recently, this park had little or no infrastructure or staff to ensure that the environment was protected. The AWF has built a conservation research center, which it is marketed internationally. Fees from researchers will pay for staff to run the center and manage the park.

The Great Limpopo Trans frontier Park (GLTP) is a 35,000 square kilometres (14,000 sq mi) park that is being established to connect the Kruger National Park in South Africa, the Limpopo National Park in Mozambique, the Gonarezhou National Park in Zimbabwe, and other protected areas. It is almost the size of the Netherlands and more than three times larger than Yellowstone National Park. The GLTP is home to many of the species most popular with tourists, including lions, white and black rhinoceros, giraffes, elephants, hippopotamus and buffalos. The AWF says the mega park will result in "creating new jobs and fortifying a tourism base [that is] not yet meeting its full potential". The AWF is a major sponsor of the project that is setting up this park.

=== Maasai Steppe ===
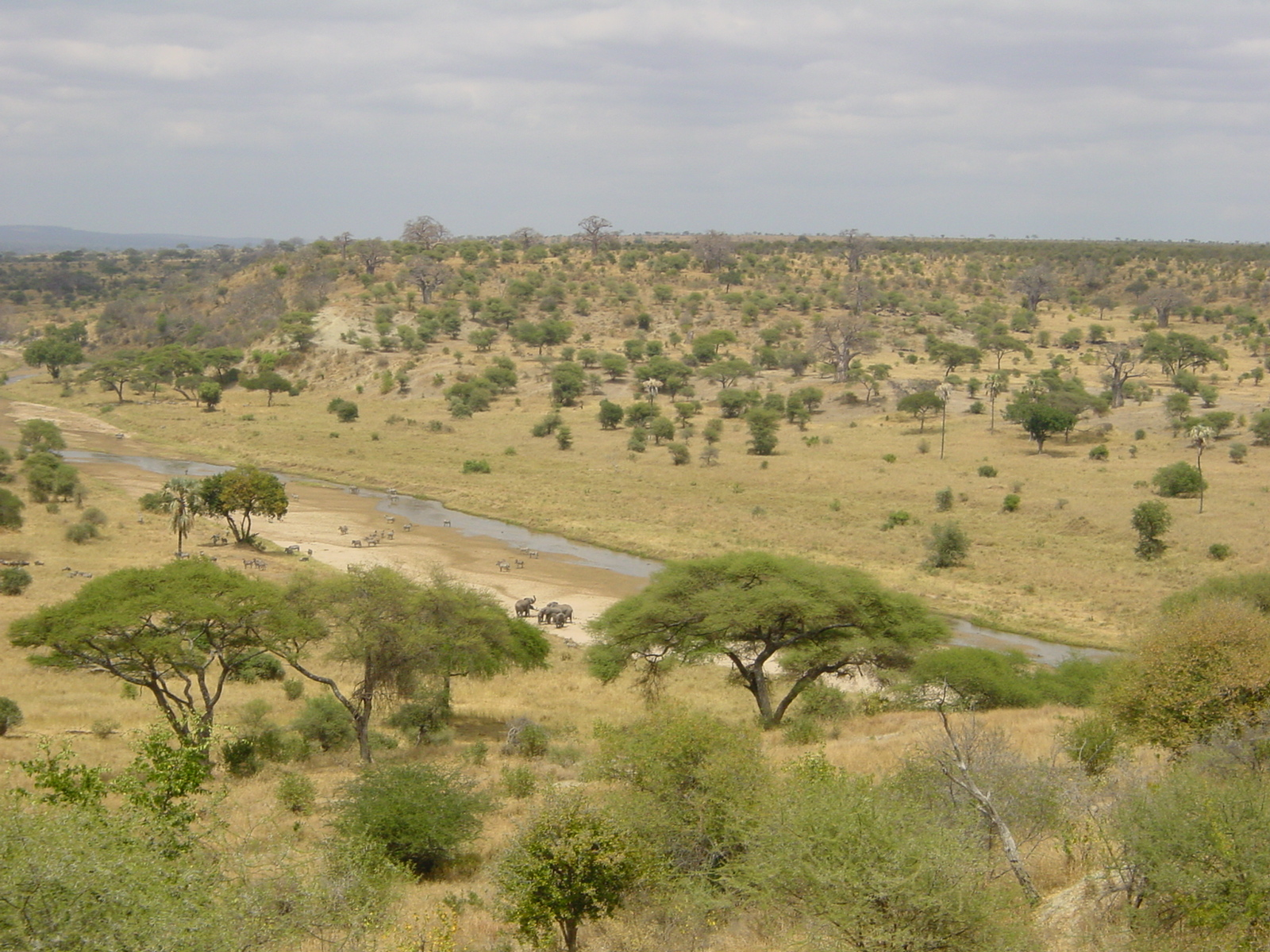
Tarangire National Park in Tanzania, East Africa

The 35,000 acres (14,000 ha) Manyara Ranch Conservancy is near to Lake Manyara in Tanzania. This is a conservation and tourism project supported by the African Wildlife Foundation, the Tanzania Land Conservation Trust and the Manyara Ranch Conservancy. Rarely seen, but a common resident on the Conservancy is the lesser kudu.

=== Mau Forest Complex ===
Within Kenya's Rift Valley, sits the Mau Forest Complex. It is the largest indigenous montane forest in East Africa and serves as a critical water catchment area for the country, providing a source of water for many of Kenya's wildlife and people. African Wildlife Foundation, together with the Kenya Forest Service, the Community Forest Association, and other stakeholders, is reforesting areas of the Mau Forest with indigenous trees.

=== Parc W ===
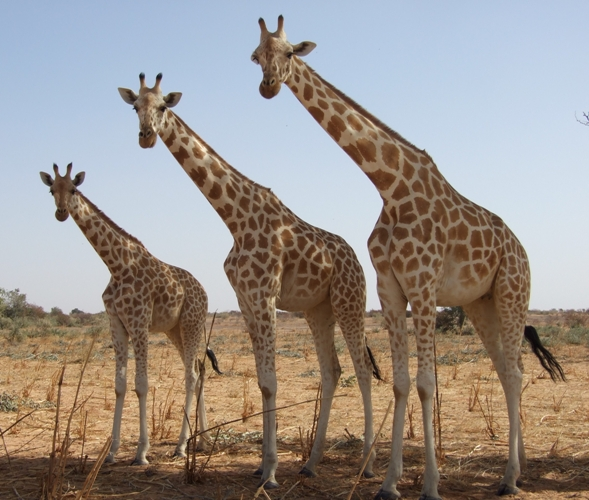
West African giraffes near Kouré, Niger

This 1,823,280 hectares (7,039.7 sq mi) region is located around the point where Niger, Burkina Faso and Benin meet. It consists of three national protected parks that form a UNESCO World Heritage Site, the trans-national W National Park, as well as several adjacent reserves and buffer zones. The complex includes savanna woodlands, gallery forests and flooded plains where the Mekrou and Niver rivers meet. It is home to the largest population of elephants in the region and the only remaining West African giraffes. Mitochondrial and nuclear DNA research shows that this is a subspecies that diverged from the Rothschild's giraffe about 350,000 years ago.

In Parc W, AWF and other International NGOs such as the International Union for Conservation of Nature, World Wide Fund for Nature and Africa 70 play a central role in communication, education and organization of local communities and their leaders, and help collect socio-economic and technical data. AWF is helping fund tree nurseries in Niger and Burkino Faso for replanting to provide fodder for the giraffes. Conservation threats are human population growth and desertification. AWF partners in the region include the Association pour la Sauvegarde des Girafes du Niger, Centre National de Gestion des Réserves de Faune (CENAGREF), Benin and the Ministries of the Environment in Burkina Faso and Niger.

=== Ruaha ===
The Ruaha area will intersect with an agriculture corridor that the Tanzanian government wants to develop in southern Tanzania. The proposed corridor will overlap many different ecosystems. AWF is scaling up social venture capital investments through its subsidiary, African Wildlife Capital (AWC), which invests in socially and environmentally responsible agricultural and other businesses—such as the Rungwe Avocado Co.—that must comply with conservation covenants to secure and maintain investment.

=== Samburu ===
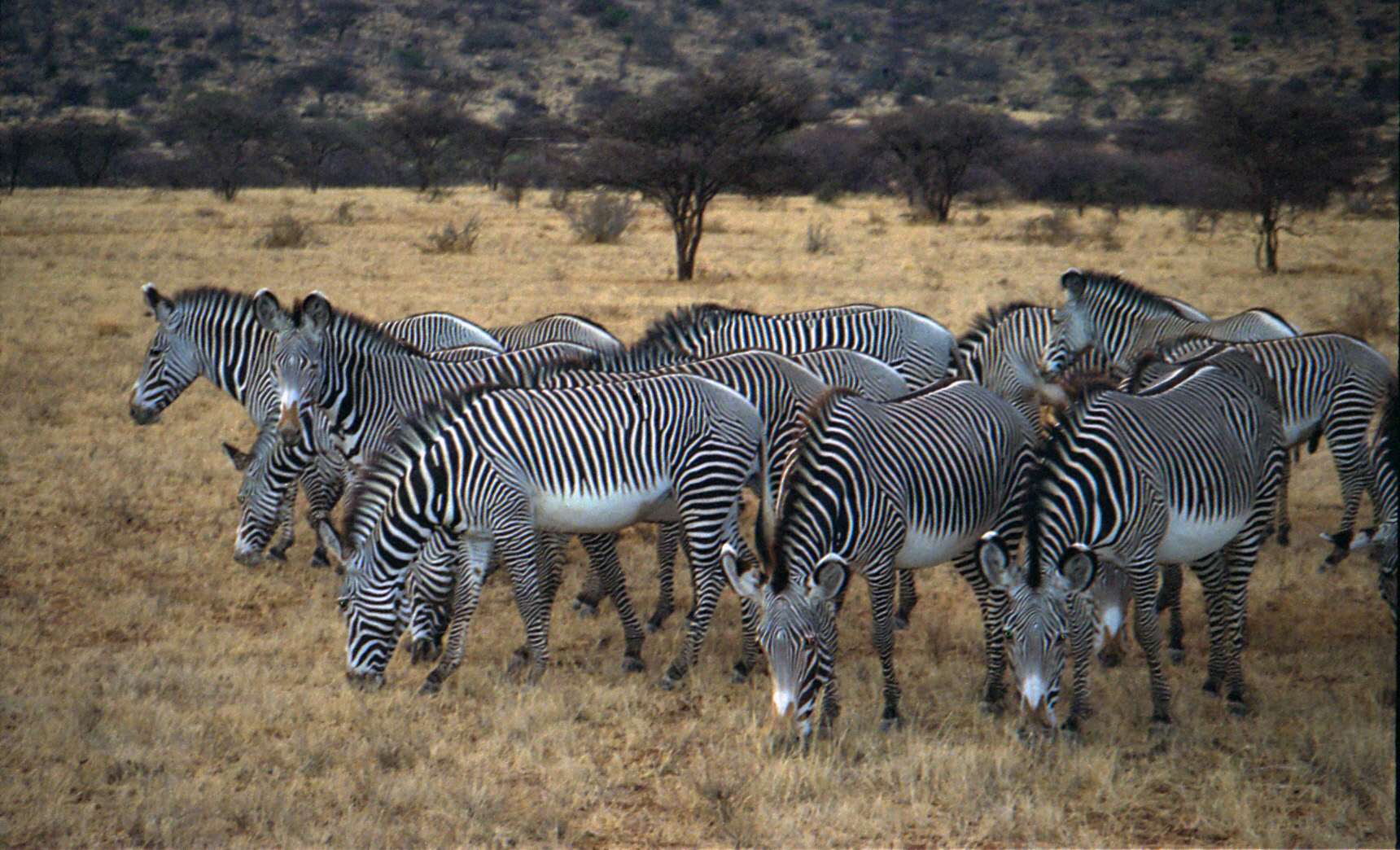
Grevy's zebras in Samburu National Reserve

The Grevy's zebra and reticulated giraffe live in the Samburu Landscape among the acacia grasslands. The challenges faced in Samburu are forest/habitat degradation due to logging and farming and cattle–carnivore conflict.

AWF has addressed these challenges, including partnering with Starbucks Coffee Trading Co. to train coffee growers and working with Samburu warriors.

=== Virunga ===
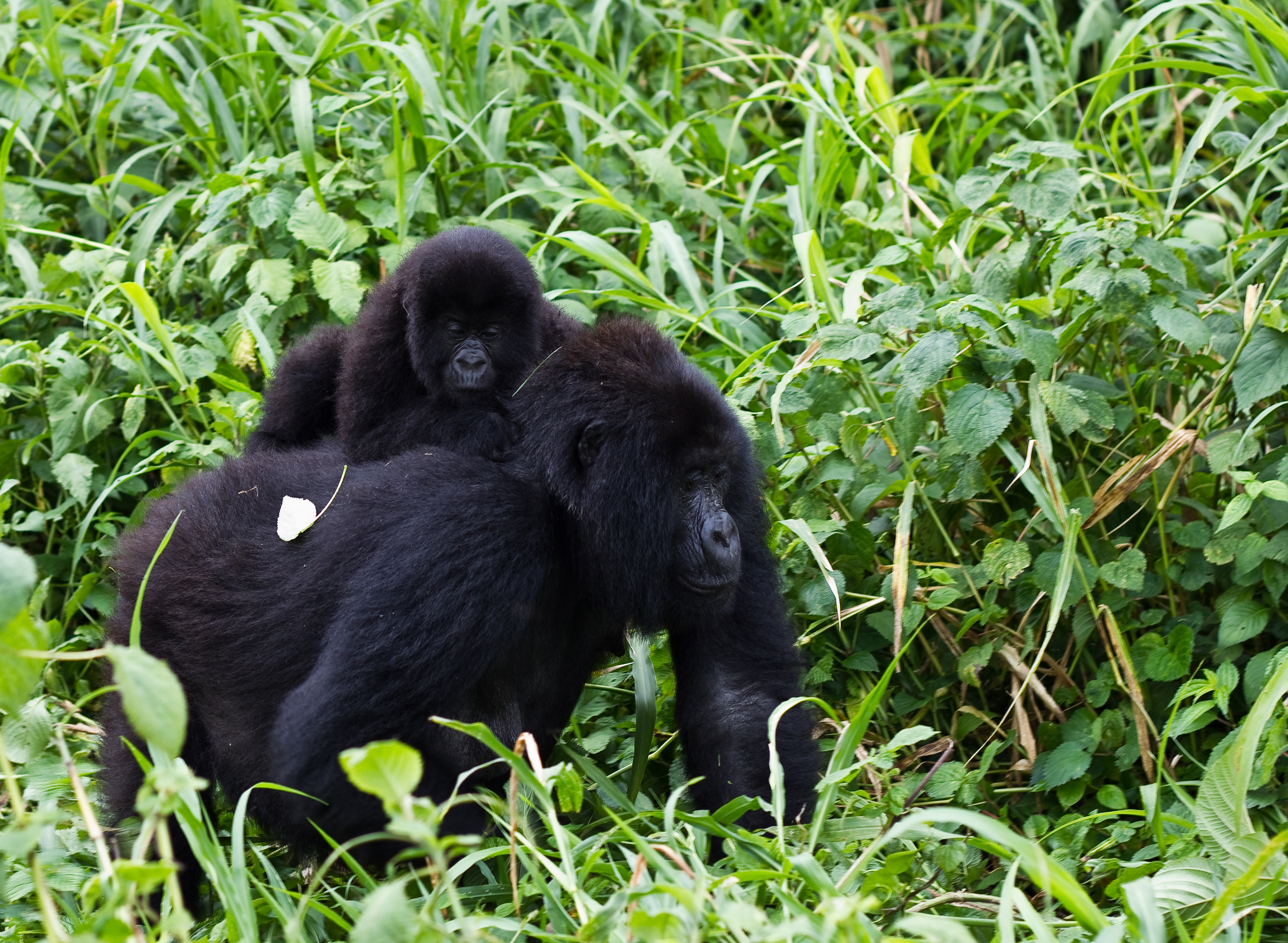
Mountain gorillas in Virunga National Park, Democratic Republic of the Congo

The Virunga landscape is an area of volcanic highlands around the point where Uganda, Rwanda and the Democratic Republic of the Congo meet. Virunga is home to the last 700 mountain gorillas in the world. It includes the Mgahinga Gorilla National Park in Uganda, where AWF opened a visitor center in July 2006. The Virunga ecosystem shelters chimpanzees, golden monkeys, forest elephants, and many species of birds, reptiles and amphibians. The region is overpopulated and unstable.

The AWF helped Dian Fossey study Rwandan mountain gorillas in the 1960s. AWF President Robinson McIlvaine later said that "There would be no mountain gorillas in the Virungas today ... were it not for Dian Fossey's tireless efforts over many years". McIlvaine initiated the formation of a consortium to protect the threatened Rwandan mountain gorillas while he was president of the AWF between 1978 and 1982. More recently, the AWF coordinated fundraising and construction of a lodge overlooking the Bwindi Impenetrable Forest National Park.

According to Farley Mowat in his book Woman in the Mists, in the late 1970s, Fossey asked McIlvaine to temporarily serve as secretary-treasurer of the Digit Fund while he was AWF President. She had created the fund to finance patrols against poachers seeking to kill mountain gorillas. McIlvaine partnered with the International Primate Protection League, the Digit Fund, and his own AWF, asking for funds to be made out to the AWF. The Digit Fund received none of the money. When McIlvaine suggested to Fossey that the Digit Fund could be folded into AWF, Fossey declined, and McIlvaine resigned as secretary-treasurer of the fund.

The AWF is a co-sponsor of the International Gorilla Conservation Program (IGCP) in Virunga, the others being Fauna & Flora International (FFI) and the World Wide Fund for Nature (WWF). Among other activities, the IGCP works with Virunga Artisans, which markets the handmade products of artisans who live near the Volcanoes, Mgahinga and Bwindi National Parks. A census of mountain gorillas in the Virunga Massif in March and April 2010 showed that there had been a 26.3% increase in the population over the past seven years.

=== Save Valley ===
During recent decades, cattle fences and livestock have been removed, with the resurgence of wildlife and a recovery of wild habitats.

The Savé Valley Conservancy, in Zimbabwe's southern lowveld area, forms part of the Great Limpopo Transfrontier Park. AWF supports Save Valley Conservancy's anti-poaching efforts and works with government partners.

== Organization ==
The AWF's headquarters are located in Nairobi, Kenya, with regional offices in South Africa, Tanzania, Uganda, Zambia and Washington, DC. The organization is tax-exempt under Section 501(c)(3) of the Internal Revenue Code. As of 2009, there were 36 members of the board and 132 paid staff. Funds are raised through direct mail, grant proposals, Internet appeals, planned giving, cause-related marketing, and membership appeals. The executive heads of the foundation have been:

Heads	Start	End	Title	Notes
Russell E. Train	1961	1969	Chairman and President	Lawyer and judge
Col. John B. George	1963	1968	Executive Director	
Gordon Wilson	1968	1971	Executive Director	Attorney
Nick Arundel	1969		President	Journalist and publisher
John E. Rhea	1971	1975	Executive Director	Business man and big game hunter
Robinson McIlvaine	1975	1982	Executive Director, then President	Former US Ambassador to Kenya
Robert Smith	1982	1985	President	US Foreign Service officer
Paul Schindler	1985	1994	President	Professor of sociology
R. Michael Wright	1994	2001	President	Former vice-president of World Wildlife Fund
Patrick J. Bergin	2001	2007	President	Conservationist with AWF, from 1990
Helen Gichohi	2007	2013	President	Kenyan conservationist
Patrick J. Bergin	2007	2017	CEO	Conservationist with AWF, 1990–2017
Kaddu Sebunya	2019	---	CEO	

The AWF is a member of International Conservation Caucus Foundation's Conservation Council. It is also a member of EarthShare, a national federation that supports American environmental and conservation charities.

== General and cited references ==
- "About AWF". AWF.
- "About Virunga Artisans". Virunga Artisans. Archived from the original on 2011-11-28.
- "AWF's History". AWF. Archived from the original on 26 October 2010.
- "BBB Wise Giving Report for African Wildlife Foundation". BBB. Archived from the original on 2011-11-04.
- Bonner, Raymond (1993). At the hand of man: peril and hope for Africa's wildlife. Knopf. ISBN 0-679-40008-7.
- "Campaign Update – Kenya: Documentary Blasts Conservation Organizations for Abusing Indigenous Peoples". Cultural Survival. 2011-06-22.
- "Celebrating AWF's 40th Anniversary". African Conservation Foundation.
- "Clouds Mountain Gorilla Lodge – Nkuringo, Bwindi Impenetrable Forest". Wildplaces Africa. Archived from the original on 2011-10-03.
- "Conservation Council". ICCF. Archived from the original on 2011-09-15.
- "Conserving Grevy's Zebra in the Samburu District". EarthWatch. Archived from the original on 2011-10-30.
- "Conserving Wildlife". AWF.
- "Conserving Wildlife in Africa: AWF's 40-Year History" (PDF). African Wildlife Foundation Annual Report. 37 (4). Fall 2001.
- "Disney's African Cats to Donate Portion of Ticket Sales to AWF {You Can Help!}". Family and Life in Las Vegas. April 7, 2011. Archived from the original on November 8, 2011.
- Dupain, Jef; Nackoney, Janet; Kibambe, Jean-Paul; Bokelo, Didier; Williams, David (2008). "Maringa-Lopori-Wamba Landscape" (PDF). L'Observatoire des Forêts d'Afrique Centrale.
- "Empowering People". AWF.
- "Exciting News – Two New Rhino Births in Kazungula". Africa Geographic. 17 Jan 2011. Archived from the original on 2011-01-23.
- "Eyeball to eyeball with bull elephant". Hereford Times. 19 April 2006.
- "Great Limpopo Transfrontier Park". UNEP.
- Harrison, Alisa (15 February 2009). "Franchise Entrepreneur Named to IFA's Hall of Fame".
- "Kazungula Landscape". AWF.
- Kimura, Daiji (December 2009). "Taboo of Eating Bonobo Among the Bongando People in the Wamba Region, Democratic Republic of Congo" (PDF). African Study Monographs. 30 (4).
- Last Stand of the Gorilla (The). UNEP/Earthprint. 2010. pp. 69–70. ISBN 978-82-7701-076-2.
- "Limpopo Landscape". AWF.
- Lombe, Sandra (5 March 2011). "Kazungula's Lupani school undergoes transformation". Zambia Post.
- "Making Conservation Our Business". Manyara Ranch Conservancy. Archived from the original on 2010-07-21.
- Masozera, Anna Behm (December 7, 2010). "Census confirms increase in population of the critically endangered Virunga mountain gorillas". Greater Virunga Transboundary Executive Secretariat.
- "Mosi-Oa-Tunya / Victoria Falls Zambia & Zimbabwe" (PDF). United Nations. Archived from the original (PDF) on 2012-04-01.
- Mowat, Farley (1987). Woman In the Mists. New York: Warner Books. ISBN 0-446-51360-1.
- "Pan paniscus". IUCN.
- "Parc W Landscape". AWF.
- "Protecting Land". AWF.
- "Revealing the Leopard". PBS. 19 November 2010.
- "Robinson McIlvaine 1913 - 2001". AWF.
- "Seven Elephants Released into Mozambique". Peace Parks. 10 July 2003. Archived from the original on 20 March 2012.
- "Strategie Nationale et Plan D'Actions pour la Conservation Durable des Elephants au Niger" (PDF) (in French). REPUBLIQUE DU NIGER. June 2010.
- "Strengthening Banhine National Park". AWF.
- "The African Landscape". African Wildlife Foundation.
- Train, Russell E. (2003). Politics, pollution, and pandas: an environmental memoir. Island Press. p. 44. ISBN 1-55963-286-0.
- "Virginia Assembly Commends A Journalist's Life: Arthur W. Arundel". LocalKicks. March 27, 2011.
- "Virunga Landscape". AWF.
- "Who We Support". EarthShare.
- "World's rarest giraffe species clinging on in West Africa". Wildlife Extra. February 2007.
