= Dosso Reserve =

Nature reserve in Niger

Réserve partial de faune du Dosso
- IUCN category IV (habitat/species management area)
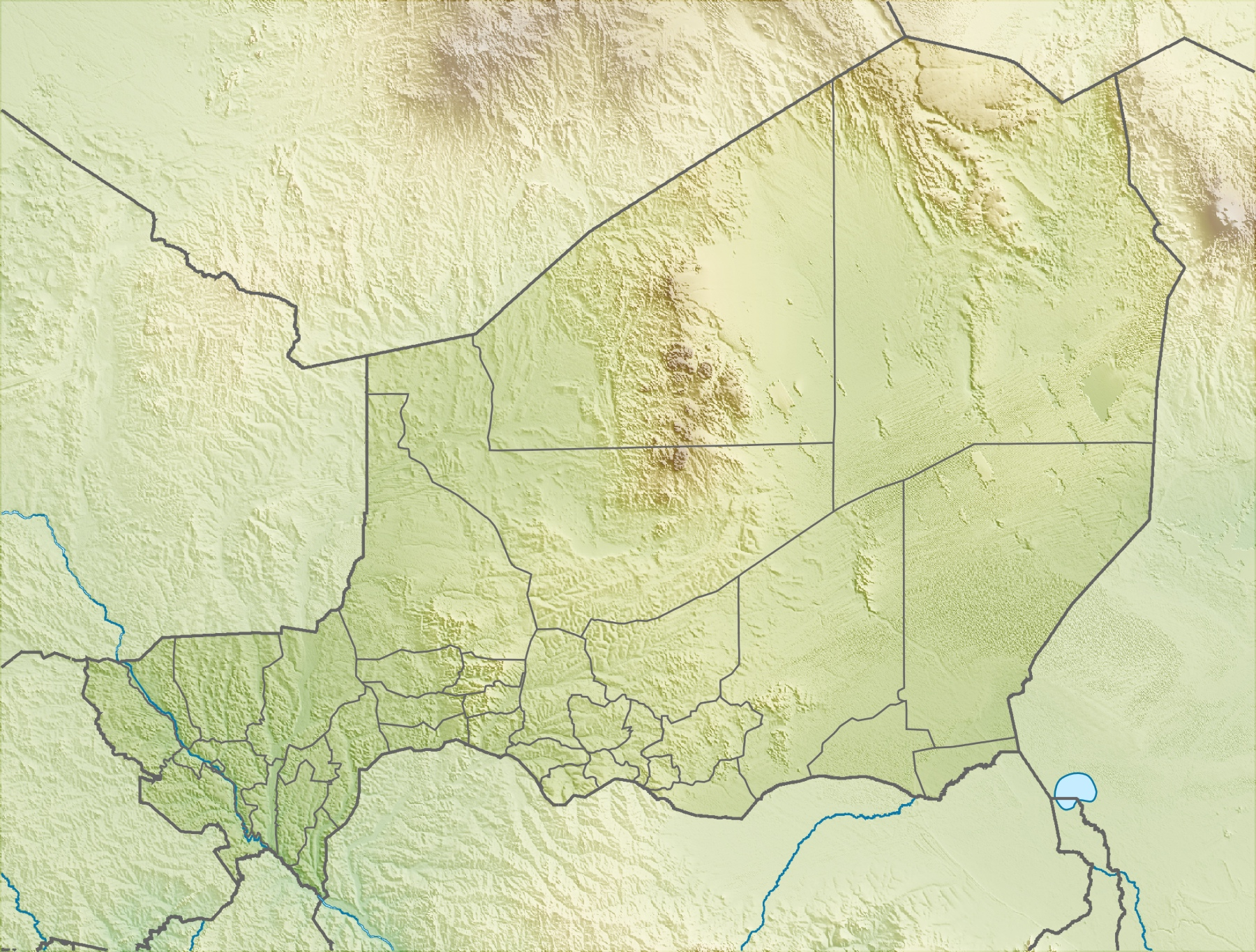
- Location within Niger
- Location: Dosso Region, Niger
- Nearest city: Dosso
- Coordinates: 12°35′59″N 2°36′00″E
- Area: 3,065 km^{2} (1,183 sq mi)
- Established: 8 August 1962
- Governing body: Parcs Nationaux & Reserves – Niger

The Dosso Partial Faunal Reserve is a nature reserve in the southwest Dosso Region of Niger. It is a Partial Faunal Reserve IUCN type IV, established 1 January 1962. The reserve covers 3,065 square kilometres in the mouth of Dallol Bosso valley, a seasonal wash and ancient riverbed running from the Azawagh region, near where it reaches the Niger River valley. It is situated near the W du Niger National Park.

== Faunal protection ==
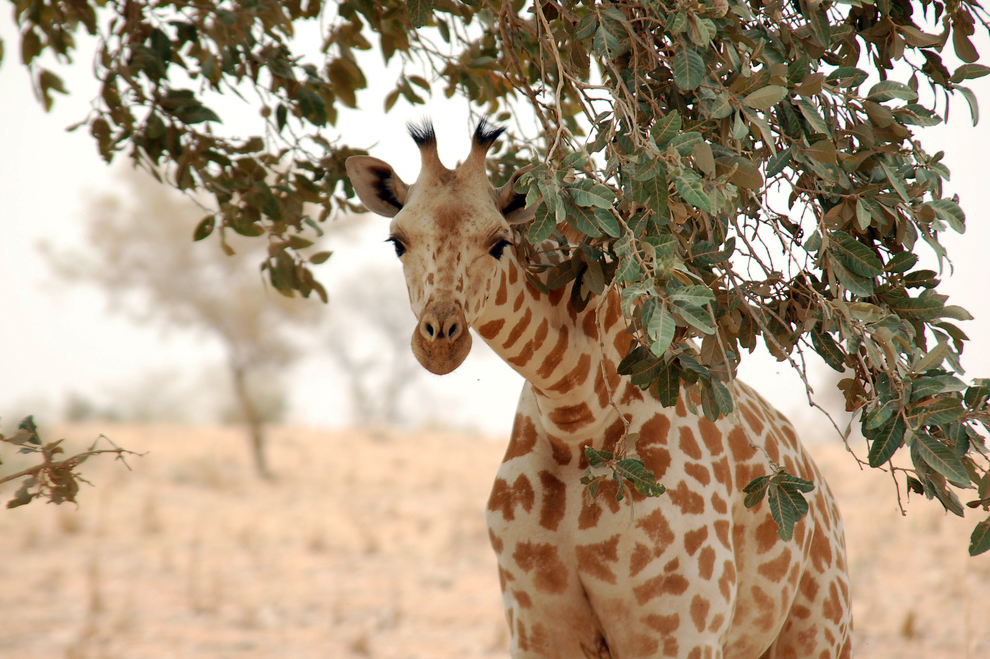
A West African Giraffe peeks under an Acacia tree in the tiger bush near Kouré, Niger. This area the marks the northern range of their migration, which runs south to the Dosso Partial Reserve of the Niger River in the Dry season.

The Dosso reserve exists to protect animals of the W Transborder Park complex, most notably African elephants, Hippos, a number of types of gazelles, and the West African Giraffe (Giraffa camelopardalis peralta). This reserve marks the southern end of the migration path of the last sustainable herd of West African Giraffe, who travel north to the region around Kouré (some 80 km southeast of Niamey) in the rainy season. The tiger bush uplands around Kouré are not within a formal park, but are a center for tourism and Giraffe conservation, and the herds have protected status in Niger. The Dosso reserve provides forage and homes for the Giraffe in the dry season, and the area has restrictions on woodcutting and habitat damage which would affect Giraffe sustainability. NGOs near Kouré promoted woodcutting businesses in the late 1990s which have profoundly altered the habitat, and driven some Giraffe to raid local gardens for food, making the protections offered by the Dosso reserve crucial.
