= Association to Safeguard Giraffes in Niger =

Nigerian non-governmental organization

- Formation: 1996
- Type: NGO
- Purpose: Environmental protection
- Region served: Niger
- Official language: French
- Leader: Omer DOVI
- Website: www.facebook.com/ASGNofficiel/

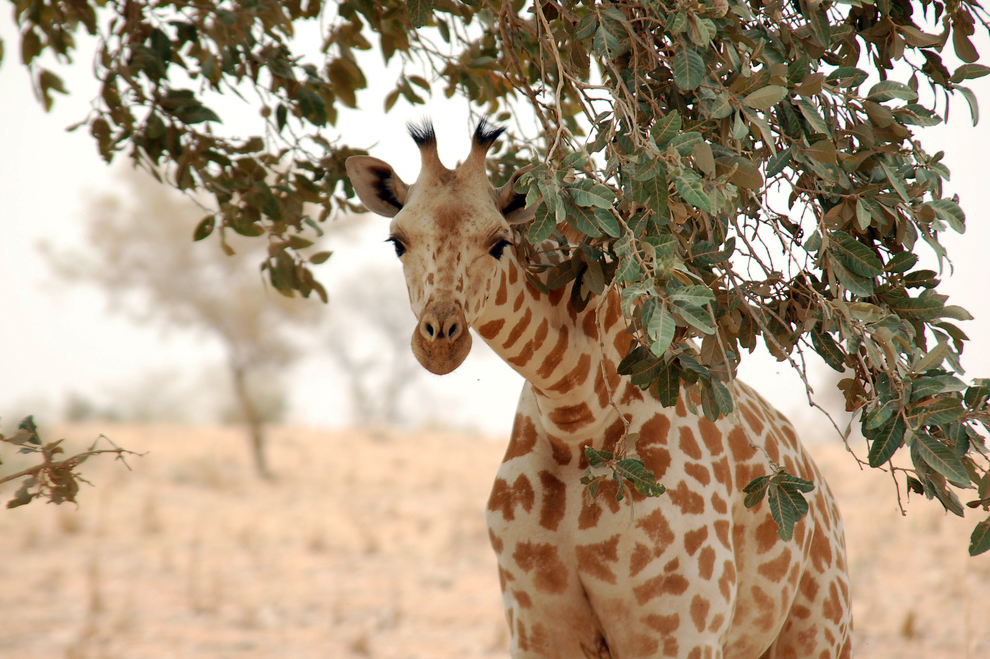
A West African giraffe peeks under an Acacia tree in the tiger bush near Koure, Niger. This area marks the northern range of their migration, which runs south to the Dosso Partial Reserve of the Niger River in the Dry season.

The Association to Safeguard Giraffes in Niger (ASGN, L'Association de sauvegarde des girafes du Niger) is an organization formed to help the giraffes of Niger, including ensuring the preservation of their habitat in the face of devastating agricultural expansion.

The ASGN was founded in 1996 with the objective of saving the last population of West African Giraffes in Niger, a highly endangered species. When the society was formed there were only 50 individuals of the species surviving in the country. The ASGN managed to obtain the establishment of a protected zone for giraffes in the Kouré region within which all poaching is prohibited. The society encourages eco-tourism, employing local people as far as possible. By 2007 a total of 164 giraffes were counted in the park.

ASGN and its partners have assisted the local community with bore holes, cereal banks, grain mills, seeds and fertilizer to encourage them to protect the giraffes, which can be destructive to crops. However, the population of giraffes is threatened by loss of its habitat, the tiger bush, which is gradually being cleared for agriculture. The African Wildlife Foundation (AWF) partners with the ASGN in conservation efforts. The AWF is helping with reforestation. In August 2010, a tree nursery in Kouré produced about 3,500 seedlings. AWF planned to establish another nursery in the area in 2011.
