= Central African Regional Program for the Environment =

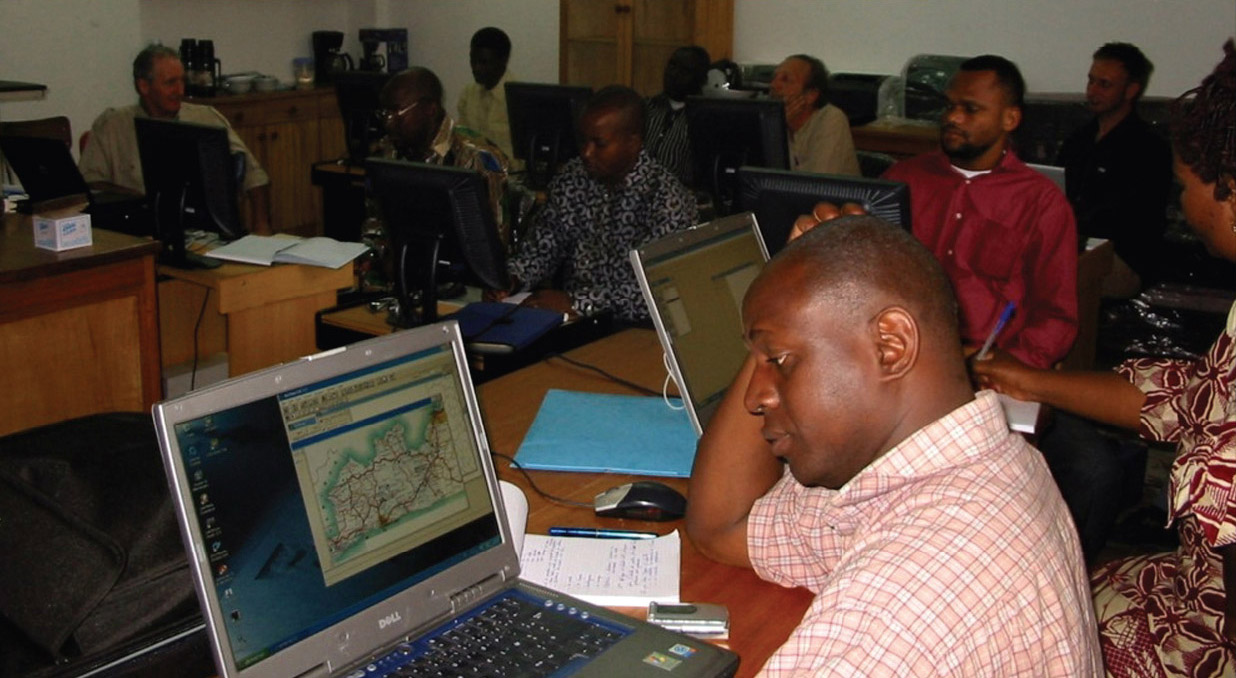
CARPE employees at work

CARPE the Central African Regional Program for the Environment is a United States Agency for International Development (USAID) initiative aimed at promoting sustainable natural resource management in the Congo Basin. It aims at protecting the forest in countries such as Gabon, Cameroon and the Republic of the Congo providing critical habitat for biodiversity conservation. CARPE works to reduce the rate of forest degradation and loss of biodiversity by supporting other groups and working together towards an increased local, national, and regional framework for natural resource management.

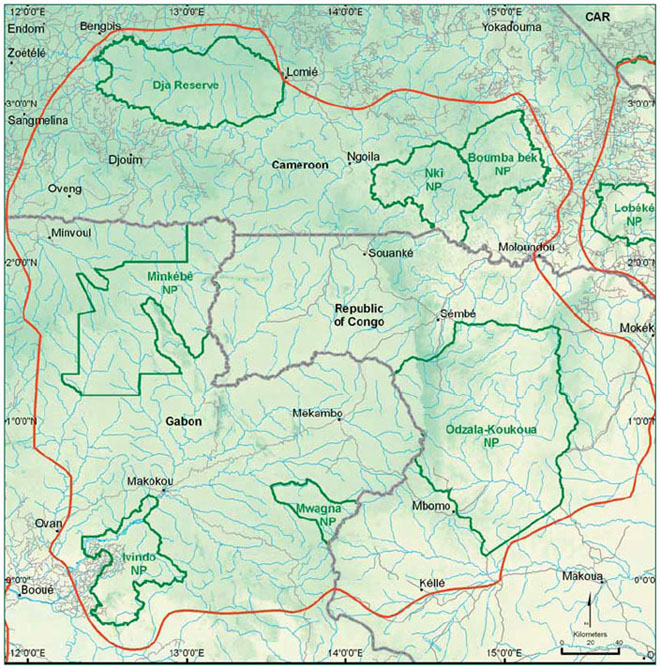
The Congo forest basin area which CARPE seeks to protect

Since 1997, CARPE has worked in protected areas such as the Minkébé National Park in north-east Gabon and has worked together with agencies such as the WWF and provided funding along with the European Union, UNESCO, the Netherlands Development Cooperation and the French Global Environment Facility (FFEM).
