= Kaddu Sebunya =

Ugandan conservationist

- Born: Kaddu Kiwe Sebunya; 1965 (age 60–61); Kampala, Uganda
- Education: Fletcher School; Imperial-Wye College
- Employer: African Wildlife Foundation
- Known for: Government relations, conservation, and international development
- Title: Chief executive officer
- Board member of: Conservation Strategy Fund; Rare Conservation

Kaddu Kiwe Sebunya (born 1965), is a Ugandan conservationist leader. Since 2019, Sebunya is the CEO at the African Wildlife Foundation (AWF), an international conservation organization founded in 1961 with the intent of preserving the Africa's wildlife and natural habitats, based in Nairobi, Kenya. Prior to his appointment, Sebunya was the AWF president, since 2016. Sebunya's career lies in conservation of nature and other related activities, he previously worked with Water Aid, Oxfam, International Union for Conservation of Nature (IUCN), Peace Corps, and Conservation International.

== Early life and education ==
Sebunya was born in 1965, and grew in Kampala, Uganda. He attended Makerere University for his undergraduate degree, where he graduated with a bachelor's degree in social sciences. In 2001, Sebunya enrolled at Imperial College of London in England to pursue a post-graduate degree, he graduated with a master's degree in Sustainable Resource Management and Policy in 2003. Sebunya also holds a master's degree in law, policy and diplomacy from The Fletcher School, Tufts University USA.

== Career ==
In 1992, Sebunya began his career serving as a project manager at WaterAid in Uganda. From 1994 to 1996, he worked as a relief program officer at Oxfam. Subsequently, Sebunya held a post as the associate director for the Peace Corps in Uganda, his career began to focus more on conservation, until 1998. From 2002 to 2006, Sebunya was a Senior Policy Adviser at Conservation International.

In 2006, Sebunya moved to Washington, DC and became Director of Programs at the International Union for Conservation of Nature (IUCN). He developed and implemented a legislative program to engage U.S. lawmakers on issues affecting conservation and development in Africa. In 2013, Sebunya became Chief of Party at Solimar International before being elected as the African Wildlife Foundation’s president in 2016. He is an active member of Club of Rome, East African Wildlife Society, and European-Union High-level Group on Africa-Europe Partnership.

== Leadership at AWF ==
In 2016, Sebunya was elected as the president of the African Wildlife Foundation (AWF) before becoming the chief executive officer in 2019, based in Nairobi, Kenya. African Wildlife Foundation focuses on the conservation of Africa's wildlife and natural habitats. Under his leadership, AWF has focused on integrating conservation with African development, emphasizing the need for wildlife preservation to align with the continent's economic growth and the well-being of its people. He has worked to build partnerships with African governments, private sector entities, and international organizations to address issues such as habitat loss, climate change, and wildlife trafficking. In 2022, AWF, Government of Rwanda, and IUCN, jointly convened the launch of the IUCN Africa Protected Areas Congress (APAC). APAC was reported the first ever continent-wide gathering of African leaders, citizens, and interest groups to discuss the role of protected areas in conserving nature, safeguarding Africa's iconic wildlife, delivering vital life-supporting ecosystem services, promoting sustainable development while conserving Africa's cultural heritage and traditions.

Sebunya believes that Africa's wildlife and natural landscapes are critical assets that can fuel tourism, create jobs, and enhance the global environmental agenda. He advocates for a model where African leadership and local communities take ownership of conservation efforts, ensuring that the continent's natural resources are protected for future generations.

== Advocacy ==
In 2017, Sebunya featured in DW, he asserted that wildlife is central to Africa's identity and economic development. He emphasized the need for African ownership of conservation efforts and highlighted the alarming decline in species like elephants, lions, and rhinos due to poaching and habitat loss. Sebunya called for sustainable practices that integrate wildlife protection with community development, advocating for a proactive approach to ensure the continent's natural heritage is preserved for future generations.

Sebunya has published in various African news outlets including The New times and Daily Nation, discussing the continent's biodiversity challenges and the factors to advance Africa's conservation movement among others.
