= Kouré, Niger =

Kouré
- Location within Niger
- Coordinates: 13.3106°N 2.576°E
- Country: Niger
- Region: Tillabéri
- Department: Kollo

Area
  - Total: 934.8 km^{2} (360.9 sq mi)

Population (2012 census)
  - Total: 46,249
  - Density: 49.47/km^{2} (128.1/sq mi)

Kouré is a rural community located 60 kilometres (37 mi) east of Niamey, the capital of Niger. The town lies on both sides of the road from Niamey to Dallol Bosso. As of 2012, it had a population of 46,249.

Kouré is best known for West African giraffes (Giraffa camelopardalis peralta), an endemic subspecies of West Africa. The population of giraffes in Niger reached a low of 50 animals 1984, but according to the Association to Safeguard Giraffes in Niger (ASGN) there are now 170 of them. ASGN and its partners have assisted the local community with bore holes, cereal banks, grain mills, seeds and fertilizer to encourage them to protect the giraffes, which can be destructive to crops. However, the population of giraffes is threatened by loss of the tiger bush habitat, which is gradually being cleared for agriculture.

The African Wildlife Foundation is helping with reforestation. In August 2010, a tree nursery in Kouré produced about 3,500 seedlings. AWF planned to establish another nursery in the area in 2011.

In July 2011 the Association des Scouts du Niger ran an international solidarity camp at Kouré. About 300 young people aged 18 to 25 years from various countries attended. The theme was promoting youth participation in development through a culture of peace, tolerance and nonviolence.

A mass shooting occurred here in 2020.

== Gallery ==
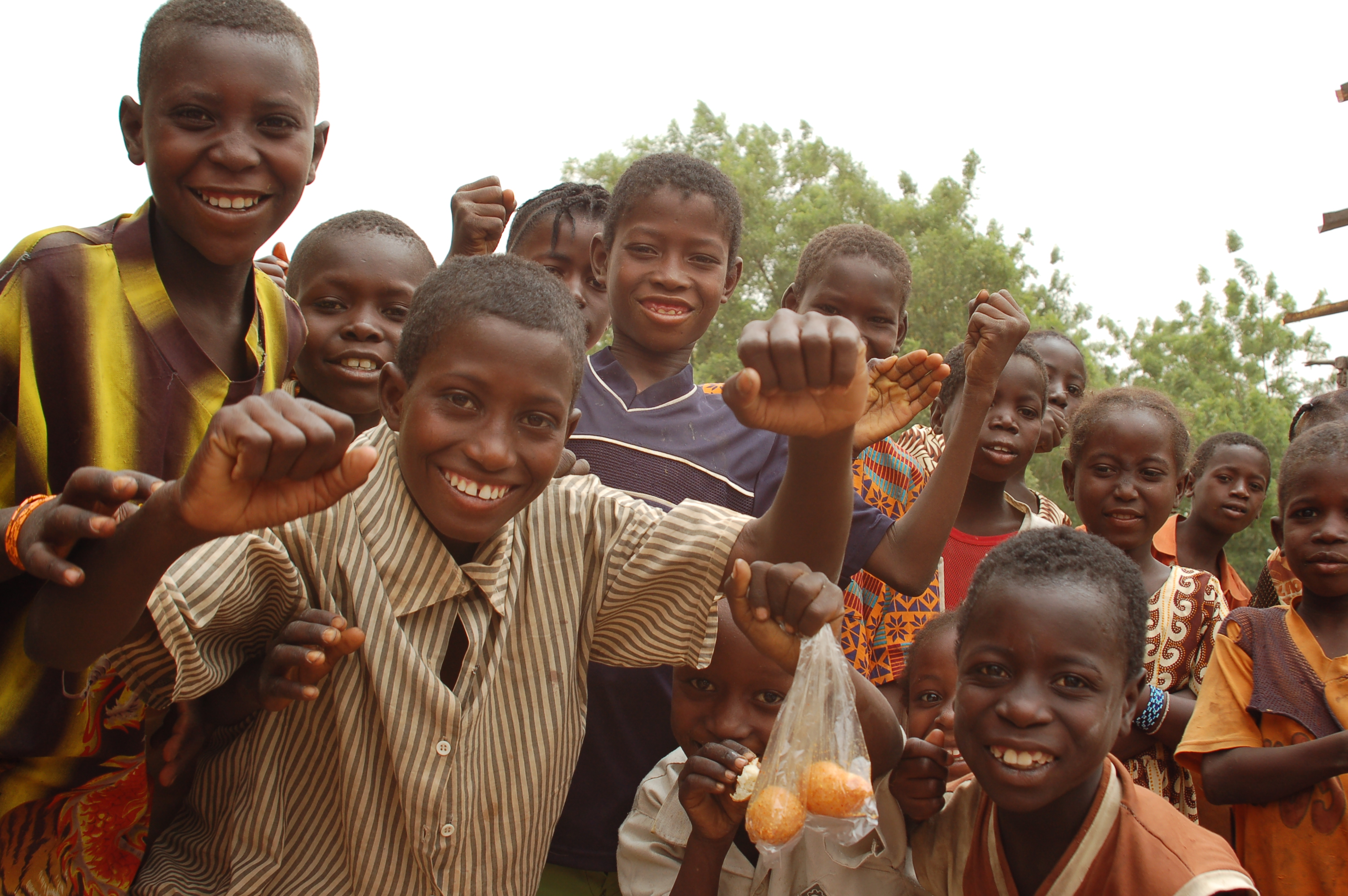
Children/youth in Kouré village March 2006

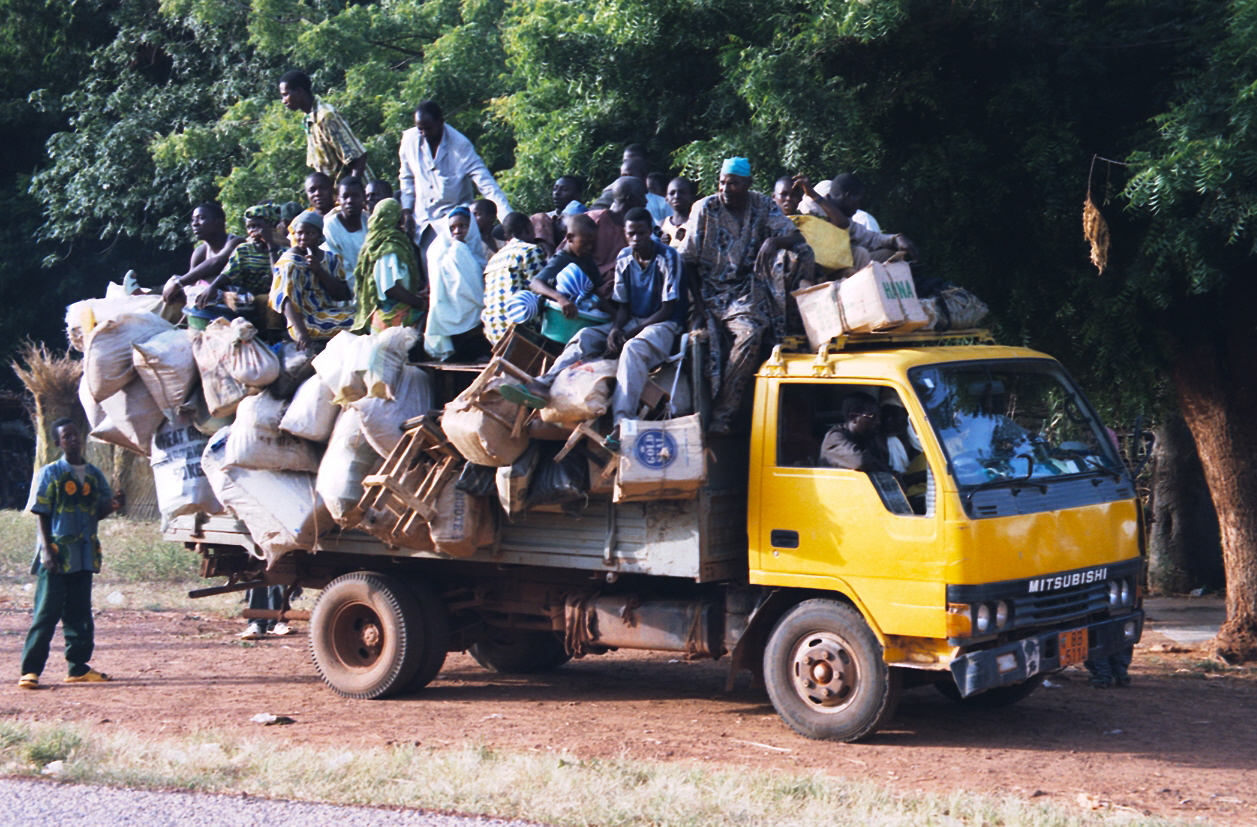
Truck on the road between Niamey and Kouré

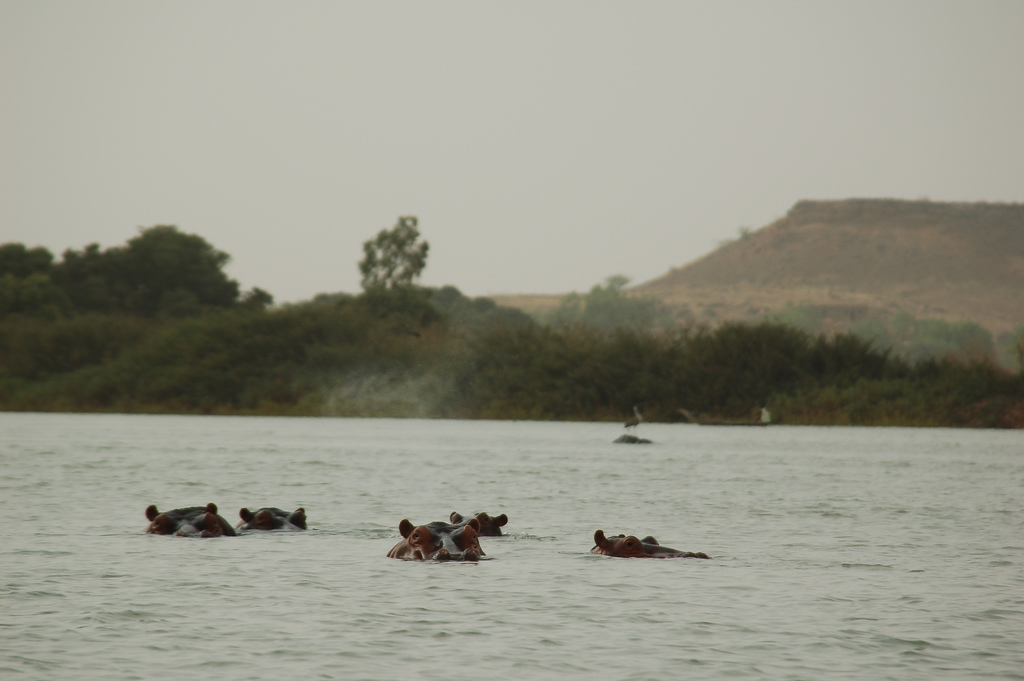
Hippos in the Niger River to the south of Kouré

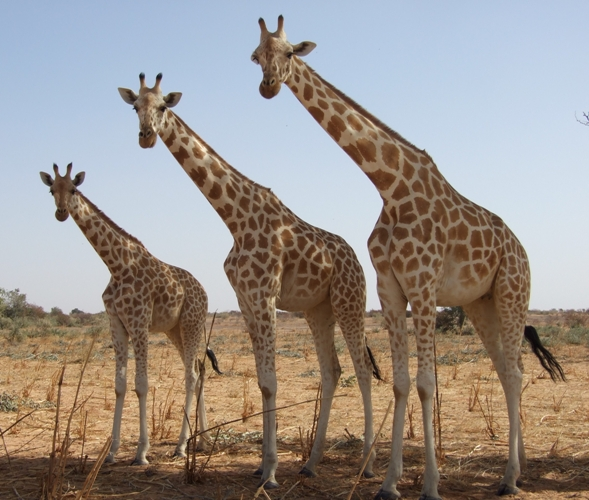
Giraffes

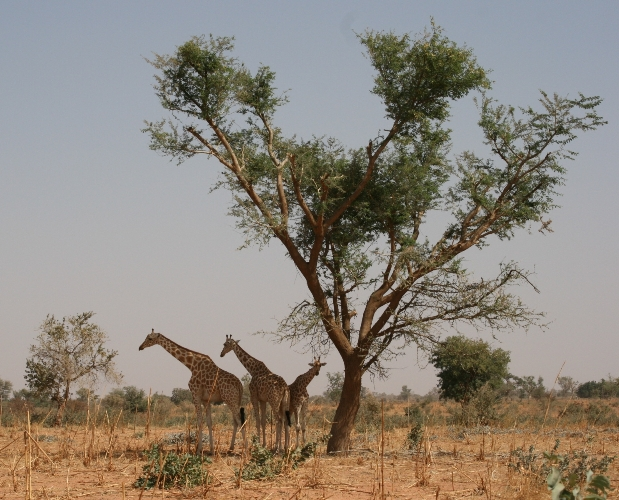
Giraffes

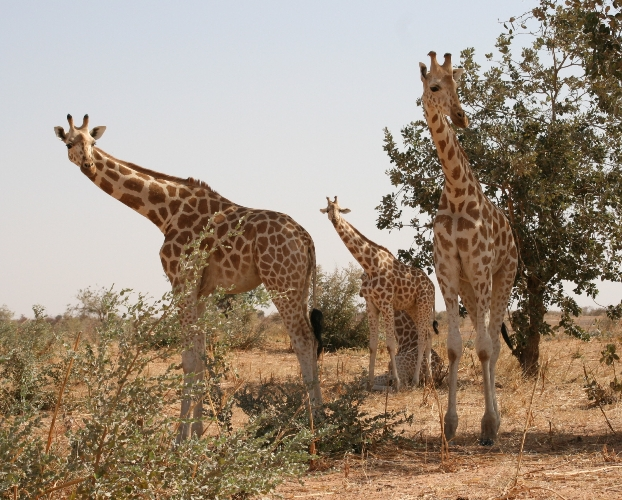
Giraffes
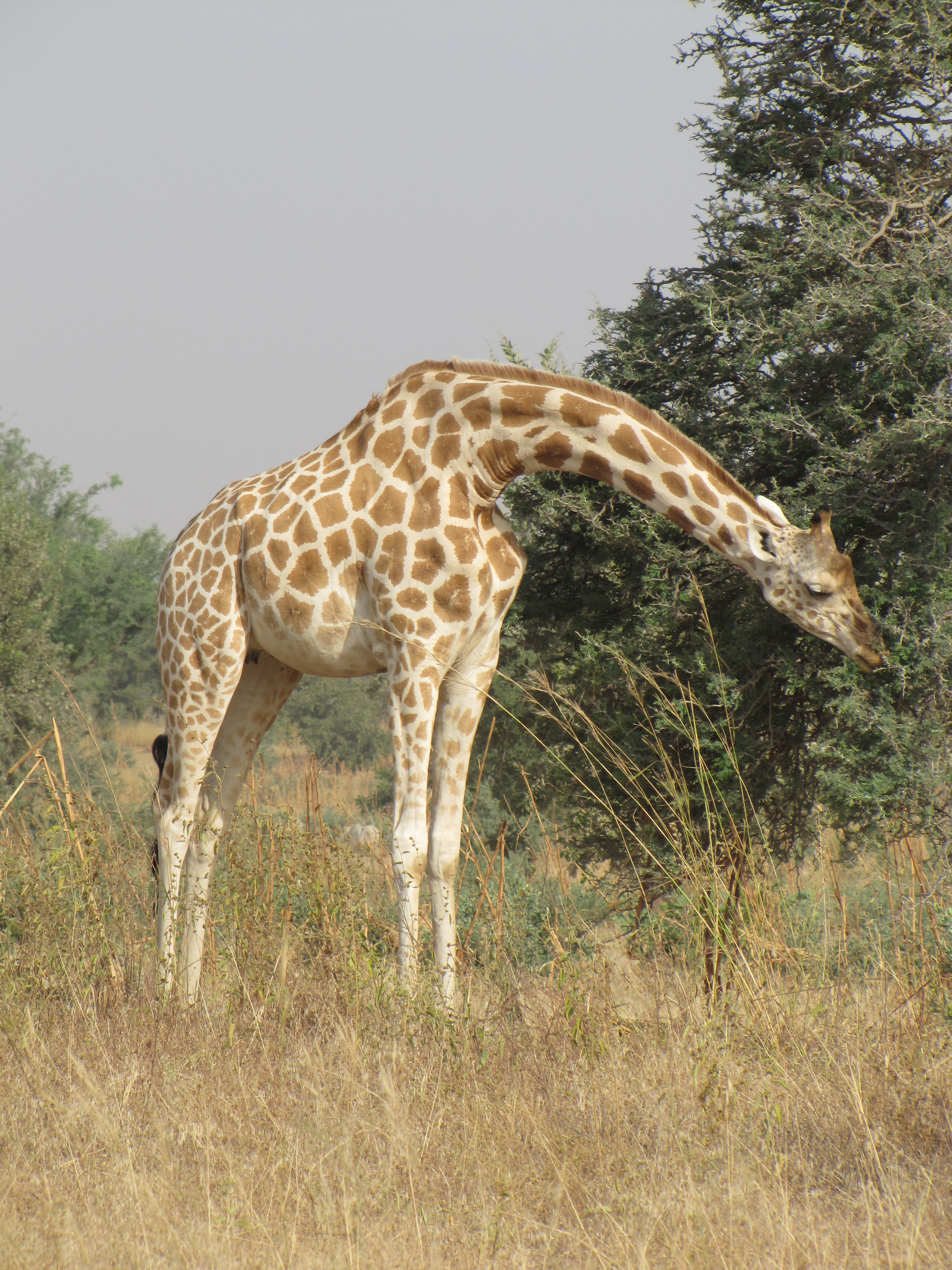
West African Giraffe near Kouré, November 2010

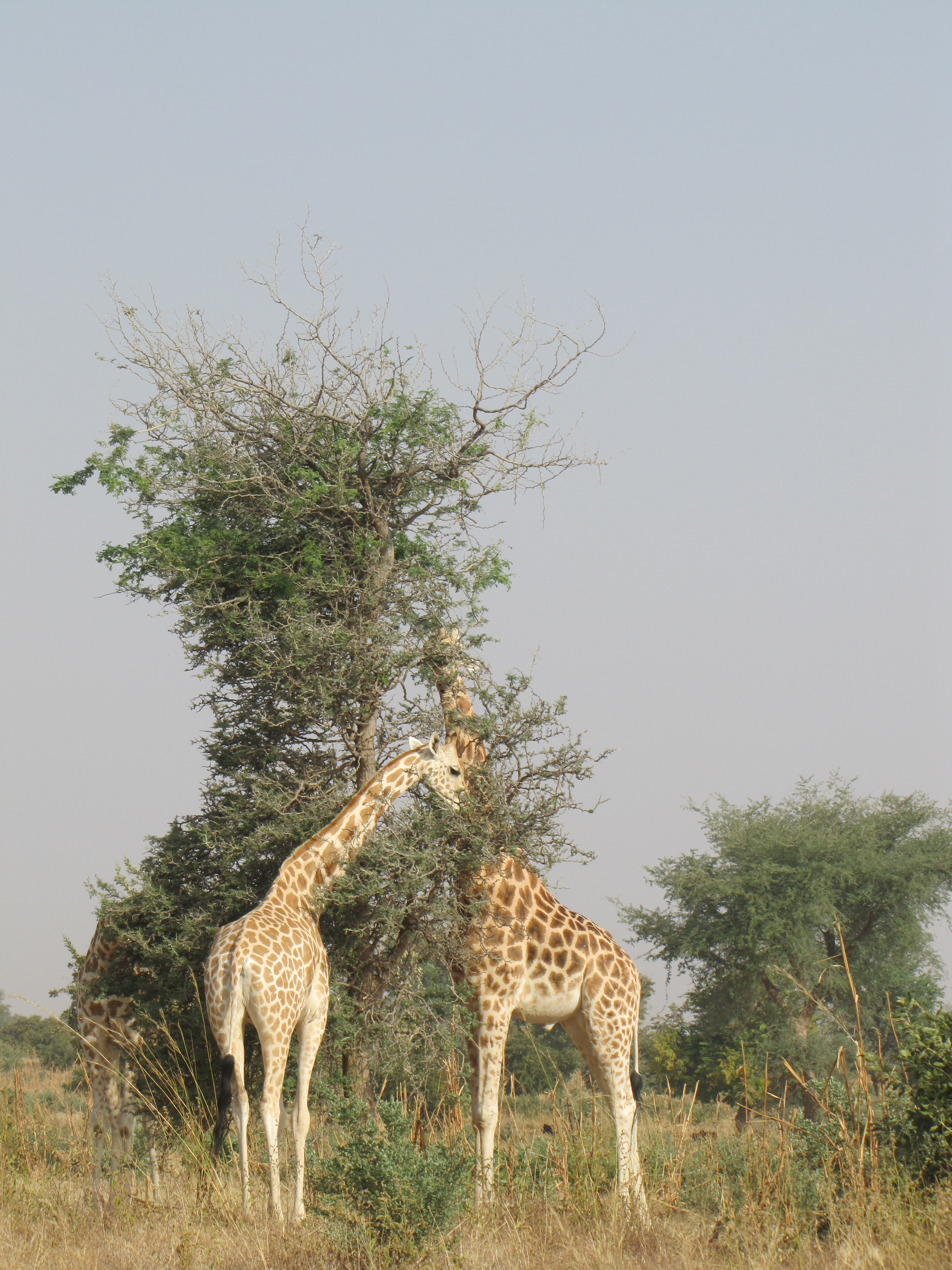
Pair of Giraffes

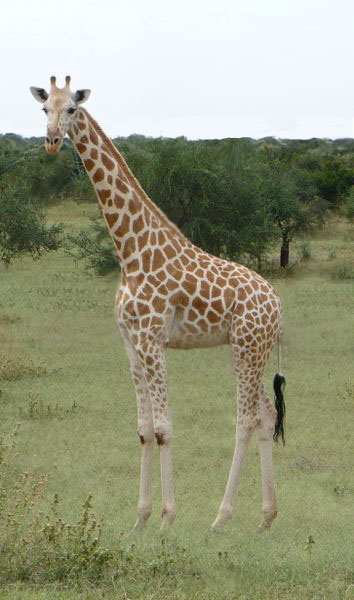
Giraffe standing in Kouré reserve
