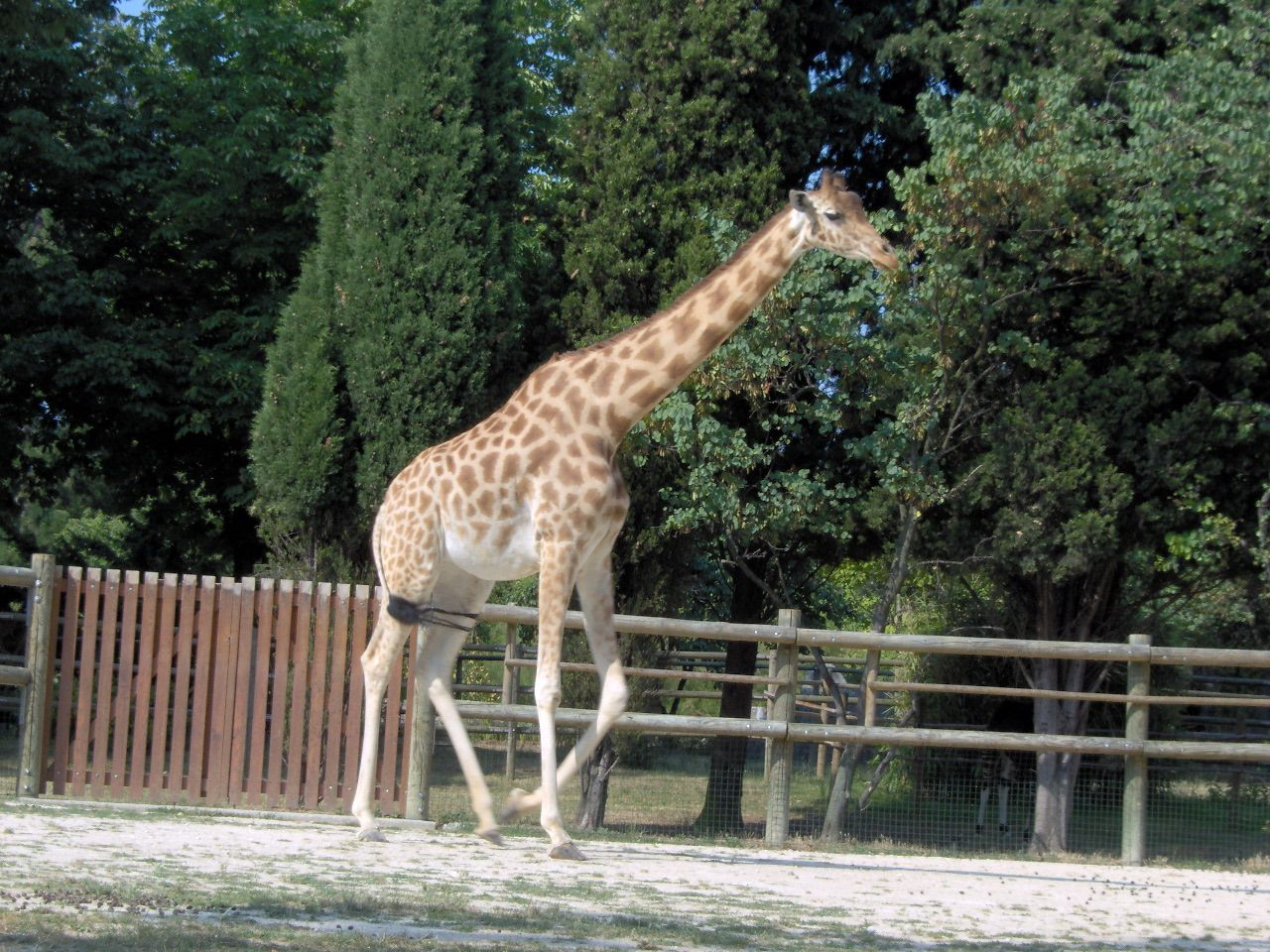
- Kordofan giraffe in Vincennes Zoo, Paris

Conservation status
- Critically Endangered (IUCN 3.1)

Scientific classification
- Kingdom: Animalia
- Phylum: Chordata
- Class: Mammalia
- Order: Artiodactyla
- Family: Giraffidae
- Genus: Giraffa
- Species: G. camelopardalis
- Subspecies: G. c. antiquorum

Trinomial name
- Giraffa camelopardalis antiquorum Jardine/Swainson, 1835
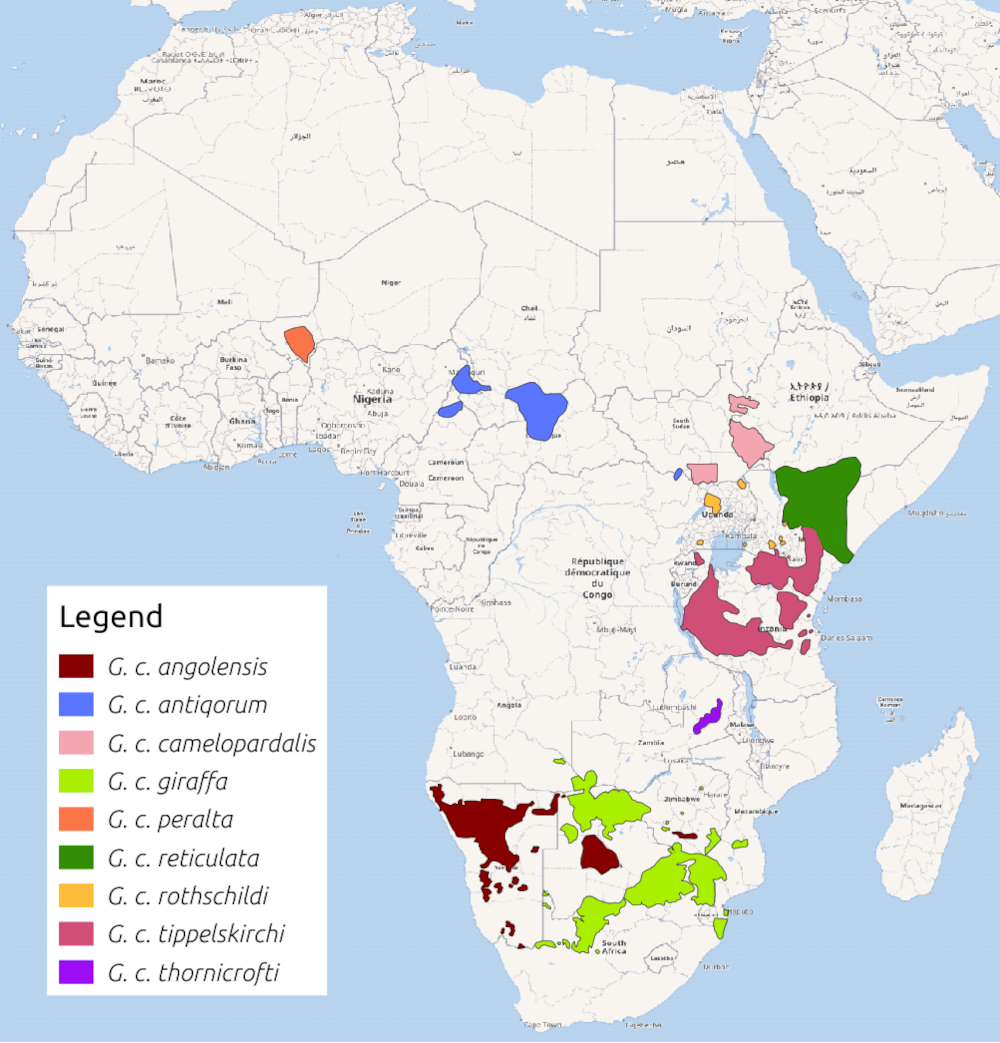
- Range in blue

= Kordofan giraffe =

Subspecies of giraffe

The Kordofan giraffe (Giraffa antiquorum or Giraffa camelopardalis antiquorum) is a species or subspecies of giraffe found in northern Cameroon, southern Chad, the Central African Republic, and possibly western Sudan. They usually live in tree savannas, bush savannas and thorn savannas. Compared to most other subspecies, the Kordofan giraffe is relatively small at 3.8 to 4.7 m (12 ft 6 in to 15 ft 5 in), with more irregular spots on the inner legs. There are around 2,300 individuals living in the wild. In the wild, female Kordofan giraffes live in loose groups, whilst males live solitary. They have an average lifespan of around 35 years.

The Christian Science Monitor lists only 38 individuals being alive in the embattled Garamba National Park in The Democratic Republic of Congo due to poaching; their skin is used for luxury goods and they are said to produce enough meat to feed poachers for weeks. Recent genetic studies also shows distinct genetic populations of giraffes that makes conservation of these subspecies even more important.

The population in the Bénoué Complex, Cameroon (a landscape that consists of three national parks: Bénoué National Park, Faro National Park, Bouba Njida National Park; interconnected by 29 hunting zones), numbers fewer than 300 individuals as of 2023. Illegal hunting represents the greatest threat to the subspecies, particularly in Bénoué National Park, where it may become locally extinct without further conservation interventions.

The Kordofan giraffe eats a variety of sticks, leaves and bark, usually of Acacia trees. Additionally they eat grasses, buds, as well as seeds. Like other giraffes, they classify as herbivores.

== Taxonomy ==
Its English name is a reference to Kordofan in Sudan.

== Habitat ==
They are naturally found in northern Cameroon, Chad, Central African Republic and western Sudan. Kordofan giraffe live in steppes, as well as bush, tree and shrub savannas. Historically some confusion has existed over the exact range limit of this subspecies compared to the West African giraffe, with populations in e.g. northern Cameroon formerly assigned to the latter. Genetic work has also revealed that all "West African giraffe" in European zoos are in fact Kordofan giraffe. It has been suggested that the Nigerian giraffe's ancestor dispersed from East to North Africa during the Quaternary period and thereafter migrated to its current Sahel distribution in West Africa in response to the development of the Sahara desert.

== Appearance ==
The Kordofan giraffe has spots similarly to other giraffe subspecies. They are even-toed ungulates and walk on long legs. Compared to other subspecies they are rather small; males are on average 6 m (19 ft 8 in) tall, females reach a height of 4.5 m (14 ft 9 in). Their shoulder height lies between 2 metres (6 ft 7 in) for females to 3.5 metres (11 ft 6 in) for males. On top of that they have more irregular spots on the inner legs.

They have a blue tongue, which is around 50 centimetres (1 ft 8 in) long.

== Diet ==
Like other giraffe subspecies, the Kordofan giraffe is a herbivore. Its diet consist of a variety of grasses, shrubs, buds, branches, leaves and bark, as well as seeds. Their main food source comes from the Acacia trees.

== Conservation ==
The Kordofan giraffe is one of the most endangered giraffe subspecies. The population of kordofan giraffes declined more than 80% in the last 35 years, IUCN Red List has classified the Kordofan giraffe as Critically Endangered species in 2018.

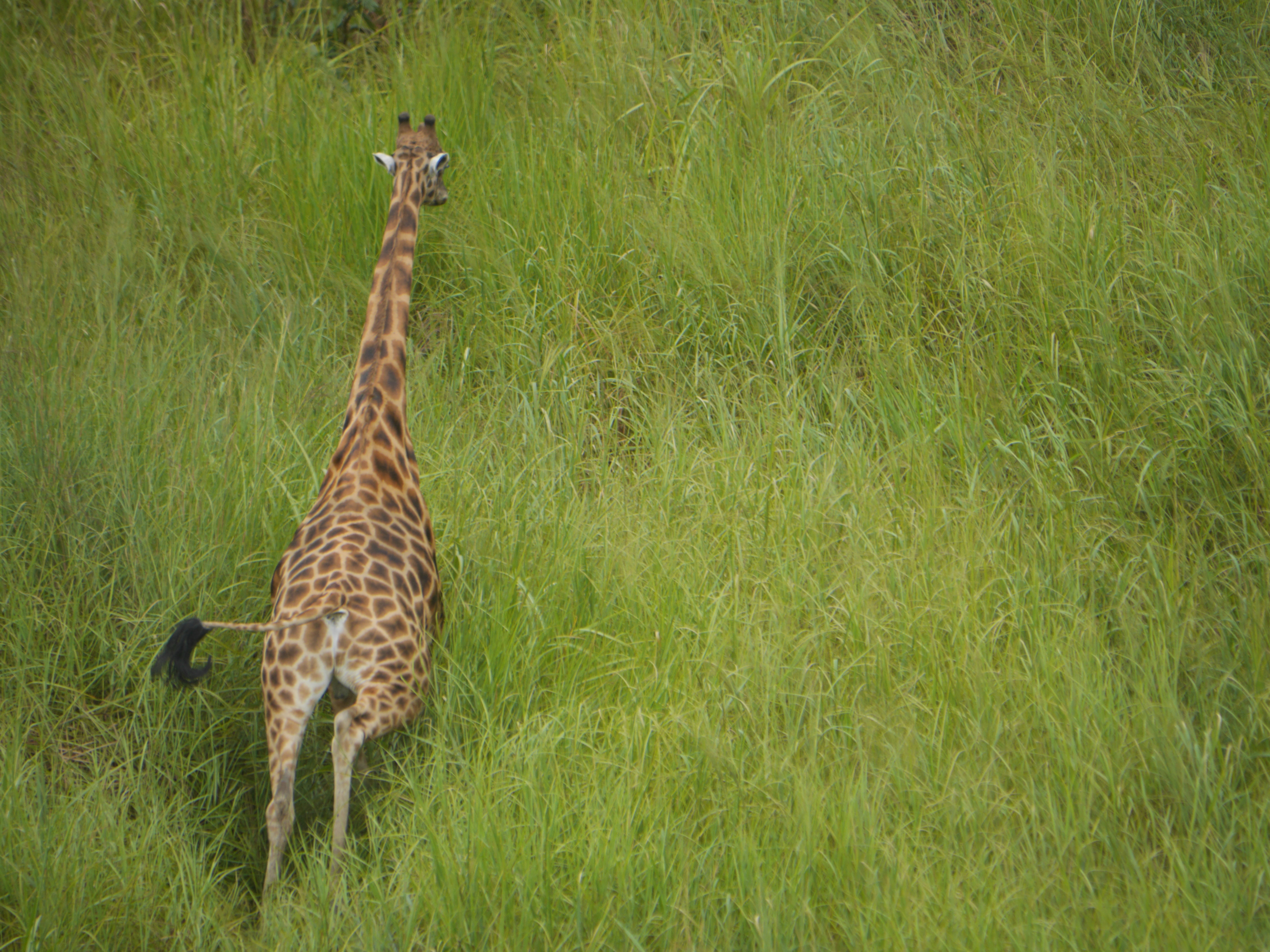
Kordofan giraffe in the Garamba National Park, DRC

In the Garamba National Park in DRC, their population was declined from 300 in 1976 to 100 in 2008. Another estimate is from 356 in 1993 to only 86 in 2007. There also estimate that 86 in 2003 and only 38 in 2016. Most recent estimate is from 71 in 2022 to over 80 in 2024. Poaching is the greatest threat to Garamba's giraffe population. It has brought Giraffe Conservation Foundation (GCF) collaboration with ICCN and African Parks and DRC's wildlife authority to save last giraffes in DRC since 2016. Fortunately, DRC government have successfully increased in Kordofan giraffe population in park to more than 90 individuals.

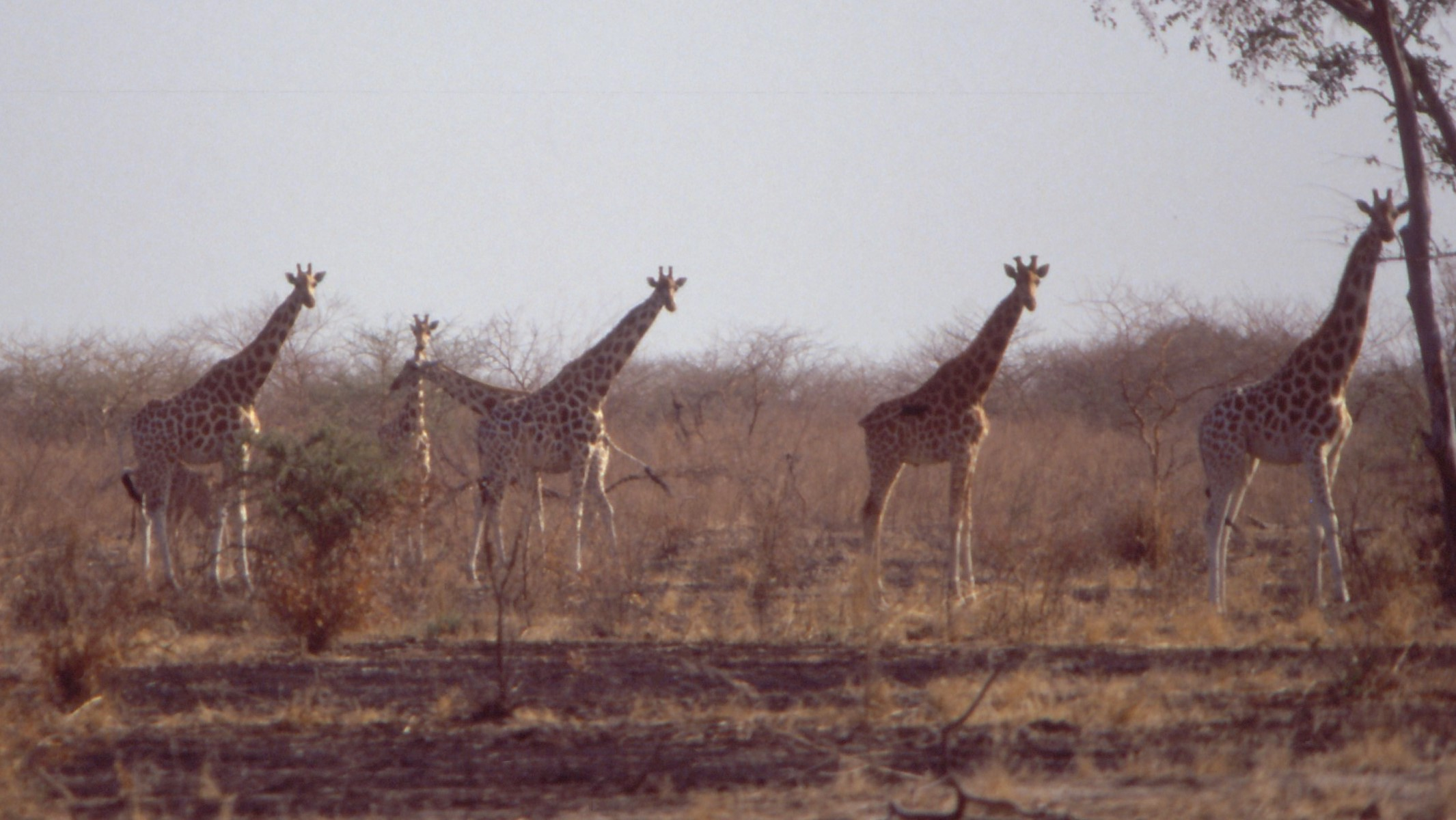
A group of Kordofan giraffes in the Waza National Park, Cameroon

In Bénoué Complex on Cameroon(a landscape that consists of three national parks: Bénoué National Park, Faro National Park, Bouba Njida National Park); interconnected by 29 hunting zones), it is estimated fewer than 300 population remained in 2023. Illegal hunting is a major threat to giraffe in the Bénoué National Park, where it may become locally extinct without further conservation efforts. In an aerial survey by Wildlife Conservation Society of Waza National Park it was revealed that at least 350 individuals remained. GCF drafting the first-ever National Giraffe Conservation Strategy and Action Plan with together Cameroon government, to help conservation efforts for Kordofan giraffe in the country.

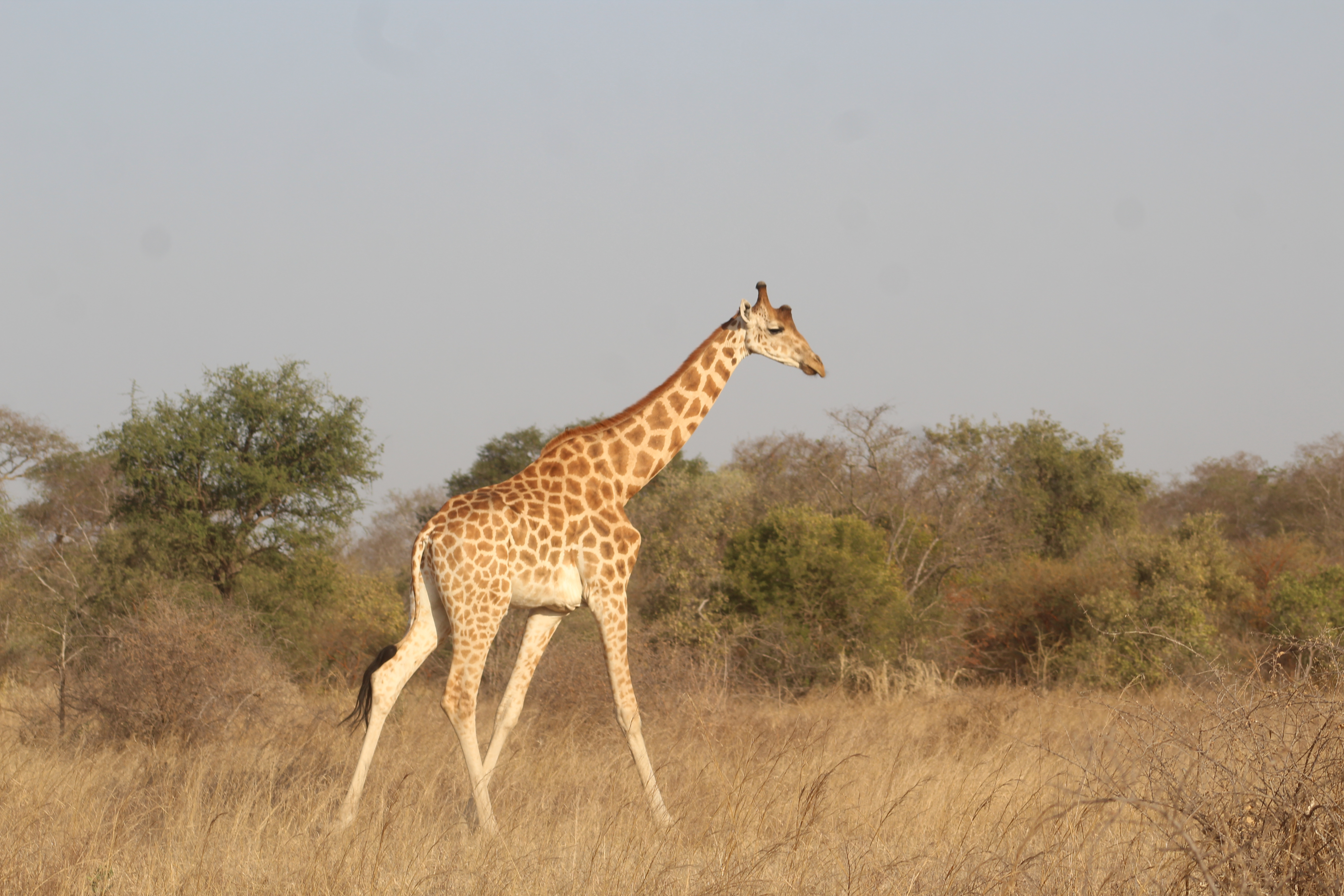
Kordofan giraffe in the Zakouma National Park, Chad

Zakouma National Park of Chad is home to 60% of Kordofan giraffe remaining on earth. According to a series of aerial surveys in park between 2005 and 2016, population of giraffe in park increased from 292 to 947. GCF drafting the first-ever conservation efforts for Kordofan giraffe in the country in collaboration with the African Parks. According to the tracking of giraffes' movements using GPS satellite tagging, some giraffe in the park spend significant time at boundaries of the park.
