= Netherlands Development Cooperation =

The Netherlands Development Cooperation is an important branch of the Dutch Ministry of Foreign Affairs. It is responsible for development and funding, particularly in the developing world in poverty stricken areas of Africa, and allocates €4 billion a year on tackling it.

The Netherlands is therefore among the world's leading aid donors, giving about 1% of its gross national product in development assistance. The country consistently contributes large amounts of aid through multilateral channels, especially the UN Development Programme, the international financial institutions, and EU programs. A large portion of Dutch aid funds also are channeled through private ("co-financing") organizations that have almost total autonomy in choice of projects. According to the OECD, 2019 official development assistance from the Netherlands decreased 4.1% to USD 5.3 billion.

The policy priorities of Dutch aid are basic social facilities, reproductive health care, the environment, and aid to least developed countries. Dutch aid also is targeted on emergency aid, programs for the private sector, and international education.

The Netherlands is a member of the European Bank for Reconstruction and Development, which recently initiated economic reforms in central Europe. The Dutch strongly support the Middle East peace process and in 1998 earmarked US$29 million in contributions to international donor-coordinated activities for the occupied territories and also for projects in which they worked directly with Palestinian authorities. These projects included improving environmental conditions and support for multilateral programs in cooperation with local non-governmental organizations. In 1998, the Dutch provided significant amounts of aid to the former Yugoslavia and Africa. The Dutch also provided significant amounts of relief aid to victims of Hurricane Mitch in Central America.

The Netherlands Development Cooperation has worked together with global environmental groups such as WWF at protecting some forested areas in countries like Gabon, such as the Minkébé National Park
