= National Centre of Management of Fauna Reserves =

Organization in Benin

- Formation: 1996
- Type: Government Agency
- Purpose: Environmental protection
- Headquarters: Cotonou
- Region served: Benin

The National Centre of Management of Fauna Reserves (Centre National de Gestion des Réserves de Faune, or CENAGREF) is an organization in Benin established on 2 April 1996. Its mission is to conserve and manage nature reserves, national parks, wildlife reserves, special reserves and their buffer zones. CENAGREF is active in the Pendjari National Park and the W National Park. CENAGREF reports to the Ministry of Environment and Nature Protection.

Park W is one of the first trans-border biosphere reserves in West Africa, extending into Benin, Burkino Faso and Niger. The park has a Sudanian climate and is watered by tributaries of the Niger River. Habitats include gallery forests and all kinds of savanna. Fauna is plentiful and diverse, including cheetah, lycaon, leopard and sassaby. The peripheral municipalities of Banikoara, Kandi, Karimama and Malanville had to cede lands to the biosphere reserve. CENAGREF works with the Italian NGO Ricerca e Cooperazione (Research and Cooperation) to help develop these peripheral communities. The Italian Ministry of Foreign Affairs provides some funding. Programs include participative management of natural resources, environmental education, support to shepherds, credit and agriculture activities.
