= Dallol Bosso =

Seasonal river valley in Dosso, Niger

Coordinates: 13°51′40″N 3°05′09″E

Designations

Ramsar Wetland
- Designated: 26 April 2004
- Reference no.: 1382

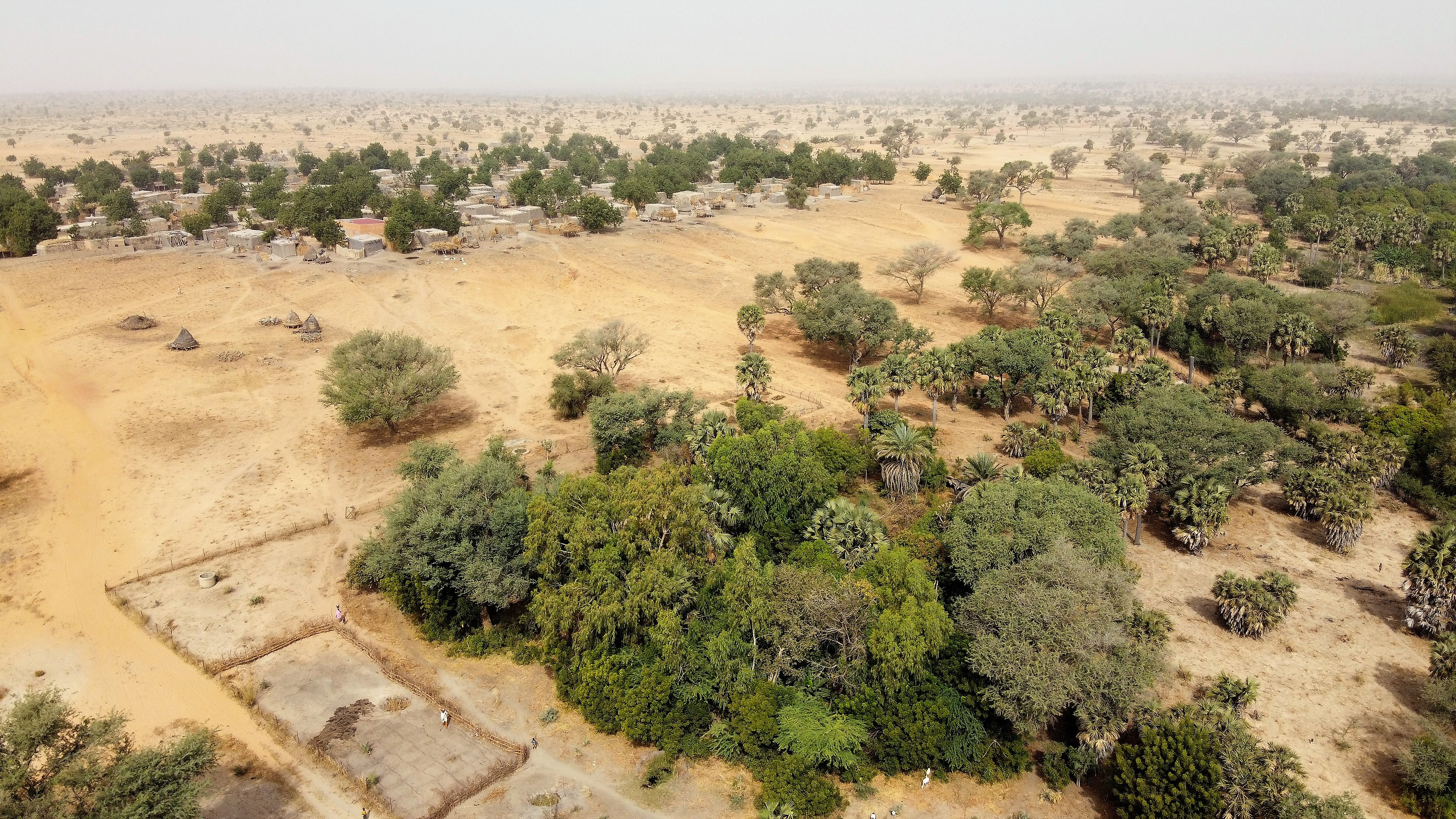
The village of Niabéré Bella Zarma with (in the foreground) the green valley of the Dallol Bosso, here seen in the dry season. The paths leaving the village slope gently downward to the forest. This slope is a major geological fault line.

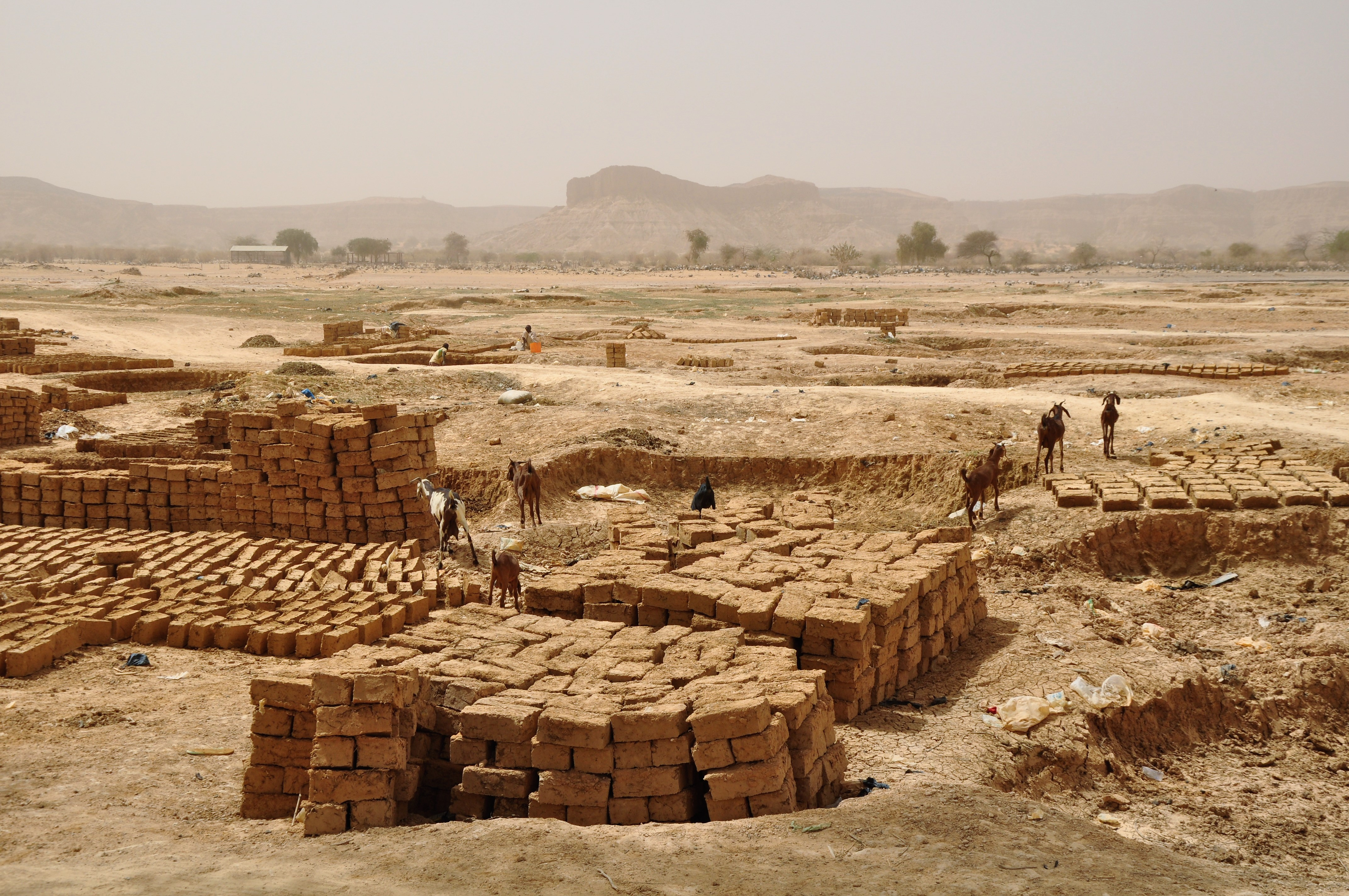
Bricks in the Dallol Bosso. After the rainy season several muddy pools remain in the valley; this mud is used for making traditional bricks, as seen here on the outskirts of the town of Filingué. In the distance the Filingué escarpment, a geological fault line on the western side of the Dallol.

The Dallol Bosso (Zarma: Boboye) is one of two major seasonal river valleys in southwest Niger. The Dallol Bosso valley runs from the Azawagh area in the Sahara west and south through the Dosso Region where it reaches the Niger River valley.

== Human habitation ==
Dallol is the Djerma language equivalent of the Arabic Wadi or the Hausa Kori: an ancient river valley which carries surface water in the rainy season, but maintains subsurface water at other times, making it a magnet for human habitation. It has historically been a center of the Djerma people of Niger. Its sections are known by a number of local names, including Dallol Boboy near its mouth and Dallol Azawak in its northern sections.

== Course ==
The valley spreads out as the Azawagh depression on the western shadow of the Aïr Mountains, contracting and feeding a handful of valleys which once carried ancient tributaries of the Niger. Dallol Bosso runs some 300 kilometres (190 mi), ranging between 5–15 kilometres (3.1–9.3 mi) across. Its western escarpment runs along a geological fault near where it reaches the Niger.
