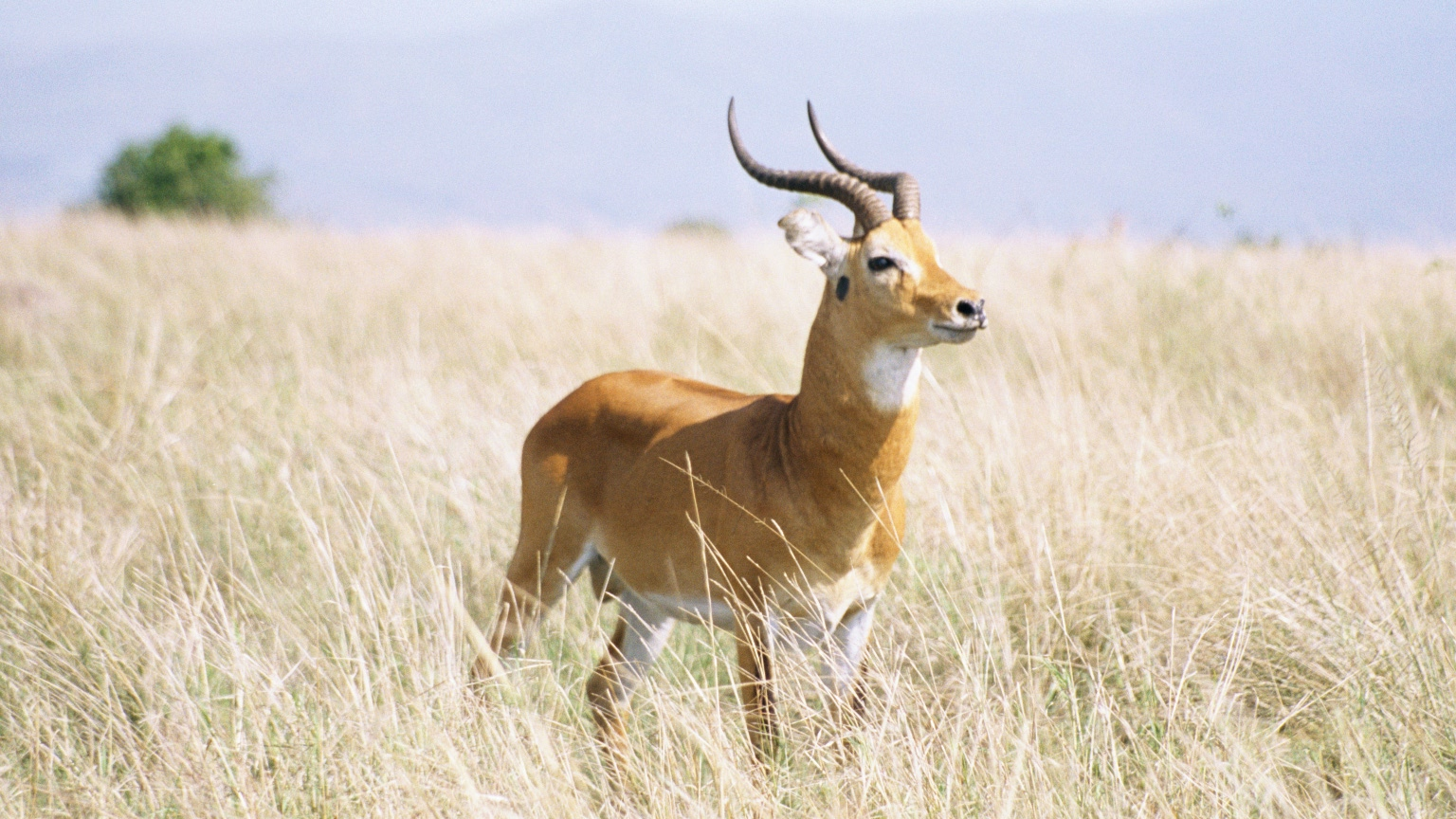
- Kob

Scientific classification
- Kingdom: Animalia
- Phylum: Chordata
- Class: Mammalia
- Order: Artiodactyla
- Family: Bovidae
- Subfamily: Reduncinae; Knottnerus-Meyer, 1907

Genera
- Kobus; Redunca; Pelea

= Reduncinae =

Reduncinae Temporal range: Late Miocene to Present

Subfamily of mammals

The bovid subfamily Reduncinae or tribe Reduncini is composed of nine species of antelope, all of which dwell in marshes, floodplains, or other well-watered areas, including the waterbucks and reedbucks. These antelopes first appear in the fossil record 7.4 million years ago in Eurasia and 6.6 Mya in Africa.

== Taxonomy ==
- Family Bovidae
  - Subfamily Reduncinae
    - Genus Kobus
      - Waterbuck, Kobus ellipsiprymnus
      - Kob, Kobus kob
      - Lechwe, Kobus leche
      - Nile lechwe, Kobus megaceros
      - Puku, Kobus vardonii
    - Genus Redunca
      - Southern reedbuck, Redunca arundinum
      - Mountain reedbuck, Redunca fulvorufula
      - Bohor reedbuck, Redunca redunca
    - Genus Pelea
      - Grey rhebok, Pelea capreolus
    - Genus †Menelikia
      - Menelikia leakeyi
      - Menelikia lyrocera
    - Genus †Procobus
      - Procobus brauneri
      - Procobus melania
    - Genus †Sivacobus (Late Pliocene to Late Pleistocene of the Indian subcontinent)
      - Sivacobus palaeindicus
      - Sivacobus patulicornis
      - Sivacobus sankaliai (Late Pleistocene)
    - Genus †Thaleroceros
      - Thaleroceros radiciformis
    - Genus †Zephyreduncinus
      - Zephyreduncinus oundagaisus

== Alternate classification ==
- Adenota is an alternate genus or subgenus composed of the kob and puku.
