= Pian Upe Wildlife Reserve =

Protected area in Uganda

- IUCN category IV (habitat/species management area)
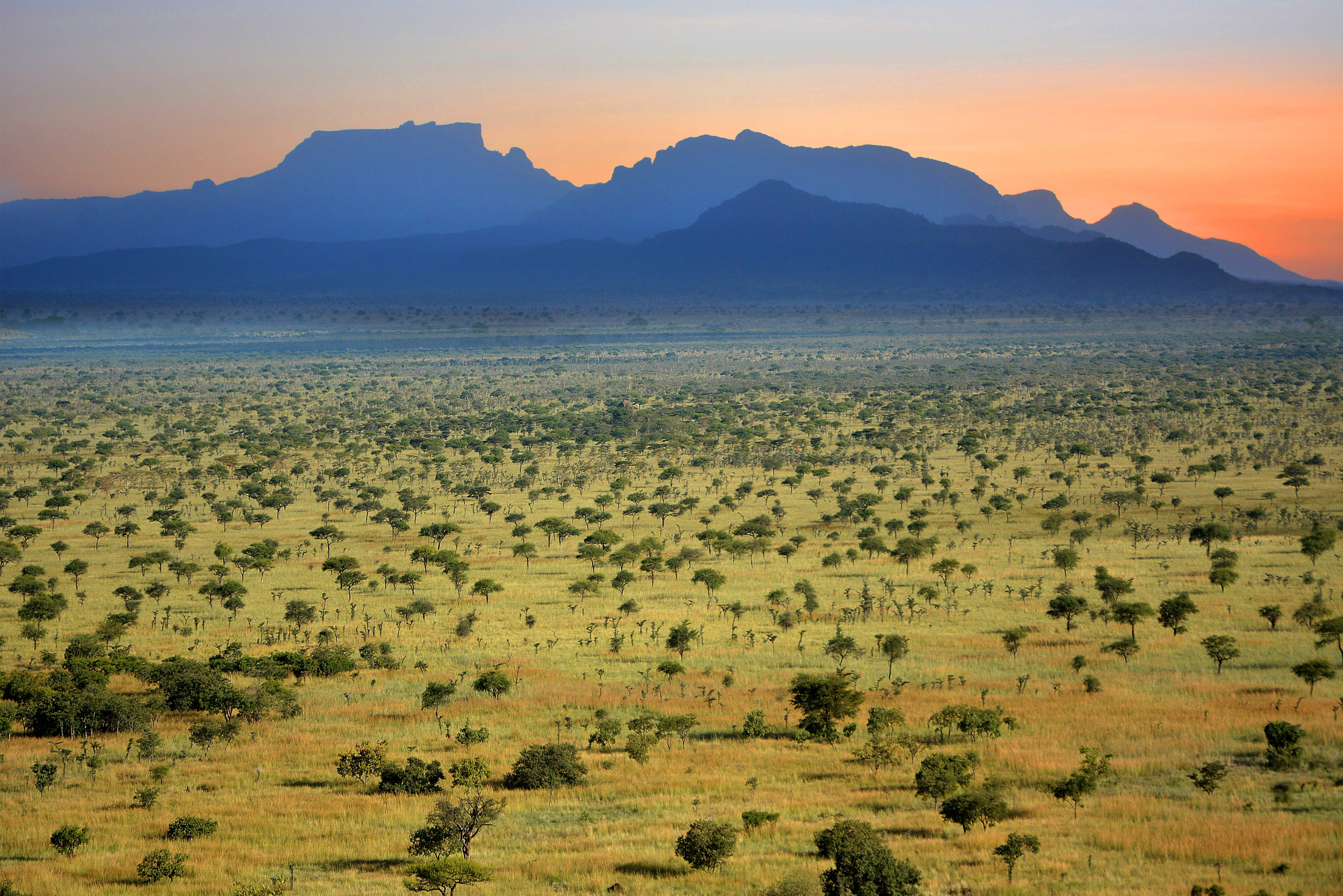

- Location within Uganda
- Location: Moroto DistrictUganda
- Nearest city: Mbale
- Coordinates: 1°51′N 34°17′E
- Area: 2,275 square kilometres (878 sq mi)
- Governing body: Uganda Wildlife Authority

The Pian Upe Wildlife Reserve is a conservation area in the Karamoja subregion of northeastern Uganda. It is the second largest conservation protected area in Uganda.

== History ==
The south of the reserve was designated as Debasien Animal Sanctuary in 1958. A government-led project to convert land just south of the Girik River for agriculture threatened the viability of wildlife conservation in the whole area. In 1964 the area was expanded northward and renamed Pian-Upe Game Reserve.

A 2003 proposal to degazette the reserve in order to farm fruit on the land was blocked.

== Geology ==
There is a hot spring potential for Geothermal tapping at Cheposukunya. Further to that, there are Mercury wells at Mt. Kadam.

The reserve features semi arid climate with one rain season annually.

== Biology ==
=== Plants ===
Most of the reserve is covered by undisturbed grassland and wooded grassland. Small areas of riverine woodland, kopjes also exist. Some land is cultivated, and especially the area near the Greek River is threatened by conversion.

Dominant tree species are red acacia and desert date. Also present are bushwillows, Harrisonia abyssinica and Gymnosporia senegalensis. Shrubs include butterfly pea and woolly caper bush. Cultivated areas have many live fences of yellow oleander.

Common grasses in the grassland are thatching grass and Setaria species. Less common are beard grasses and lemon grasses. Along the rivers Setaria incrassata and red nut sedge dominate. The lower vegetation layer burns every year.

=== Large mammals ===
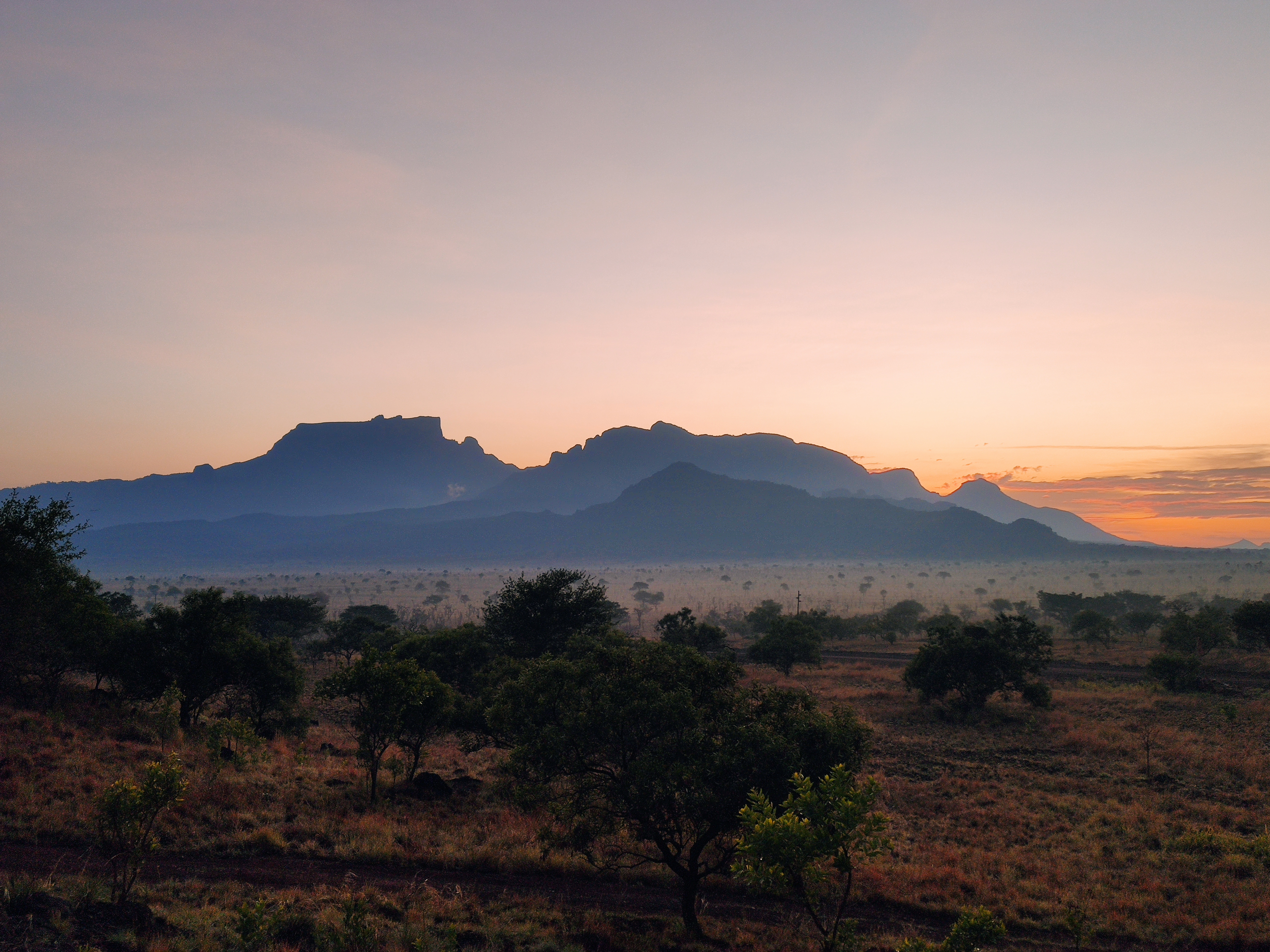
Photo of Mount Kadam Sunrise captutred from Pian Upe Wildlife Reserve

Although the area once supported healthy populations of lions, elephants, black rhinos and giraffes, these are now locally extinct. The last giraffe was reportedly poached in 1995. In October 2019 15 giraffes from Murchison Falls National Park where reintroduced in the reserve by UWA. Populations of plains zebra, common eland, are also threatened Grants gazelle.

The most commonly sighted mammal in the reserve is the oribi. Others known to inhabit the area (as of 1996) include:

- Carnivores

- Jackals
- Civets
- Spotted hyenas
- Servals
- Leopards
- Cheetah
- Wildcats

- Primates

- Vervet monkeys
- Patas monkeys
- Olive baboons

- Ungulates

- Topi
- Cape buffalo
- Common eland
- Roan antelope
- Blue and common duiker
- Günther's dik-dik
- Klipspringer
- Waterbuck
- Ugandan kob
- Bohor and mountain reebuck
- Giraffe
- Impala

- Rock hyrax
- Aardvark
- Crested porcupine
- Hare
- Four-toed hedgehog

=== Reptiles ===
Pian Upe is home to enormous rock pythons and smaller but venomous puff adders. Harmless water snakes are also found there.
The largest lizards in Pian Upe are the Savannah monitors. Others in the reserve include the common agama as well as skinks, chameleons and geckos.
