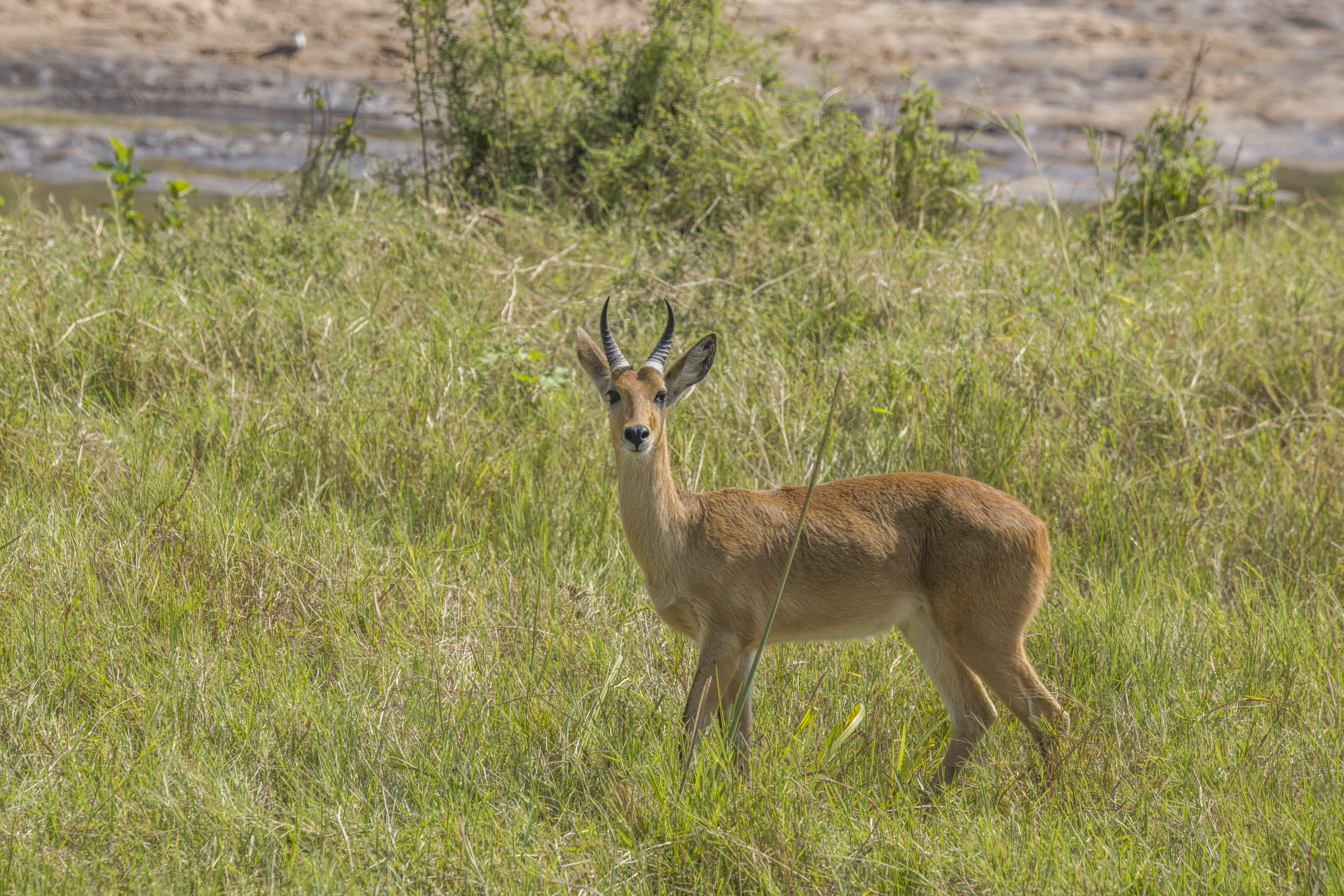
- male Bohor reedbuck
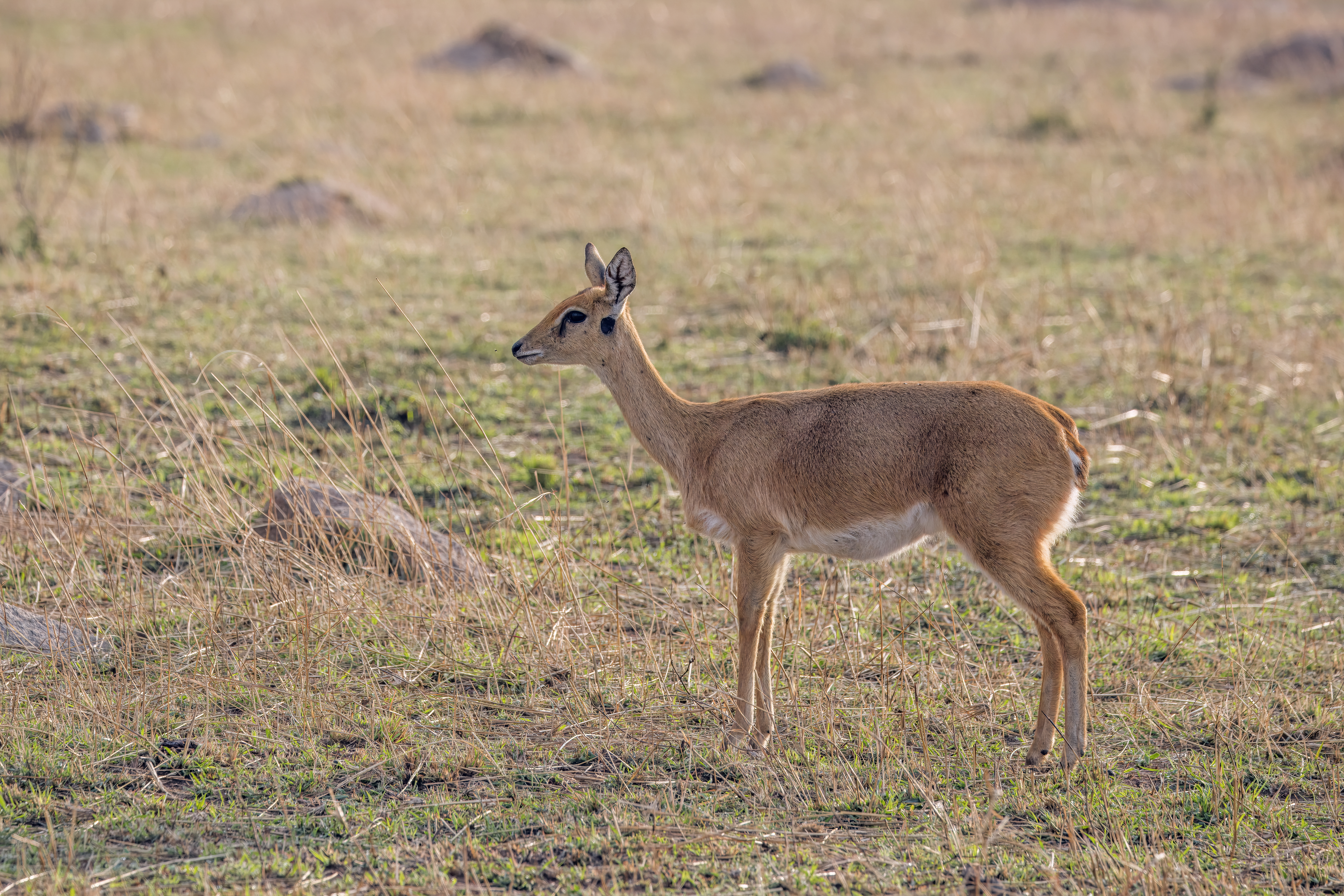
- female Bohor reedbuck both R. r. wardi Serengeti National Park, Tanzania

Scientific classification
- Kingdom: Animalia
- Phylum: Chordata
- Class: Mammalia
- Order: Artiodactyla
- Family: Bovidae
- Subfamily: Reduncinae
- Genus: Redunca; Hamilton Smith, 1827

Type species
- Antilope redunca Pallas, 1767

Species
- Redunca arundinum; Redunca fulvorufula; Redunca redunca

= Reedbuck =

Bohor reedbuck

Genus of mammals

Reedbuck is a common name for African antelopes from the genus Redunca.
Bohor reedbucks belong to the family Bovidae and subfamily Reduncinae. Bohor reedbucks are known to be savannah grazers that live near water sources. They have been found in areas like the Bale Mountains National Park in Ethiopia. Southern reedbucks are found near elevated land, including places in South Africa like Natal.

The reedbuck is distinguished by a round glandular spot below each ear, with males having forward-curving horns that vary in size and shape among species. There are three recognised species of reedbuck: the southern reedbuck is the largest, while the mountain reedbuck is the smallest.

== Nhlangwini Natives of South Africa ==
The name of the Nation/language is derived from a word meaning reedbuck (cf. INhlangu in Zulu, iNtlangu in Xhosa). The chief Nombewu, a father of a prominent chief, inkosi uFodo of Nhlangwini clan was a brave hunter with his son Fodo. The skin of inhlangu cannot be pierced by a spear. What the hunters would do when trying to kill the animal, was to aim at the position of the heart, and then press the spear so hard that the heart was interfered with without the spear penetrating through the skin. That is why Fodo, the chief of the Nhlangwini nation was praised as: Umkhonto kawungeni ungena ngokucindetela. ("Spear that does not penetrate, it only penetrates on pressing hard".)

Fodo used to present Dingane, the king of the Zulus after Shaka, with the hides of this animal. He, together with his people, were thus generally known as abantu benhlangu (people of the inhlangu animal, hence abaseNhlangwini.

Image	Scientific name	Common name	Distribution
	Redunca arundinum	Southern reedbuck	Gabon and Tanzania to South Africa
	Redunca fulvorufula	Mountain reedbuck	sub-Saharan Africa.
	Redunca redunca	Bohor reedbuck	Benin, Burkina Faso, Burundi, Cameroon, Central African Republic, Chad, Democratic Republic of Congo, Ethiopia, Gambia, Ghana, Guinea, Guinea-Bissau, Kenya, Mali, Mauritania, Niger, Nigeria, Rwanda, Senegal, Sudan, Tanzania, Togo and Uganda.
