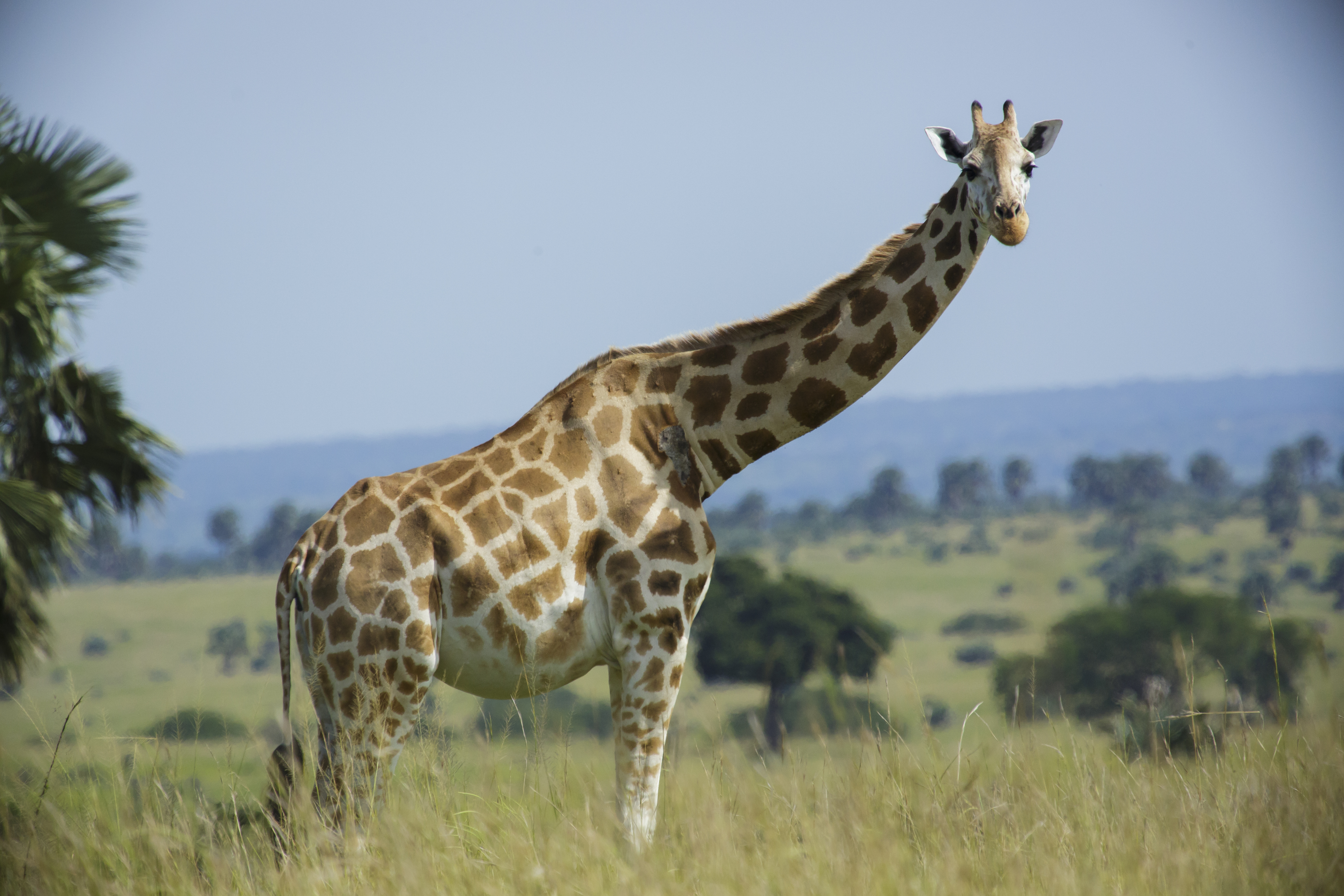
- In Murchison Falls National Park
- Sound (hum)

Conservation status
- Vulnerable (IUCN 3.1)
- CITES Appendix II

Scientific classification
- Kingdom: Animalia
- Phylum: Chordata
- Class: Mammalia
- Infraclass: Placentalia
- Order: Artiodactyla
- Family: Giraffidae
- Genus: Giraffa
- Species: G. camelopardalis

Binomial name
- Giraffa camelopardalis Linnaeus, 1758

= Northern giraffe =

Proposed species of giraffe

The northern giraffe (Giraffa camelopardalis), also known as the three-horned giraffe, is a species of giraffe native to North Africa.

Once abundant throughout Africa since the 19th century, the Northern Giraffe ranged from Senegal, Mali and Nigeria from West Africa to up north in Egypt. The similar West African giraffe lived in Algeria and Morocco in ancient periods until their extinctions due to the Saharan dry climate.

Giraffes collectively are listed as vulnerable on the IUCN Red List, as the global population is thought to consist of about 97,000 individuals as of 2016.

== Taxonomy and evolution ==
As of August 2025, the IUCN Giraffe and Okapi Specialist Group recognizes four distinct species of giraffe: the northern giraffe, the Masai giraffe, the reticulated giraffe, and the southern giraffe.

A 2021 whole genome sequencing study suggested the northern giraffe as a separate species, and postulates the existence of three distinct subspecies, and more recently, one extinct subspecies. This supports the 2025 IUCN reports.

There are three recognized subspecies of northern giraffe: the Kordofan giraffe, the Nubian giraffe, and the West African giraffe.

Image	Subspecies	Description	Distribution
	Kordofan giraffe (G. c. antiquorum)	Its spots may be found below the hocks and the insides of the legs. A median lump is present in males.	Southern Chad, the Central African Republic, northern Cameroon, and the northeastern DR Congo.
	Nubian giraffe (G. c. camelopardalis)	It has sharply defined chestnut-coloured spots surrounded by mostly white lines, while undersides lack spotting. Includes the Rothschild's giraffe ecotype	Eastern South Sudan and southwestern Ethiopia, in addition to Kenya and Uganda.
	West African giraffe (G. c. peralta)	This animal has a lighter pelage than other subspecies, with red lobe-shaped blotches that reach below the hocks.	Southwestern Niger
	Senegalese giraffe (G. c. senegalensis)	It had dark brown patches, with a clear contour. Body was almost uniform in size.	Extinct; formerly parts of Senegal, The Gambia, Mali, and Mauritania up until the 1970s.

== Description ==
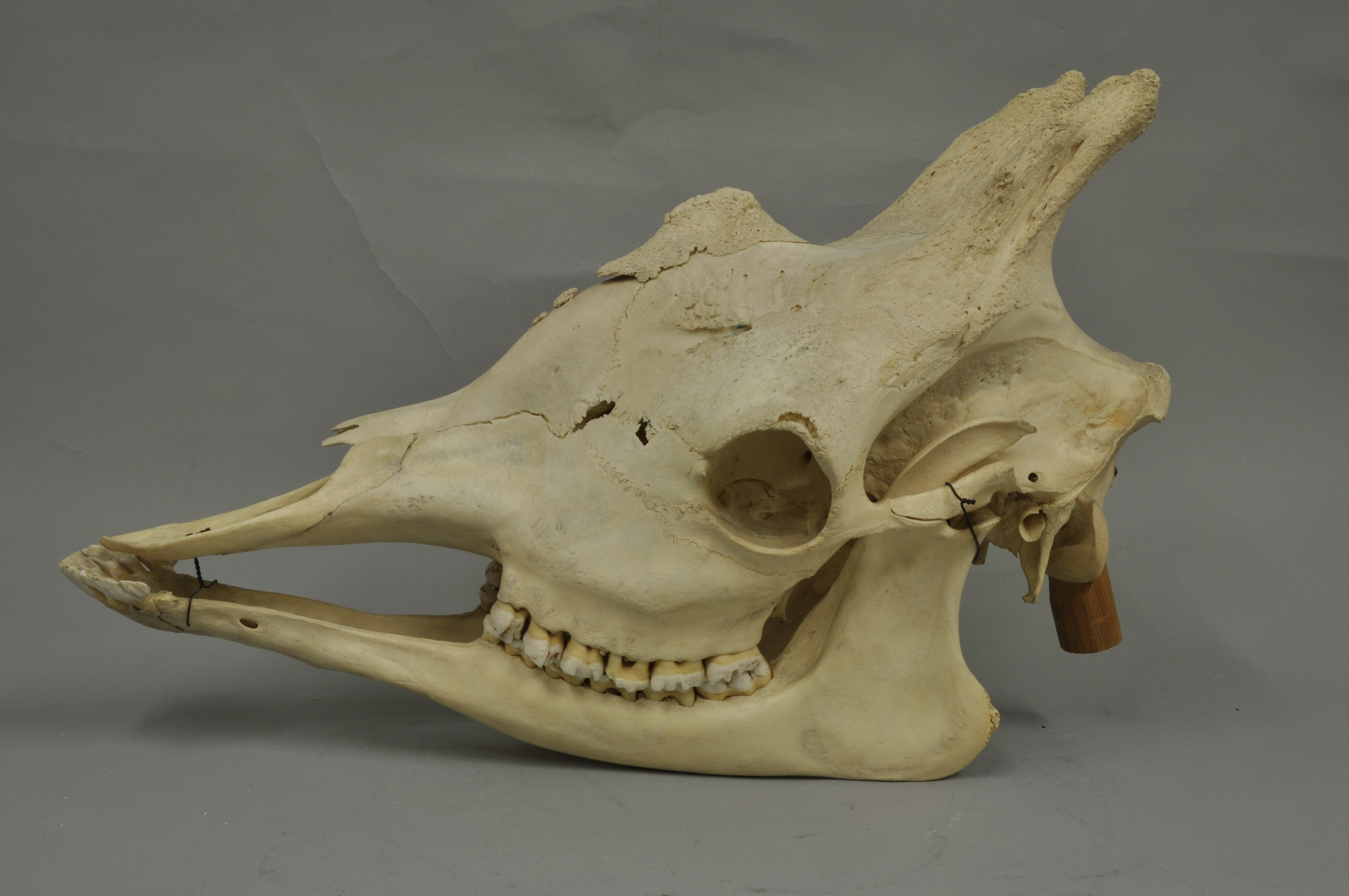
Skull of a northern giraffe

Three-dimensional model of a northern giraffe skeleton

Often mistaken with the southern giraffe, the northern giraffe differs by the shape and size of the two distinctive horn-like protuberances known as ossicones on its forehead; they are longer and larger than those of southern giraffe. Male northern giraffes have a third cylindrical ossicone in the center of the head just above the eyes, ranging from 76 to 127 mm (3 to 5 in) long.

== Distribution and habitat ==
Northern giraffes live in savannahs, shrublands, and woodlands. After numerous local extinctions, northern giraffes are the least numerous giraffe species, and the most endangered. In East Africa, Nubian giraffes are mostly found in Kenya, Uganda and southwestern Ethiopia, and South Sudan. in Uganda the Uganda Wildlife Authority aided by the Giraffe Conservation Foundation, have moved Nubian giraffes to Kidepo National Park to reinforce and secure the population there, reintroduced Nubian giraffes to Pian Upe Wildlife Reserve, moved them to the south side of the Nile in Murchison Falls National Park, and introduced them to Lake Mburo National Park. In Central Africa, there are almost 2,400 Kordofan giraffes in the Central African Republic, Chad, Cameroon and a small but growing population in Garamba National Park in northeastern Democratic Republic of the Congo. Once widespread in West Africa, just one population of a few hundred West African giraffes was confined to the Dosso Reserve of Kouré and surrounding area known as the Giraffe Zone in Niger, in 2018, eight giraffes were reintroduced to the Gadabedji Reserve in central Niger, by the Giraffe Conservation Foundation and Sahara Conservation Fund, a further four were moved in 2022, a dangerous undertaking, given the dire security situation in the Kouré Region, this has created a second population of West African giraffes. They are isolated in South Sudan, Kenya, Chad and Niger. They commonly live both in and outside of protected areas.

The earliest ranges of the Northern giraffes were in Chad during the late Pliocene. Once abundant in North Africa, they lived in Algeria from the early Pleistocene during the Quaternary period. They lived in Morocco, Libya and Egypt until their extinction there around AD 600, as the drying climate of the Sahara made conditions impossible for giraffes. Giraffe bones and fossils have been found across these countries.
