= Senegalese giraffe =

Conservation status
- Extinct

Scientific classification
- Kingdom: Animalia
- Phylum: Chordata
- Class: Mammalia
- Order: Artiodactyla
- Family: Giraffidae
- Genus: Giraffa
- Species: G. camelopardalis
- Subspecies: G. c. senegalensis

Trinomial name
- Giraffa camelopardalis senegalensis Petzold, Magnant, & Hassanin, 2020

Extinct subspecies of giraffe

The Senegalese giraffe (Giraffa camelopardalis senegalensis), or just the Senegal giraffe, is a partially disputed, extinct subspecies of the West African giraffe that was native to parts of Senegal and surrounding areas up until the 1970s.

== Taxonomy ==
Giraffa camelopardalis senegalensis is sometimes listed as a population of the West African giraffe, though genetics, body structure, and general colorations are very irregular on the Senegalese giraffe compared to the West African giraffe, making the subspecies into a taxon with a disputed ranking. It was described from a holotypic specimen hunted near Bakel, Senegal.

== Description ==
The Senegalese giraffe had large, dark brown spots and patches, with a clear contour and an almost uniform in size body structure. These factors differentiated it from the West African giraffe's paler coat with a lighter brown color for its spots. One factor that was similar to Giraffa camelopardalis peralta was that it also had no spots on its legs, being a trait in the subspecies.

== Distribution and habitat ==
The Senegalese giraffe was native to the country of Senegal, and surrounding areas with the West African giraffe. The West African giraffe was also eradicated from Senegal, being native to some sections of southeastern Niger. This fact originally led zoologists to believe that the Senegalese giraffe was a distinctly different population of Giraffa camelopardalis peralta, although the different coat colors and body structures said otherwise. It may have been native as far east as Mali, and as far north as Mauritania, with populations definite within The Gambia.

== Extinction ==
Giraffa camelopardalis senegalensis was declared extinct sometime in the 1970s due to poaching, big game hunting, habitat destruction, drought, and rinderpest outbreaks. The last of the subspecies individuals were wiped out due to overhunting, and illegal poaching activities.
