= Adenota =

Alternative genus or sub-genus of mammals

Adenota is an alternative genus or sub-genus within the Reduncinae sub-family of family Bovidae, composed of the species Kobus kob (Kob) and Kobus vardonii (Puku). It was described by Gray in 1847.
