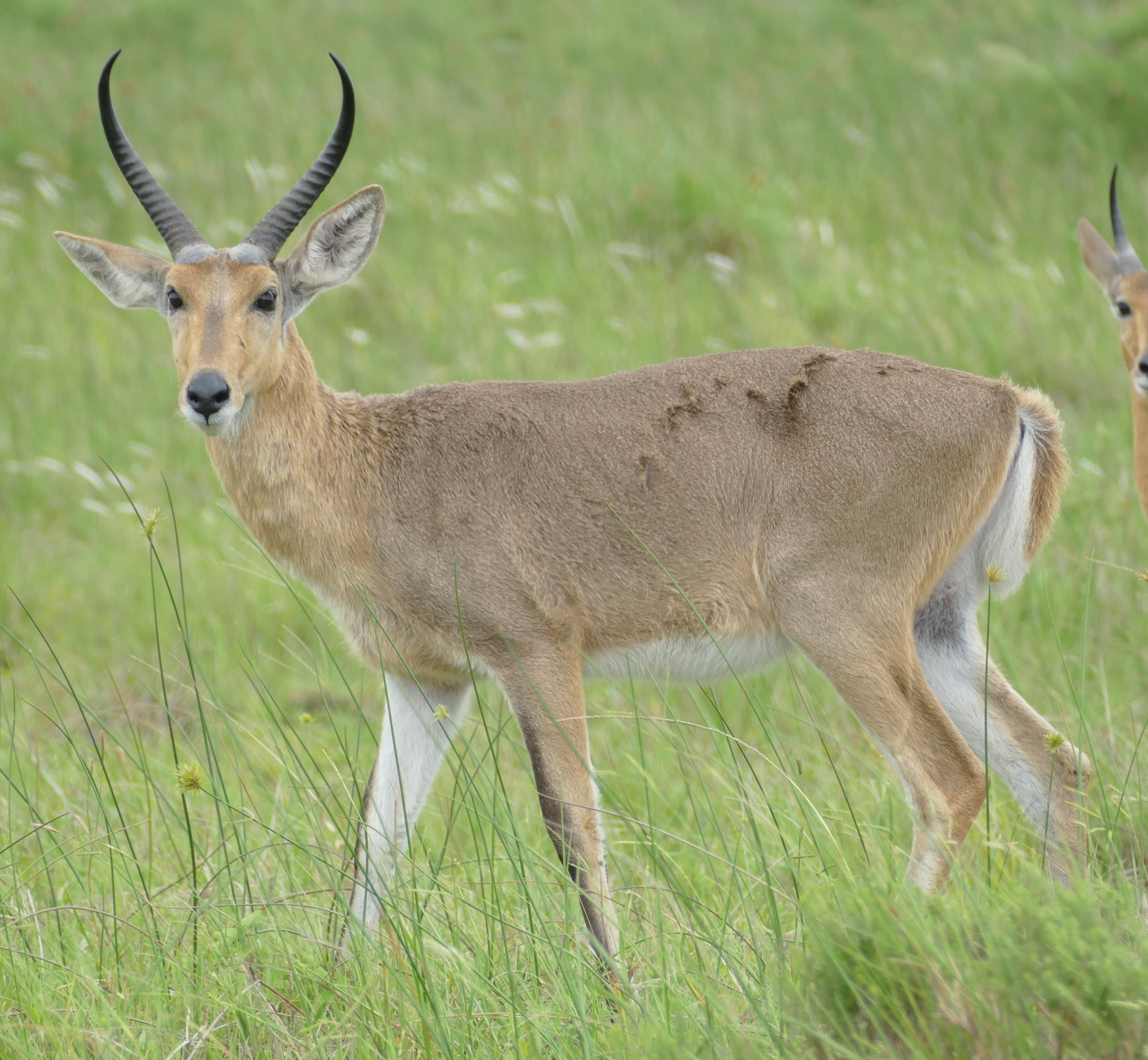
- Male at the iSimangaliso Wetland Park, KwaZulu-Natal(South Africa)
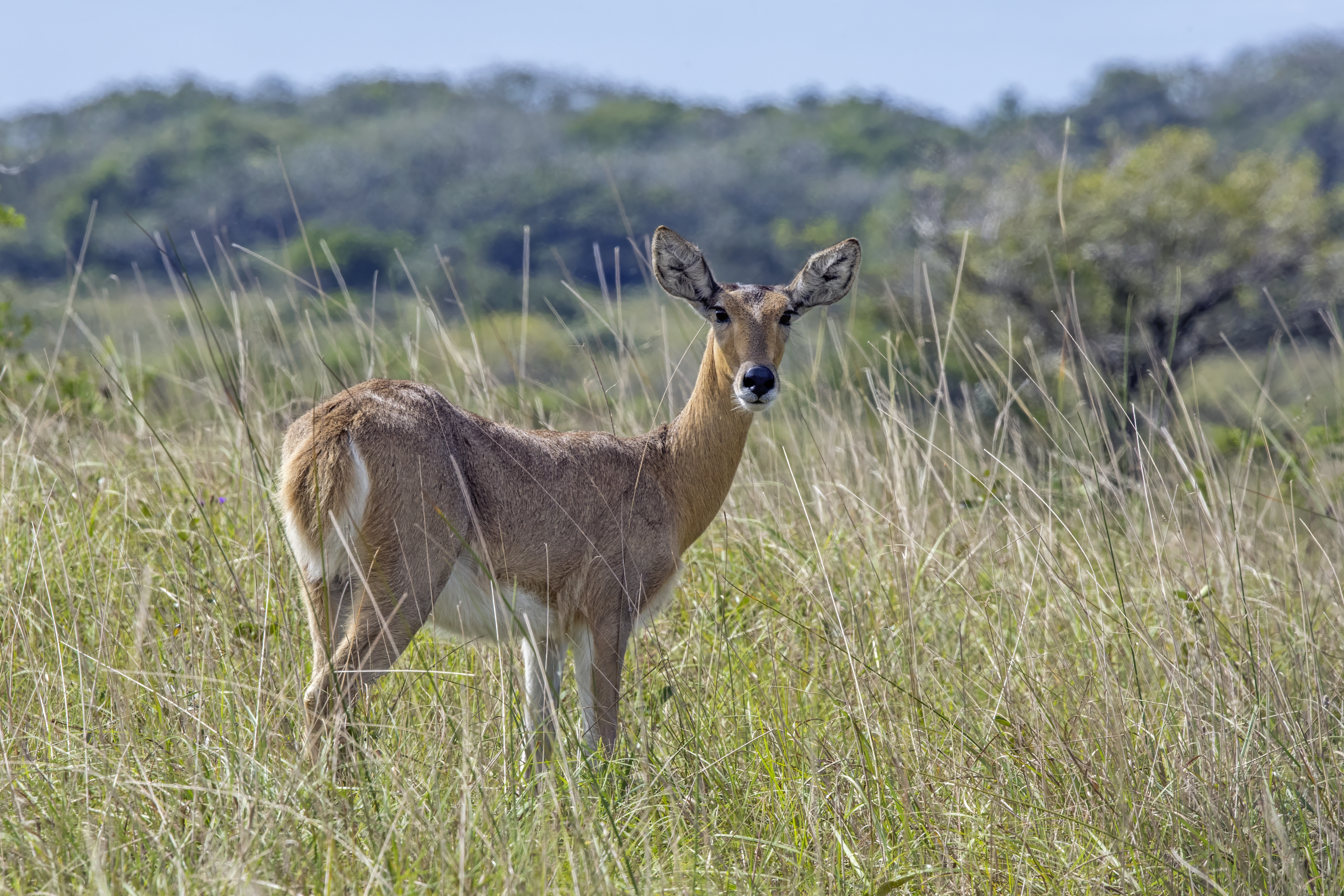
- Female at the Maputo National Park, Mozambique

Conservation status
- Least Concern (IUCN 3.1)

Scientific classification
- Kingdom: Animalia
- Phylum: Chordata
- Class: Mammalia
- Order: Artiodactyla
- Family: Bovidae
- Genus: Redunca
- Species: R. arundinum

Binomial name
- Redunca arundinum (Boddaert, 1785)
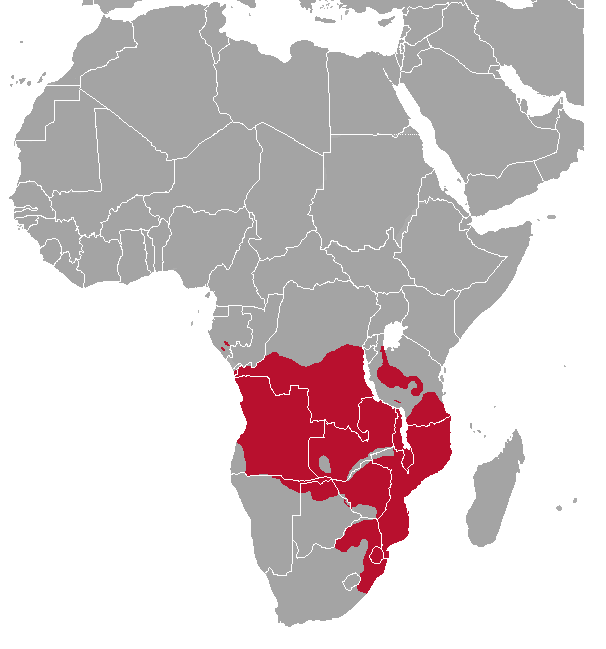
- Range

= Southern reedbuck =

Species of antelope

The southern reedbuck, rietbok or common reedbuck (Redunca arundinum) is a diurnal antelope typically found in southern Africa. It was first described by Pieter Boddaert, a Dutch physician and naturalist, in 1785. It is placed in the genus Redunca and family Bovidae. This antelope has an average mass of 58 kg (128 lb) and a body length of about 134–167 cm (53–66 in).

== Taxonomy and etymology ==
It was first described by Pieter Boddaert, a Dutch physician and naturalist, in 1785. It is placed in the genus Redunca and family Bovidae. It gets its name from two Latin words: reduncas (meaning bent backwards and curved, while the horns are bent forwards) and arundo (harundo) (meaning a reed; hence arundinum, pertaining to reeds).

== Description ==
The southern reedbuck is larger than the other species in Redunca, namely R. redunca (Bohor reedbuck) and R. fulvorufula (mountain reedbuck). It stands 80–90 cm (31–35 in) at the shoulder. Females weigh 48 kg (106 lb), while the males weigh 68 kg (150 lb). It has distinctive dark lines running down the front of each of its forelegs and lower hindlegs and whitish rings around the eyes. It has a lifespan of 10 years.

The coat is silky and almost woolly. The color of its coat ranges between light- and greyish-brown, and may be lighter on the neck and chest. A small, black, bare glandular patch can be noticed at the base of each ear. White fur covers the underparts and the areas near the lips and chin. The tail is white underside, and appears short and bushy. Southern reedbucks measure an average of 85 cm (33 in) at the shoulder. Females lack horns. Males bear forward-curving horns, about 35–45 cm (14–18 in) long, with the base having a distinct band of pale, rubbery tissue.

== Ecology ==
Southern reedbucks live in pairs or alone. Sometimes, they form herds consisting of about 20 members. They prefer to lie in grass or reed beds in the heat of the day and feed during sunrise and sunset, or sometimes even at night. Old reedbucks are permanently territorial, with territories around 35-60 hectares, and generally live with a single female, preventing contact with rival males. Females and young males perform an 'appeasement dance' for older males. During the dance, the bucks run around speedily and take considerably long jumps, with the tail curled up and scented air being released from a pocket in the groin at every bounce, making a popping sound. Within this territory, it is active all the time in summer, but it is nocturnal in the wet season. It regularly uses paths to reach good sites to rest, graze, and drink water. Average lifetime home ranges have been estimated as 123 ha for females and 74 ha for males.

Their main predators include lions, leopards, cheetahs, spotted hyenas, Cape hunting dogs and Nile crocodiles. They can camouflage themselves in the grasslands due to their coats, which are almost the same color. If startled or attacked, they stand still, then either hide or flee with an odd rocking-horse movement, and cautiously look back to ensure the danger is gone, generally. They use vocalizations like a shrill whistle through their nostrils and a clicking noise to alert others about danger.

=== Physical characteristics ===
Physical characteristics
	Male	Female
Head and body length	130-160 cm	120-140 cm
Shoulder height	80-105 cm	65-95 cm
Tail length	18-30 cm	18-30 cm
Adult weight	60-95 kg	50-85 kg

=== Feeding ===
As a herbivore, the reedbuck mainly feeds on grasses. It also eats herbs and reeds. It never enters into water, though it inhabits places with water sources. It needs to drink water every few days to several times a day during the dry season.

=== Reproduction ===
The southern reedbuck breeds almost all the time of the year, although most matings occur during the hot and wet season. Females reach sexual maturity when they are two years old, when they leave their parent's territory. Males, which reach maturity at a slightly older age, may remain with the family group until their third year. A single young is born per birth after a gestation period of seven to eight months, and remains amongst the dense and tall grass cover in which it was born for the next two months. The female does not stay with her young, but instead visits it for just 10 to 30 minutes each day to nurse it.

== Habitat and distribution ==
Southern reedbucks have a wide distribution, stretching from Gabon and Tanzania to South Africa. Their range seems to extend to the Miombo woodlands on the north. They inhabit moist grasslands with tall grass, reeds, sufficient cover, and water nearby, such as floodplains, pastures, woodlands, and valleys. They are common in seasonally flooded valleys near the Malagarasi River. They also occur in the southern savannas of Tchibanga and Ndende (in Democratic Republic of the Congo).

It is native to Angola, Botswana, the Republic of the Congo, the Democratic Republic of the Congo, Gabon, Malawi, Mozambique, Namibia, South Africa, Eswatini, Tanzania, Zambia, and Zimbabwe. It also occurs in protected areas and areas with low to moderate levels of settlement, including significant populations on private land in Zimbabwe, South Africa, and Namibia. In the Republic of Congo, it formerly occurred locally in the savannahs of southern Congo, but it is probably extinct there by now. Its presence is doubted in Lesotho. Major populations occur in areas such as Selous National Park (Tanzania), Kafue National Park (Zambia), Nyika National Park (Malawi), Gorongosa National Park (Mozambique), Okavango National Park (Botswana) and Kruger National Park and Eastern Shores (South Africa).

== Conservation and threats ==
Southern reedbucks remain widespread, but they have been eliminated from some parts of their former range (such as the Congo) by the spread of settlement which has led to habitat destruction and hunting for meat and trophies. It is reportedly one of the easiest antelopes to approach and kill. About 60% of all southern reedbucks are thought to occur in protected areas and about 13% on private lands. This combination of habitat loss and overexploitation has resulted in the species becoming rare in most of South Africa, and reduced populations to precariously low levels in west and central Africa; those in Gabon and the Democratic Republic of Congo are feared to be almost extinct.
Parasites of reedbucks include the filaria Setaria graberi.
