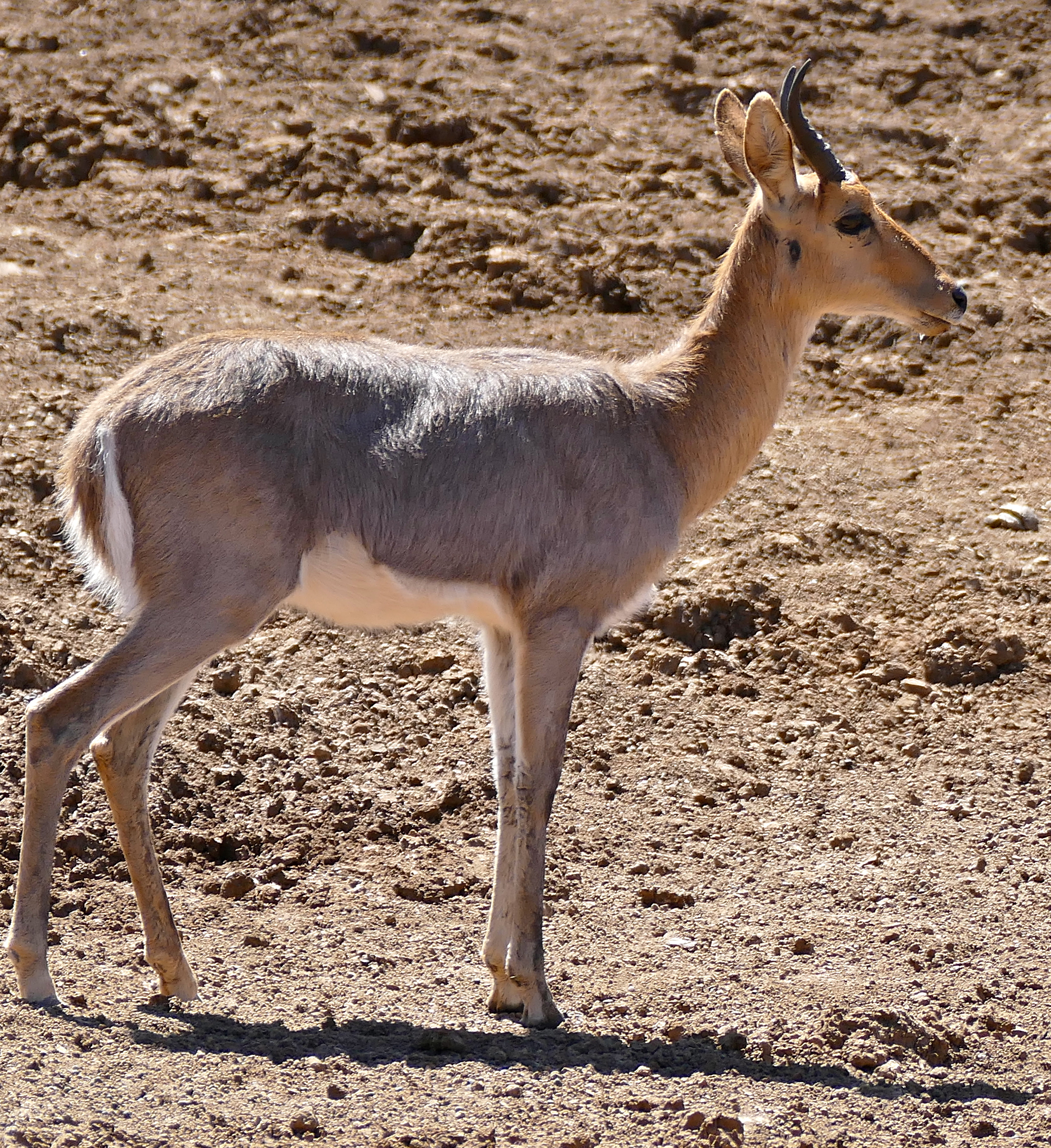
- Male at the Stofdam Hide, Mokala NP, Northern Cape (South Africa)
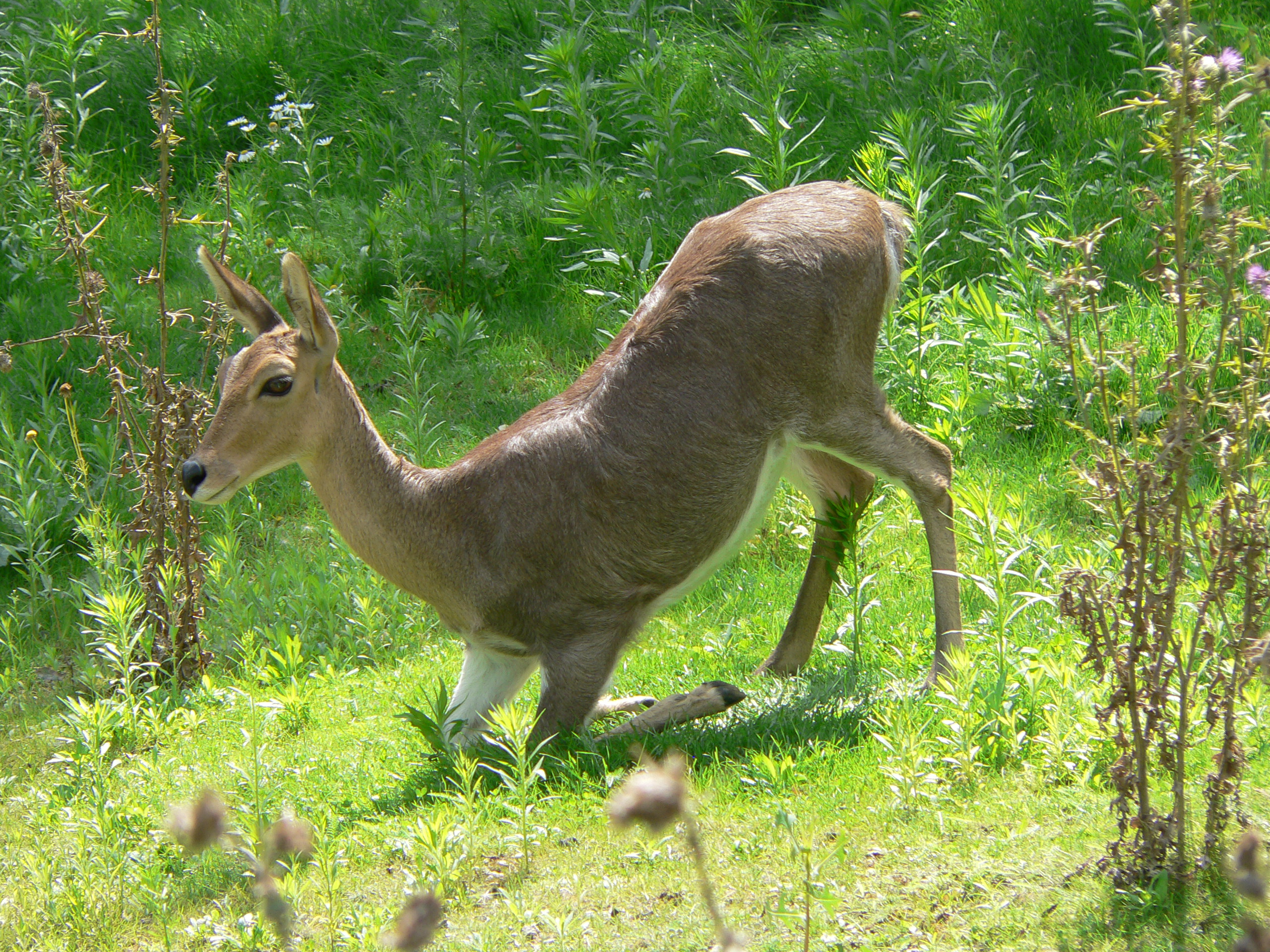
- Female at a German zoo

Conservation status
- Endangered (IUCN 3.1)

Scientific classification
- Kingdom: Animalia
- Phylum: Chordata
- Class: Mammalia
- Order: Artiodactyla
- Family: Bovidae
- Genus: Redunca
- Species: R. fulvorufula

Binomial name
- Redunca fulvorufula (Afzelius, 1815)
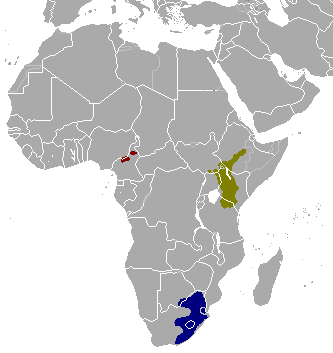
- Western mountain reedbuck Chanler's mountain reedbuck Southern mountain reedbuck

Audio
- Calls recorded in the Royal Natal N. P.

= Mountain reedbuck =

Species of mammal

The mountain reedbuck (Redunca fulvorufula) is an antelope found in mountainous areas of much of sub-Saharan Africa.

== Subspecies ==
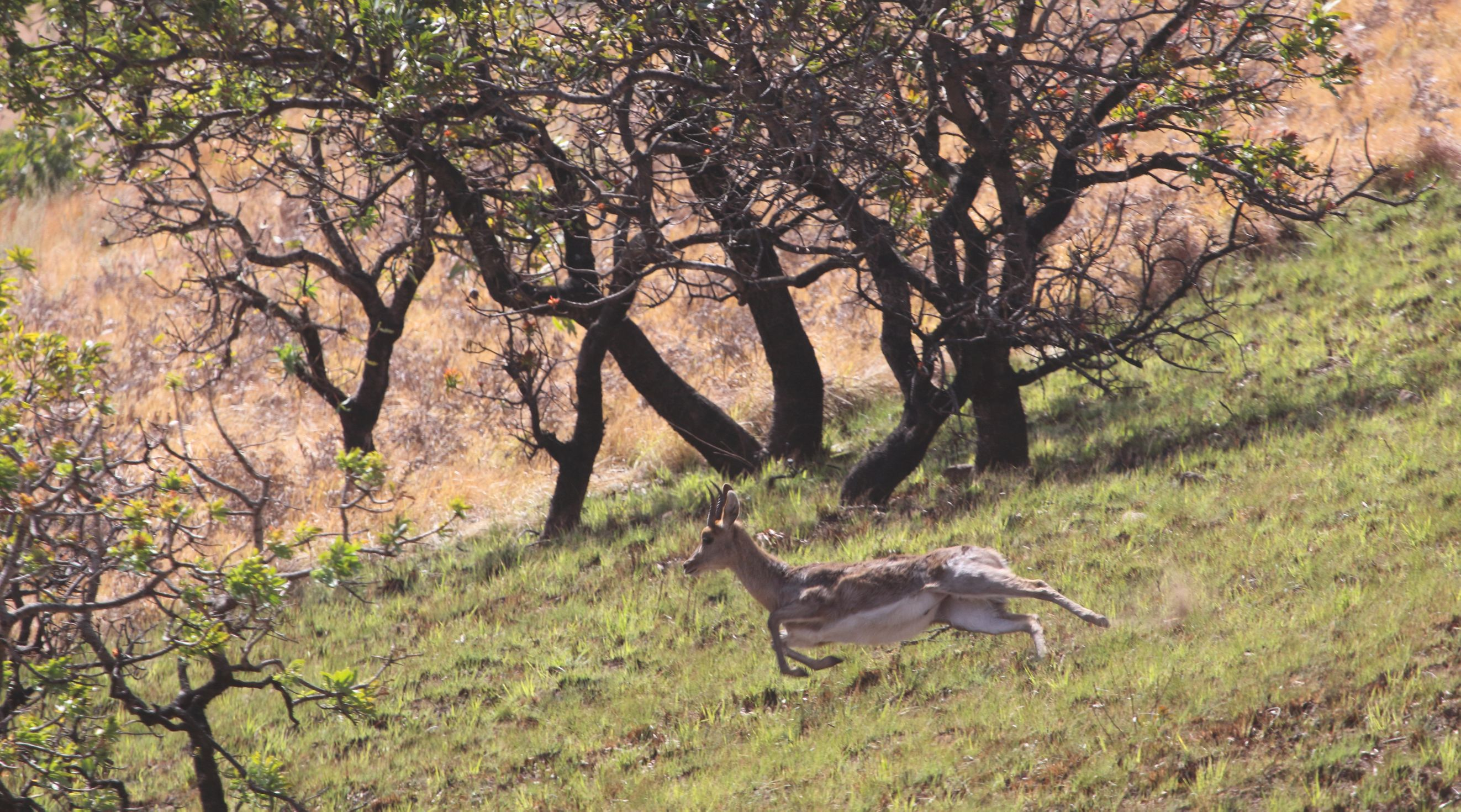
Male southern mountain reedbuck in flight, KwaZulu-Natal Drakensberg, South Africa

There are three recognized subspecies.

- Redunca fulvorufula adamauae - Adamawa mountain reedbuck
- Redunca fulvorufula chanleri - Chanler's mountain reedbuck (named for William A. Chanler)
- Redunca fulvorufula fulvorufula - southern mountain reedbuck

== Description ==
The mountain reedbuck averages 75 cm (30 in) at the shoulder, and weighs around 30 kg (66 lb). It has a grey coat with a white underbelly and reddish-brown head and shoulders. The male has ridged horns of around 15.2 cm (6.0 in), which curve forwards. Both sexes have a dark scent patch beneath the ears.

== Distribution and habitat ==
The mountain reedbuck occurs in three separate geographic areas, each containing a separate subspecies. The southern mountain reedbucks inhabits an area from the eastern Cape Province (South Africa) to southeastern Botswana. Chanler's mountain reedbuck occurs in Tanzania, Kenya, Uganda, Sudan, and Ethiopia. The Adamawa mountain reedbuck is only been found at the Nigeria-Cameroon border. The species occupies ridges and hillsides in rocky country and high-elevation grasslands (often with some tree or bush cover), at elevations of 1,500–5,000 m.

Current total population of all subspecies has been estimated at some 36,000 individuals.

== Ecology ==
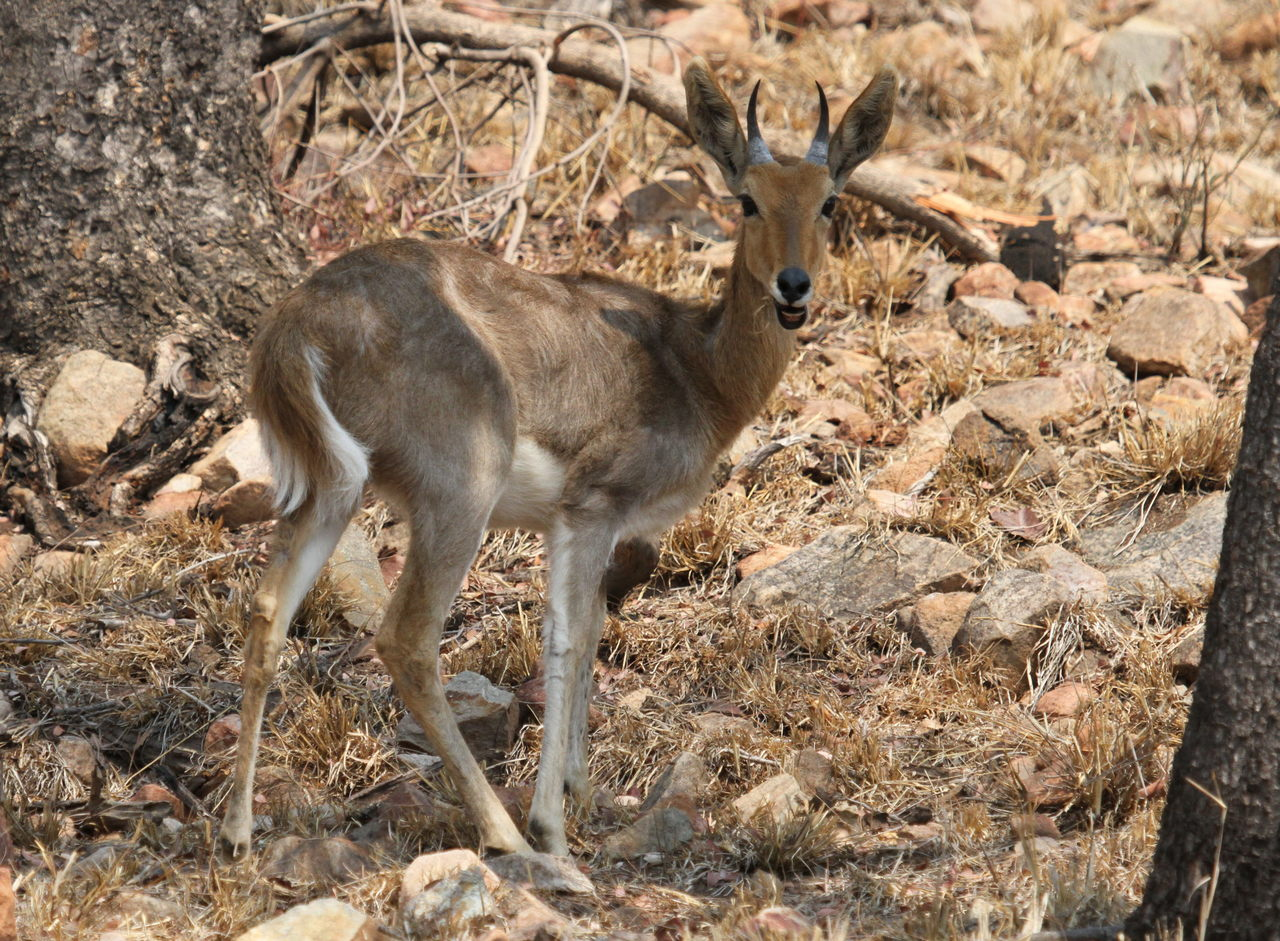
Male mountain reedbuck in Borakalalo National Park, South Africa

Mountain reedbucks are predominantly grazers, and water is an important habitat requirement. They tend to feed in the early evening and morning hours, normally in small groups of six or fewer animals. A typical group is made up of one adult male and several adult females and juveniles. Adolescent males are forced out of their herds and form small bachelor herds. Lifespan in the wild is unknown, but specimens of related species in captivity have been recorded to live up to 18 years.

The mountain reedbuck is subject to some pressure from hunting and human encroachment on its habitat, and current populations appear to be declining. This species is classified as Endangered by the IUCN.
